= Museum Kampa =

Private gallery in Prague, Czech Republic

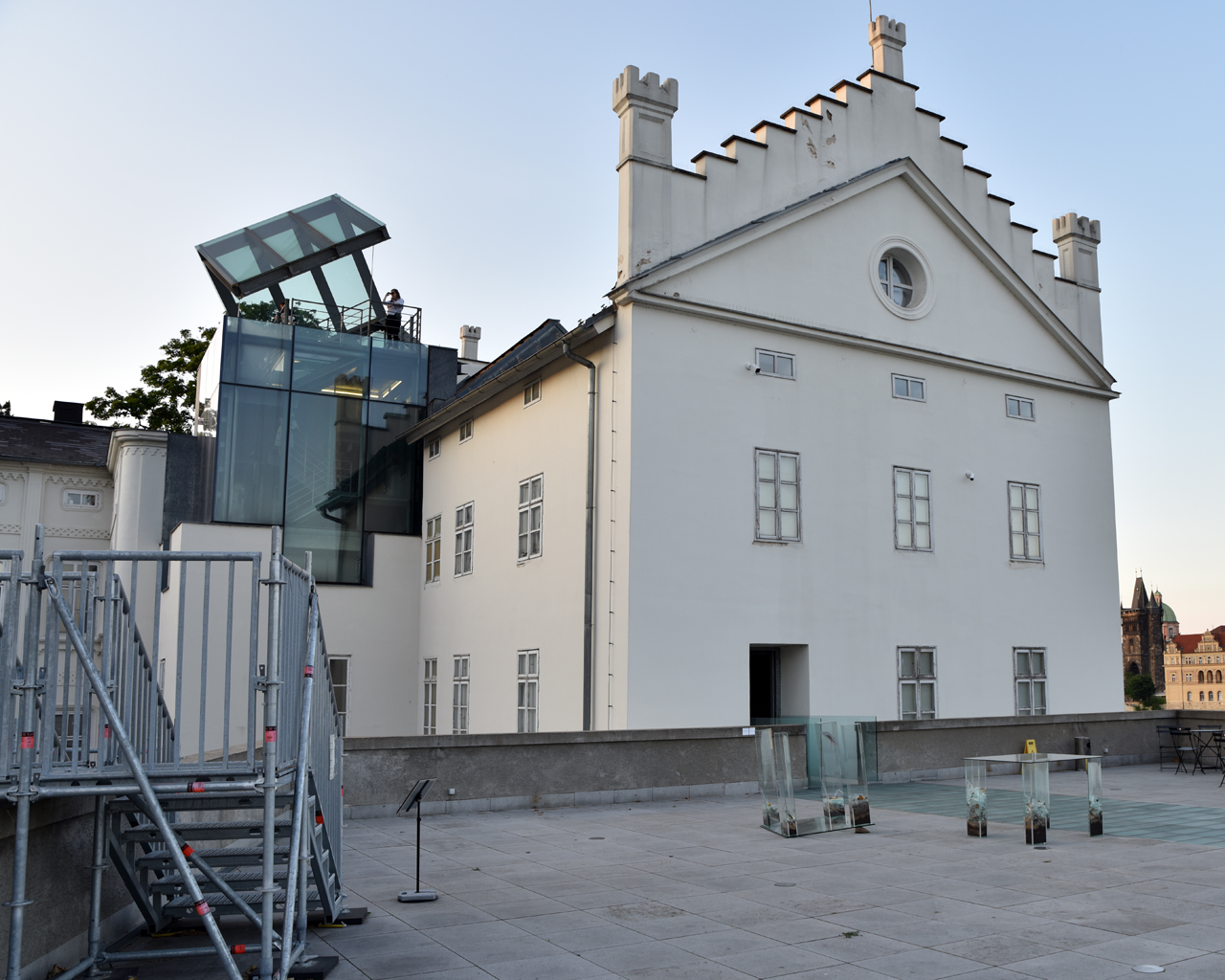
- The main building of the Kampa Museum from the terrace
- Established: 1999
- Location: U Sovových mlýnů 503/2, 118 00 Praha 1 – Malá Strana
- Key holdings: František Kupka, Otto Gutfreund
- Collections: Modern Czech art
- Founder: Meda Mládková
- Director: Jan Smetana
- Website: www.museumkampa.cz

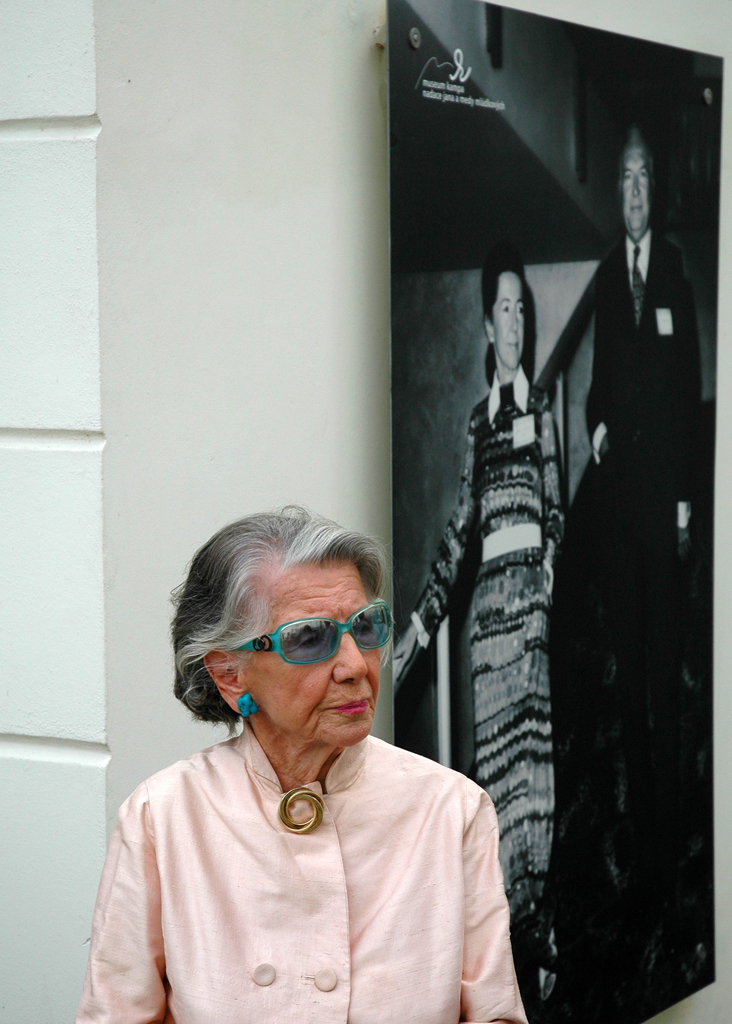
Meda Mládková, founder of museum, in 2012

Museum Kampa is a private gallery founded in Prague on February 26, 1999, by Meda Mládková as the home of the Jan and Meda Mládek Foundation collection. The museum is located in the renovated former watermills in the center of Kampa Island. Since 2022, the permanent exhibition of the Kampa Museum collections has also been hosted at the castle in Moravský Krumlov, where Alfons Mucha's Slav Epic is on display until 2026. The museum also includes a multicultural center established in Werich villa. The Věra and Vladimír Janoušek Foundation, which manages the Vladimír and Věra Janoušek Sculpture Studio in Prague's Košíře district and a depository in Vidonice, has its office here and is closely linked to the museum in terms of personnel. In 2015, the British newspaper The Guardian ranked Museum Kampa among the five most interesting private museums in Europe.

== History of the collection ==
Meda Mládková began building her collection of Czech art while living in the United States. Thanks to her personal friendship with František Kupka, she managed to assemble an extensive collection of his works. She also purchased a large collection of sculptures by Otto Gutfreund, which had been exported to the US by the socialist enterprise Art Centrum, when the original dealer in New York was unable to sell the sculptures and pay for them. During the normalization period, Meda Mládková continued purchasing of artworks by a number of Czech artists who were not allowed to exhibit at the time.

The core of the collection consists of 1,086 works of art by Czech and European artists, which were purchased over the years by Meda Mládková. In 2002, the private collection of works by Jiří Kolář and Běla Kolářová was acquired as a donation to the foundation. The collection of contemporary Czech art "In Honor of Jindřich Chalupecký" was originally created from donations by artists for the purchase of a hemodialysis machine for Jindřich Chalupecký. Thanks to the generosity of the manufacturer and the Charter 77 Foundation, which paid for the machine, the works were eventually transferred to the Kampa Museum Foundation. In 2007, Meda Mládková purchased a collection of Czech art assembled by Grit Wendelberger.

== History of the Kampa Museum buildings ==
Watermills at this address probably existed from the Middle Ages as the property of the Benedictine monastery at Prague Castle and were documented from 1393. The wooden mill was burned down by the Hussites, and in 1478 the land passed from the ownership of the Old Town of Prague to Václav Sova of Liboslav, who built a hammer mill with a gristmill here. It was destroyed by a flood in 1501 and burned down in 1560. In 1574, the watermill returned to the ownership of the Old Town municipality, which built a stone Renaissance building here in 1589, of which the remains of the tower have been preserved. In 1641, the mill burned down again and was rebuilt during the Baroque period.

A major change was the classicist reconstruction in the 19th century, when the mill was owned by miller František Odkolek. At that time, the north wing and the luxurious residential part of the mill were also built. The neo-Gothic facade, designed by architect Josef Schulz, dates from after 1867. František Odkolek also built a single-story machine room with a chimney and enclosed the courtyard with horse stables. A polygonal tower was built in the courtyard, probably above the well, which was later used as a dovecote. In 1896, the mill burned down and returned to the ownership of the Prague municipality. In the following years, there were carpentry workshops here, and the Pinkas family lived in the residential wing for a short time. On the north side, a garden with a pool and fountain adjoined the mills.

In the post-war era, the building housed the Czechoslovak Academy of Sciences, the Zdeněk Nejedlý Library, and the Department of Theater Studies. The building, owned by the City of Prague, then stood empty for several years, and by the time Meda Mládková discovered it, it had fallen into such disrepair that it was in danger of collapsing. In 1999, a lease agreement was signed and reconstruction began, carried out by Studio 8000. The neo-Gothic appearance of the facade was preserved, and new elements designed by Václav Cigler, Marian Karel, and Dana Zámečníková (a glass cube on the staircase tower, glass footbridges, a water feature in the courtyard) were integrated after winning in an architectural competition. Meda Mládková had an apartment in a small house on the south side of the courtyard, where the ticket office and shop are located. Shortly after the completion of the construction work, Museum Kampa was damaged by the disastrous floods in 2002, which flooded the building. In the following years, the former stables were adapted for exhibition purposes.

The grand opening of Museum Kampa took place on September 8, 2003.

On July 15, 2020, a fire broke out in the museum. Due to non-compliance with safety regulations during welding, the paneling in the museum's technical facilities, where the air conditioning units are located, burned down. The fire was extinguished within two hours, but smoke penetrated the upper floors of the building and the depository.

The museum building and the embankment above the Vltava River are home to the Café restaurant Musea Kampa, and there is a summer theater stage in the courtyard.

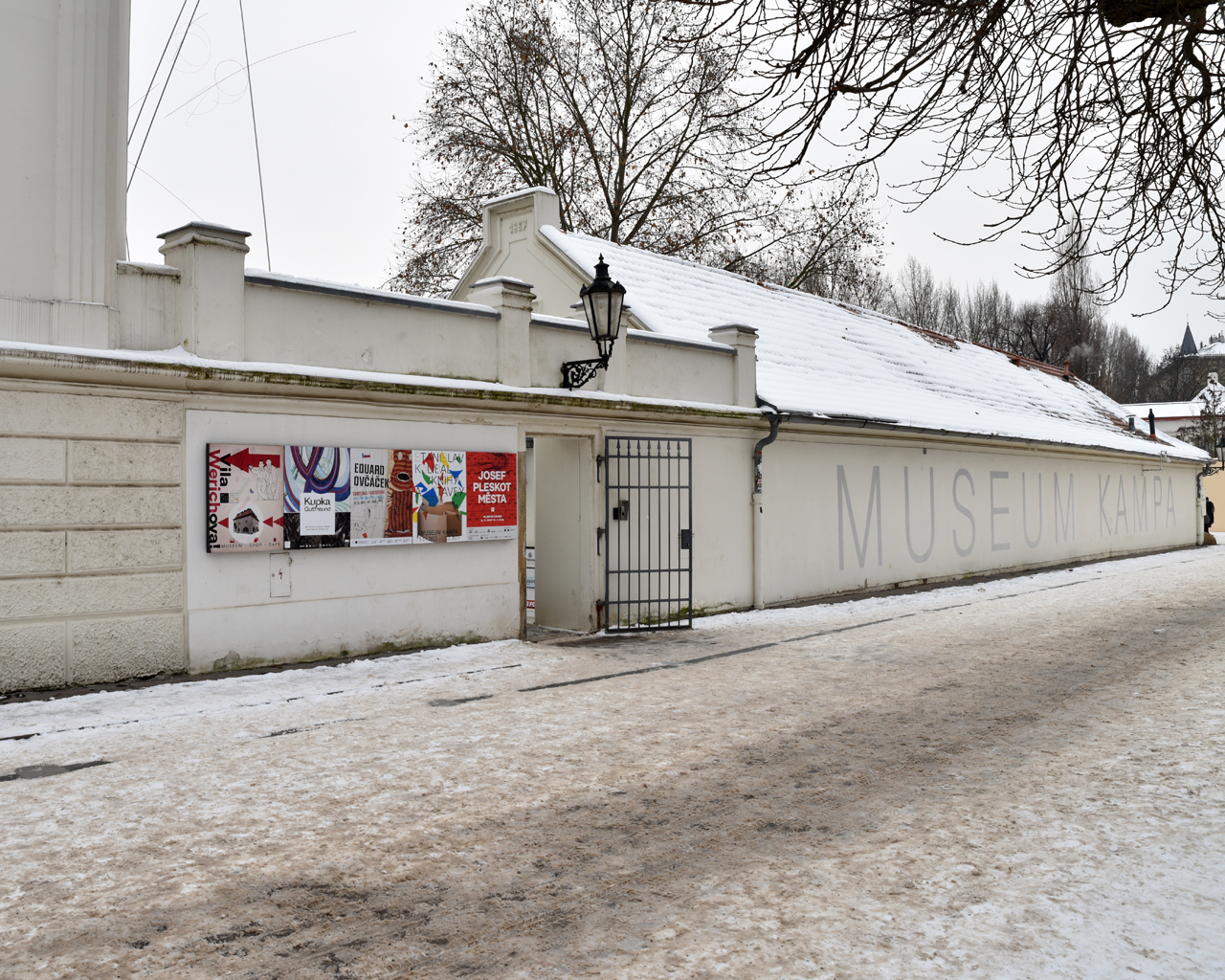
Museum Kampa, entrance to the courtyard

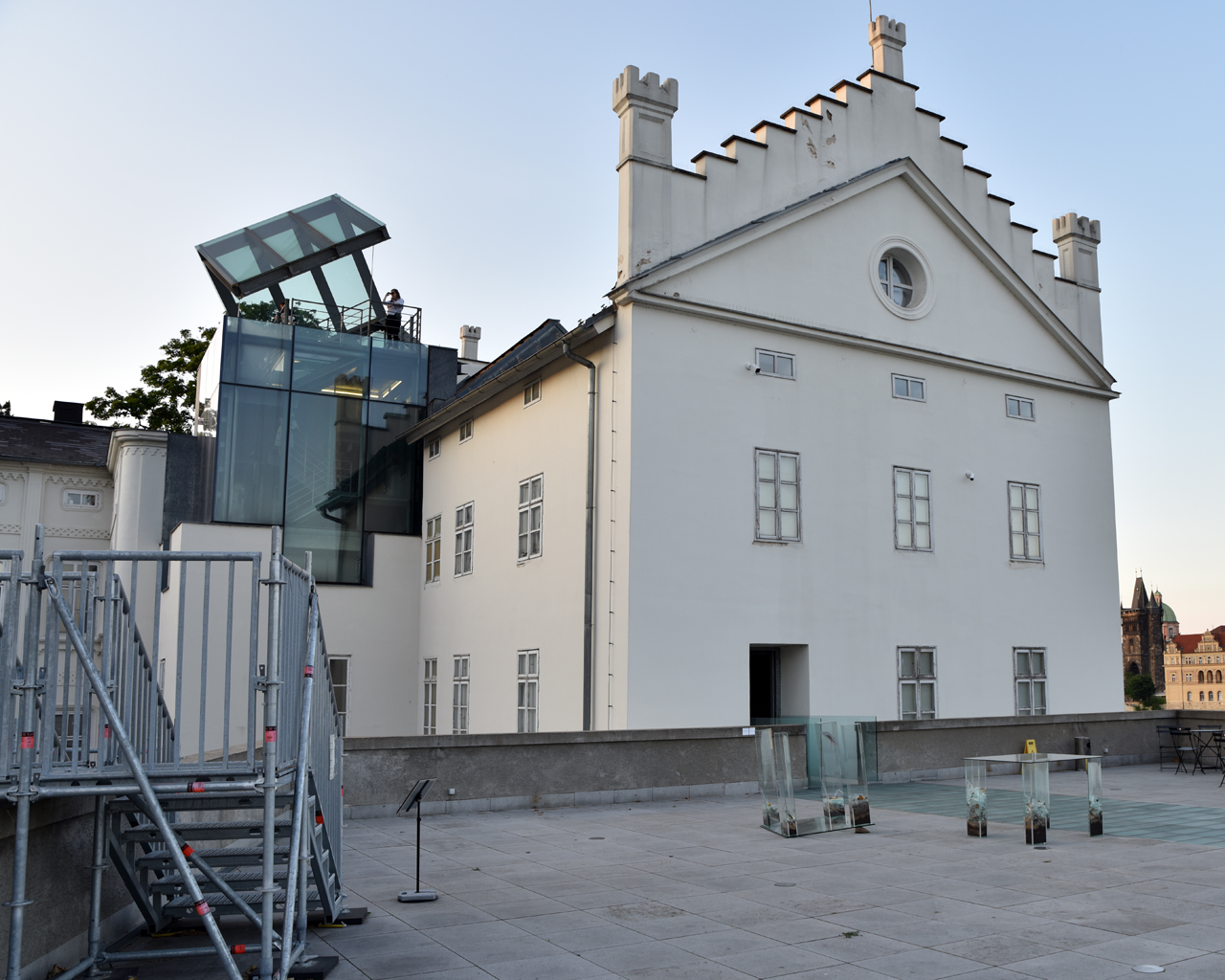
Main building of Museum Kampa from the terrace

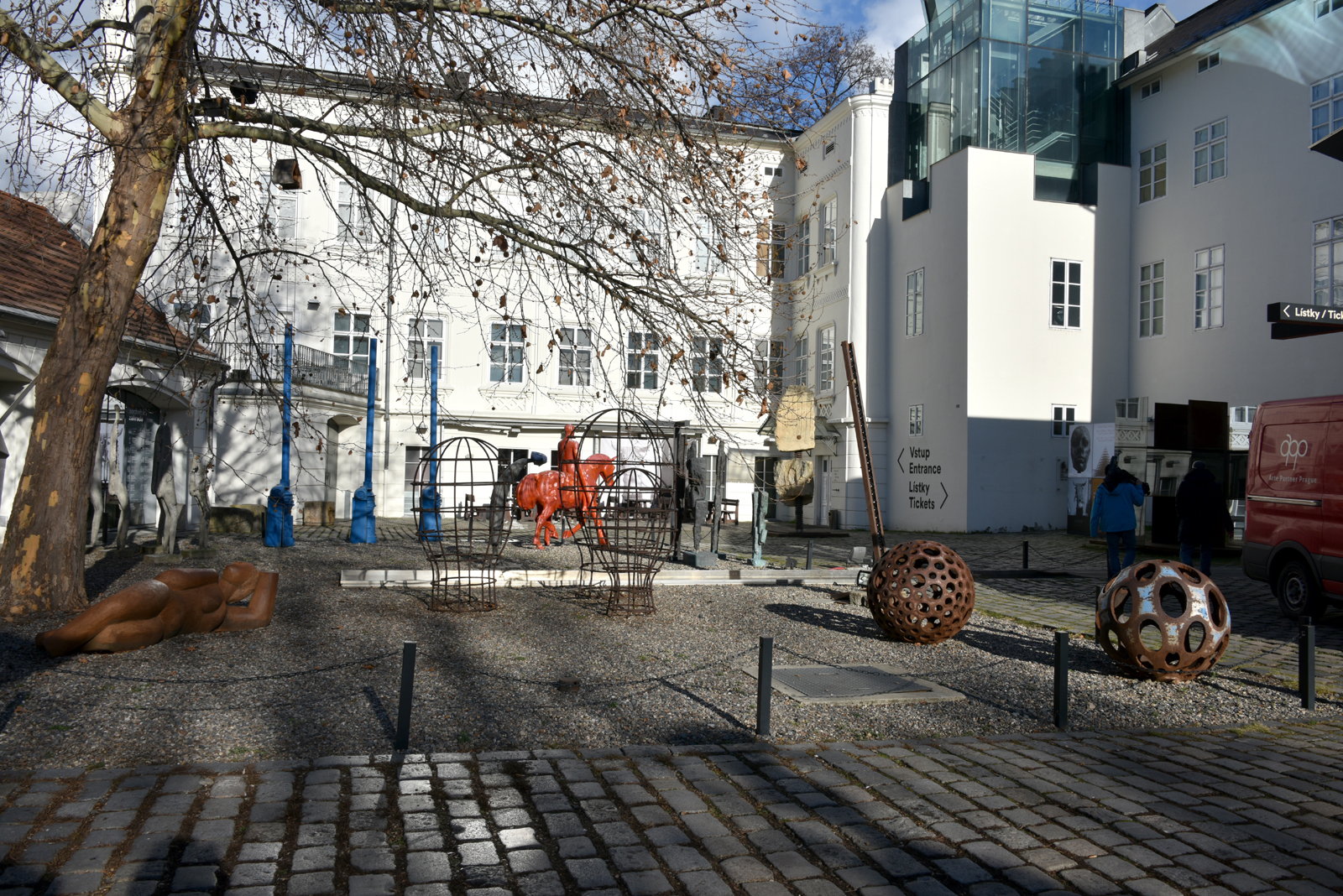
Courtyard in 2019, Museum Kampa

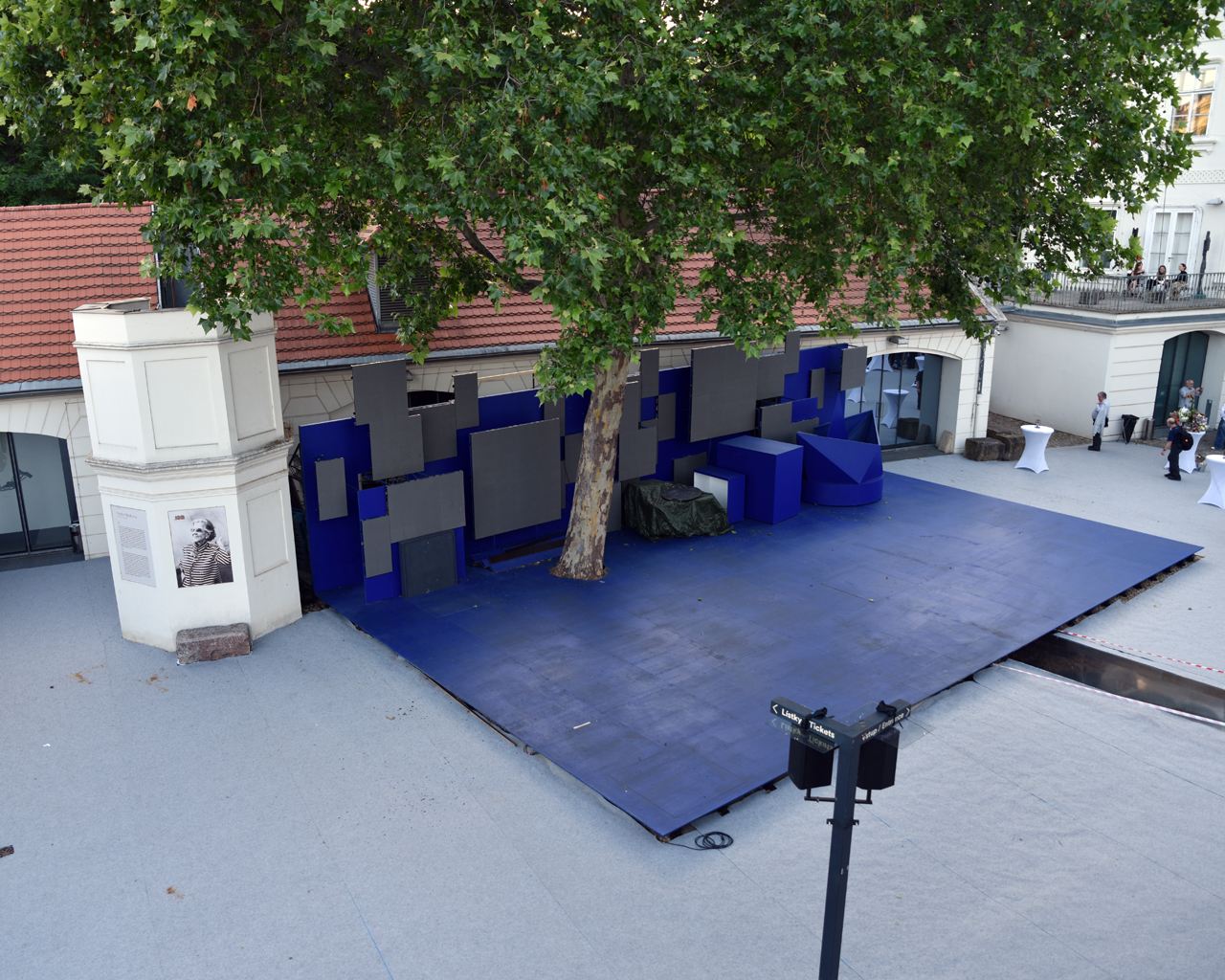
Summer stage (2025), Museum Kampa

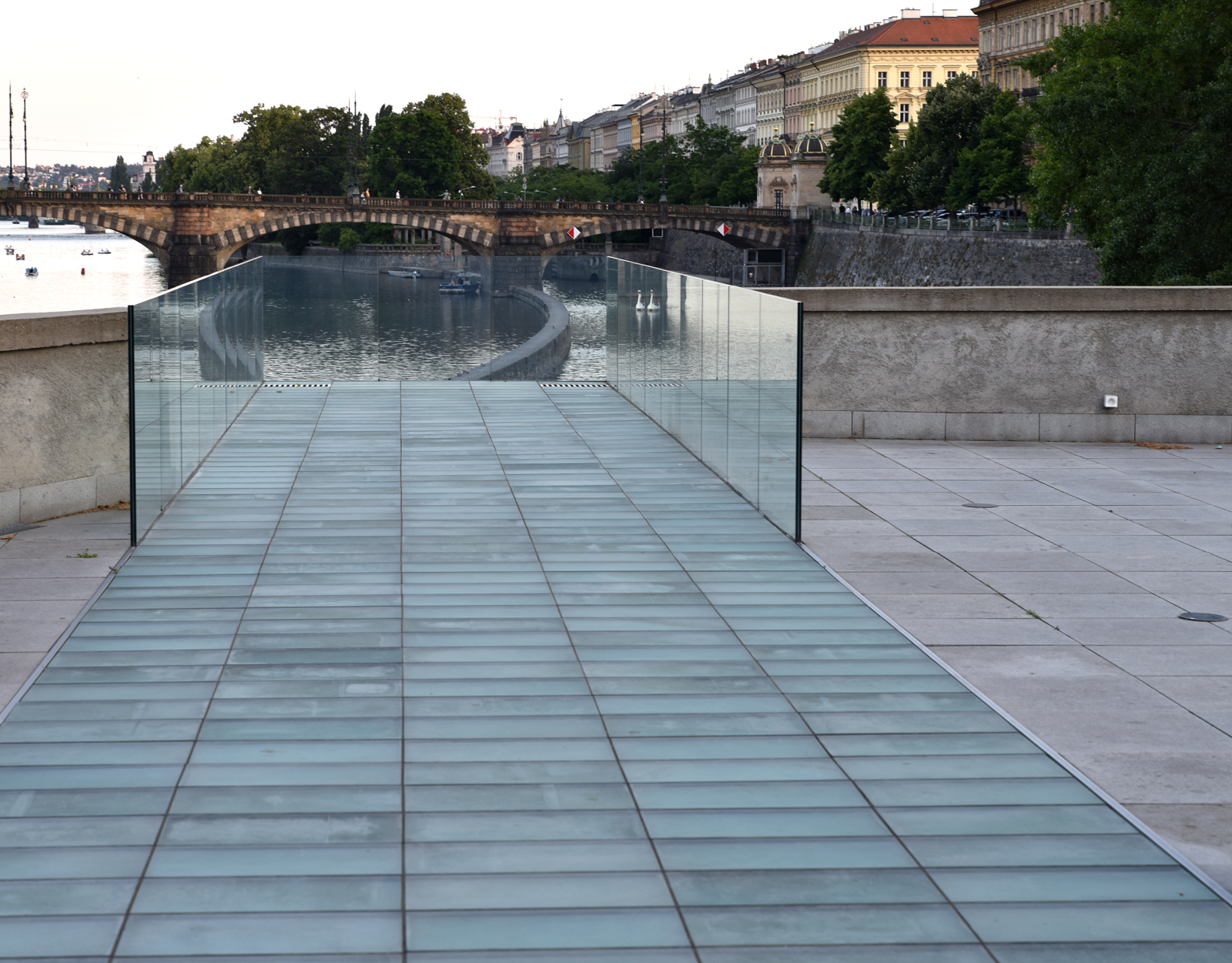
Václav Cigler, Meeting Place on the terrace (2009)

== Collections ==
=== Outdoor exhibition ===
Meda Mládková proposed the establishment of a sculpture park in Kampa Island, but only some of the sculptures in the immediate vicinity of the buildings were realized from the original plan - the glass object "Cube" by Marian Karel, the "Babies" by David Černý, a sandstone sculpture by Miloslav Chlupáč, yellow penguins by the Cracking Art Group, a giant wooden chair by Magdalena Jetelová, reliefs by Viktor Karlík, and Titans by Emilie Beneš Brzezinski.

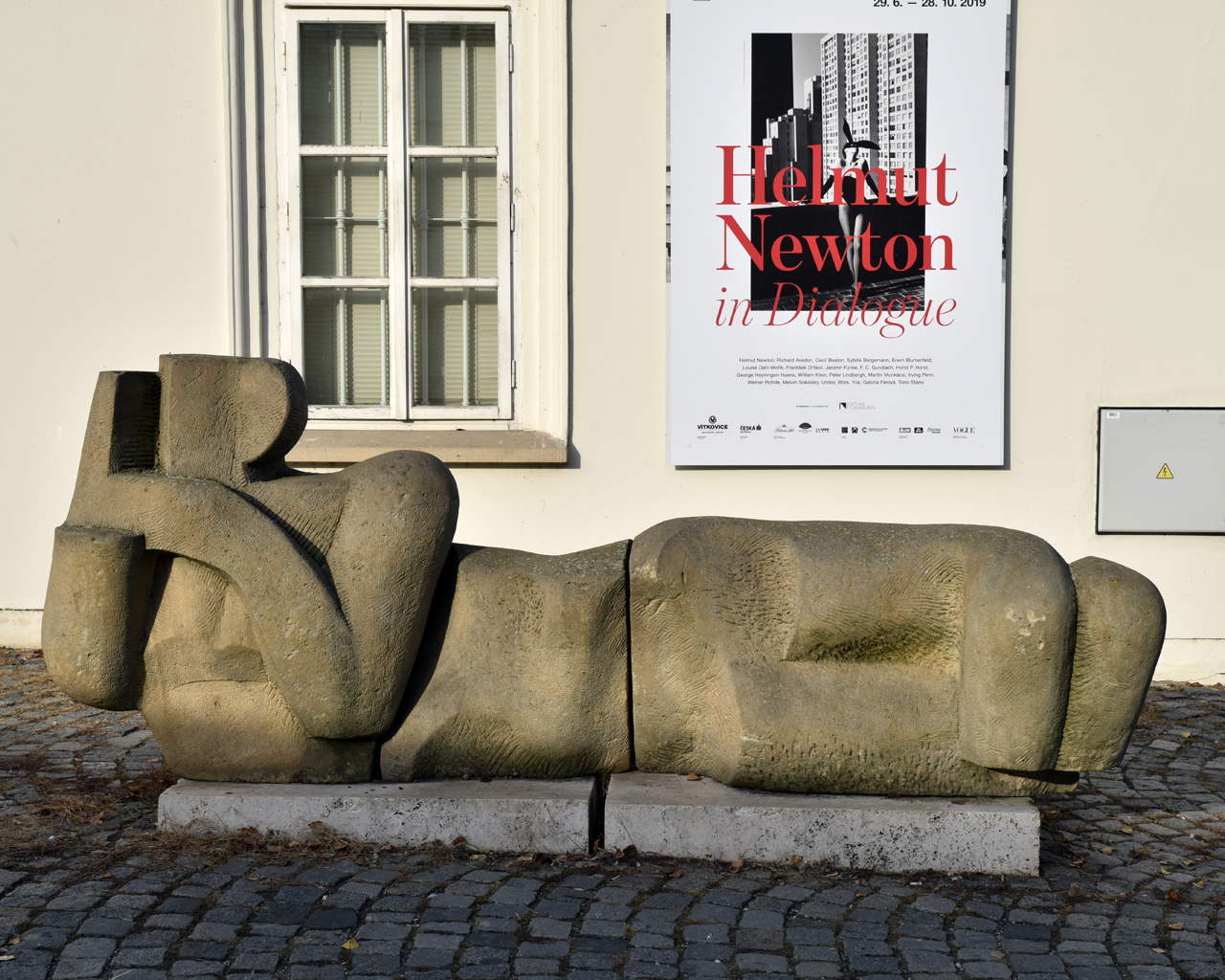
Miloš Chlupáč - Reclining

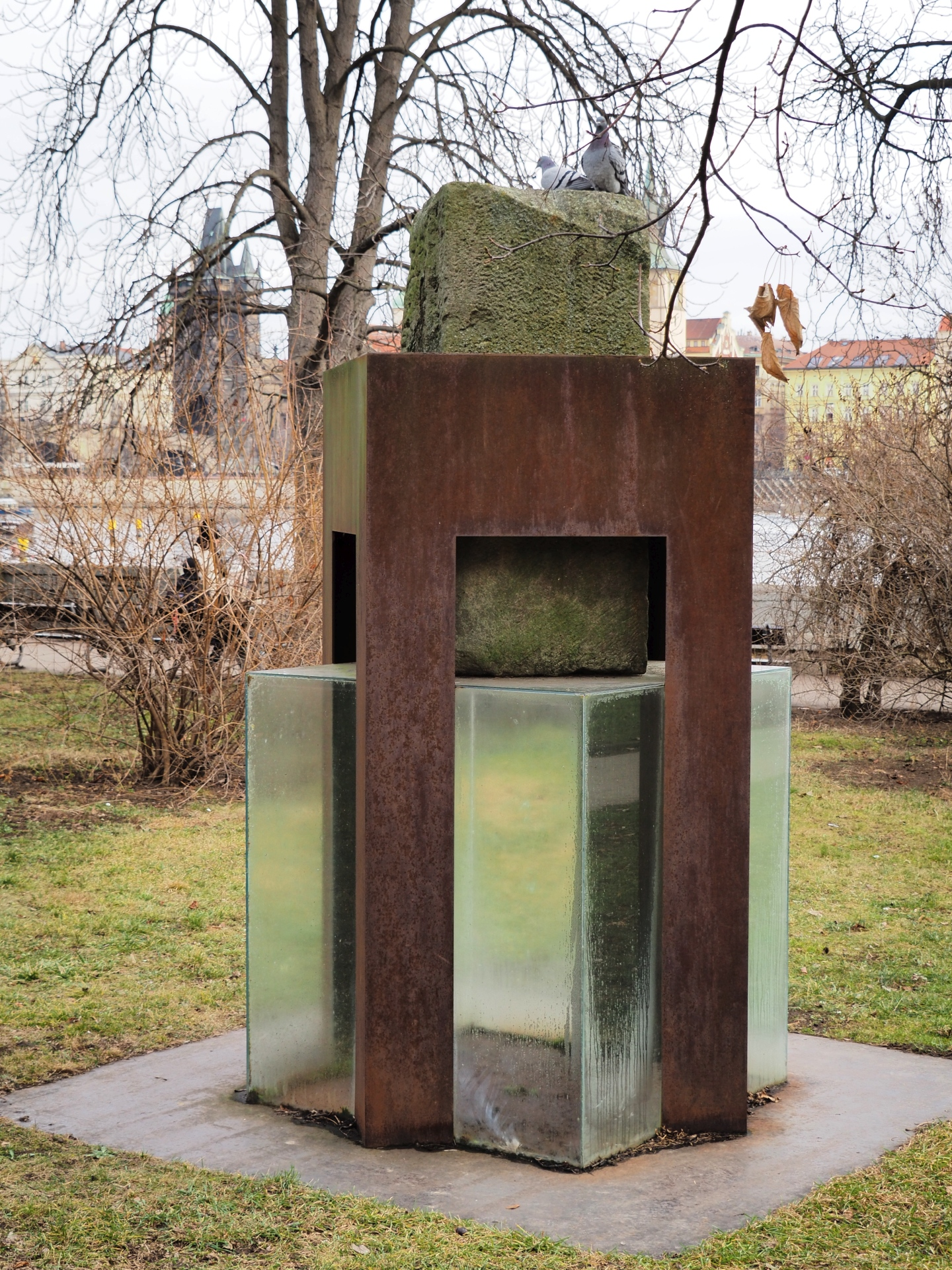
Marian Karel - Cube (2002)

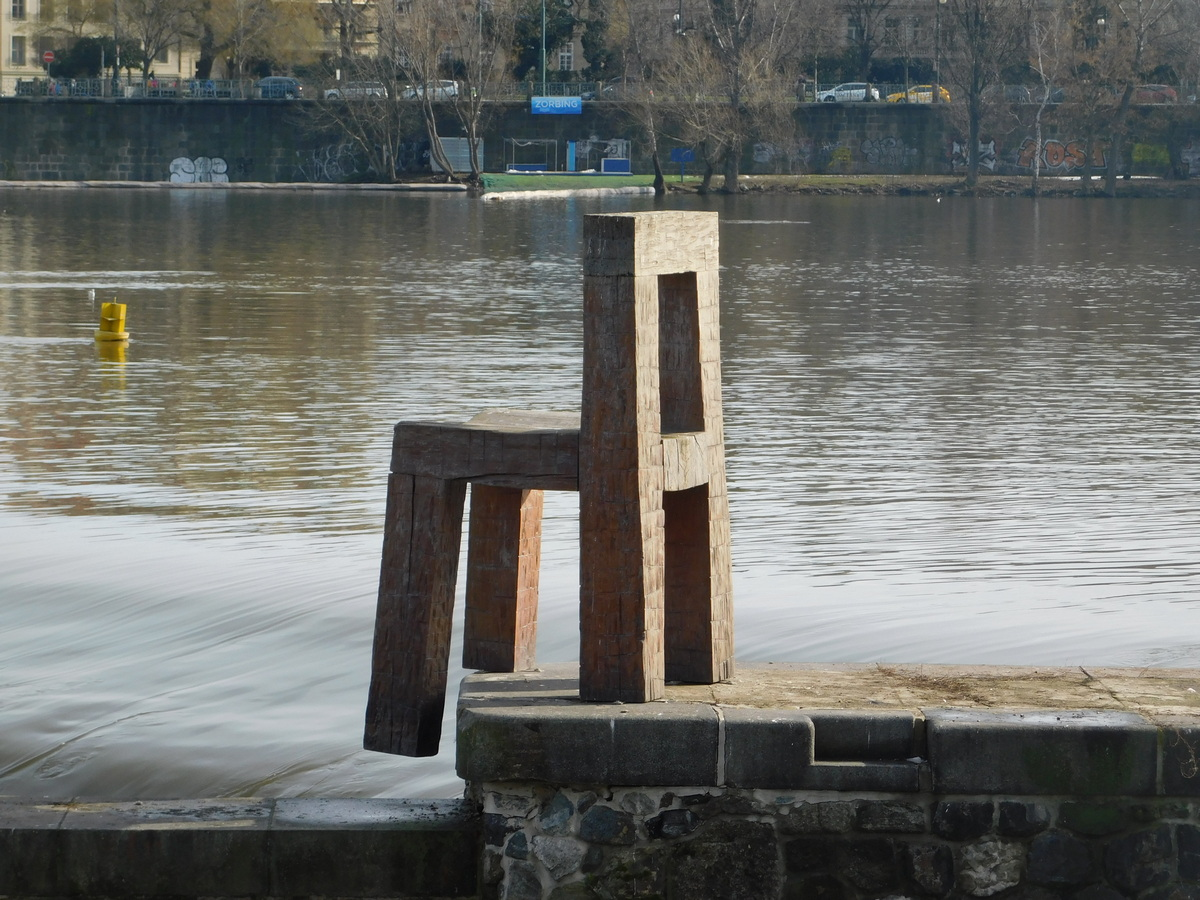
Magdalena Jetelová - Chair

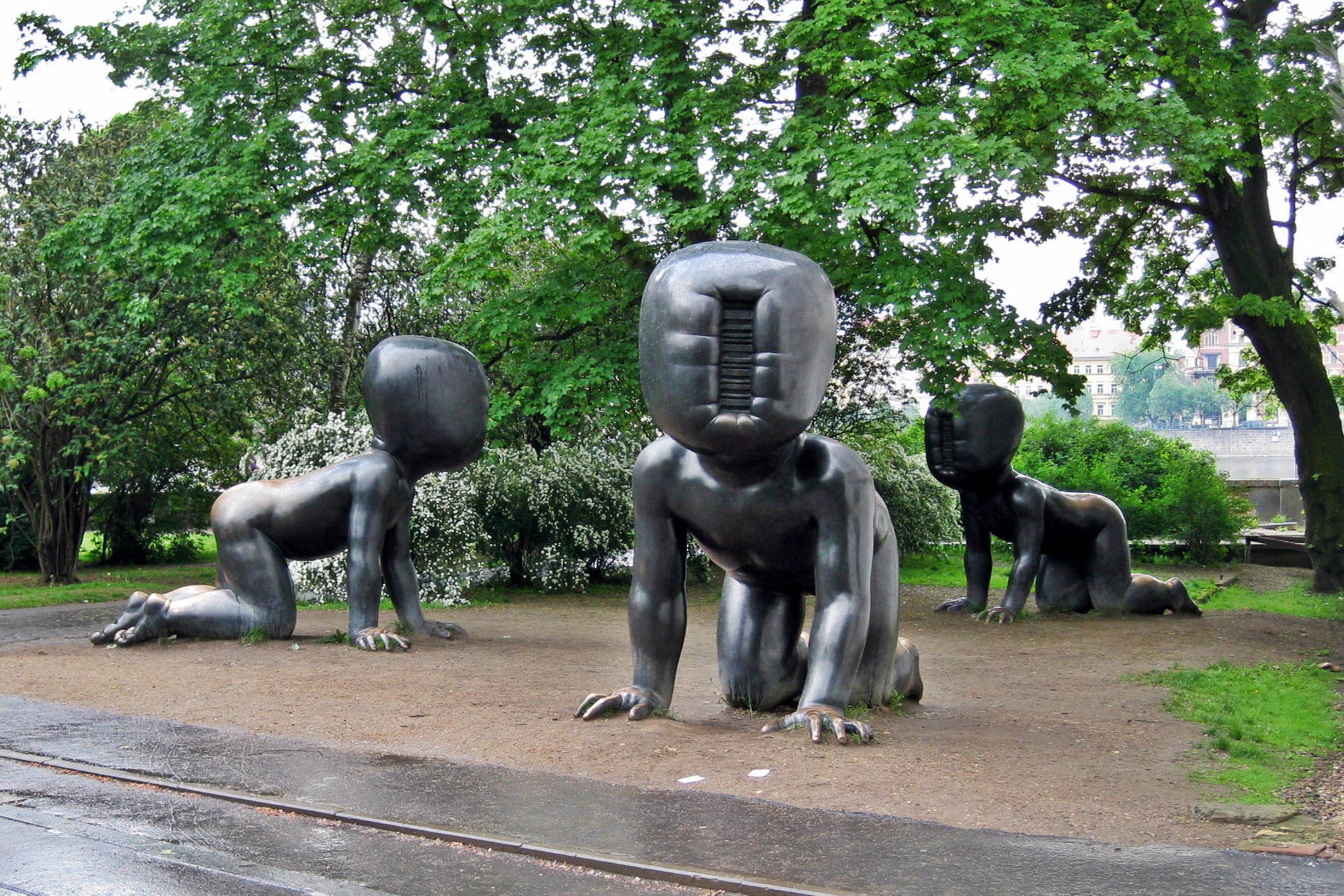
David Černý - Babies

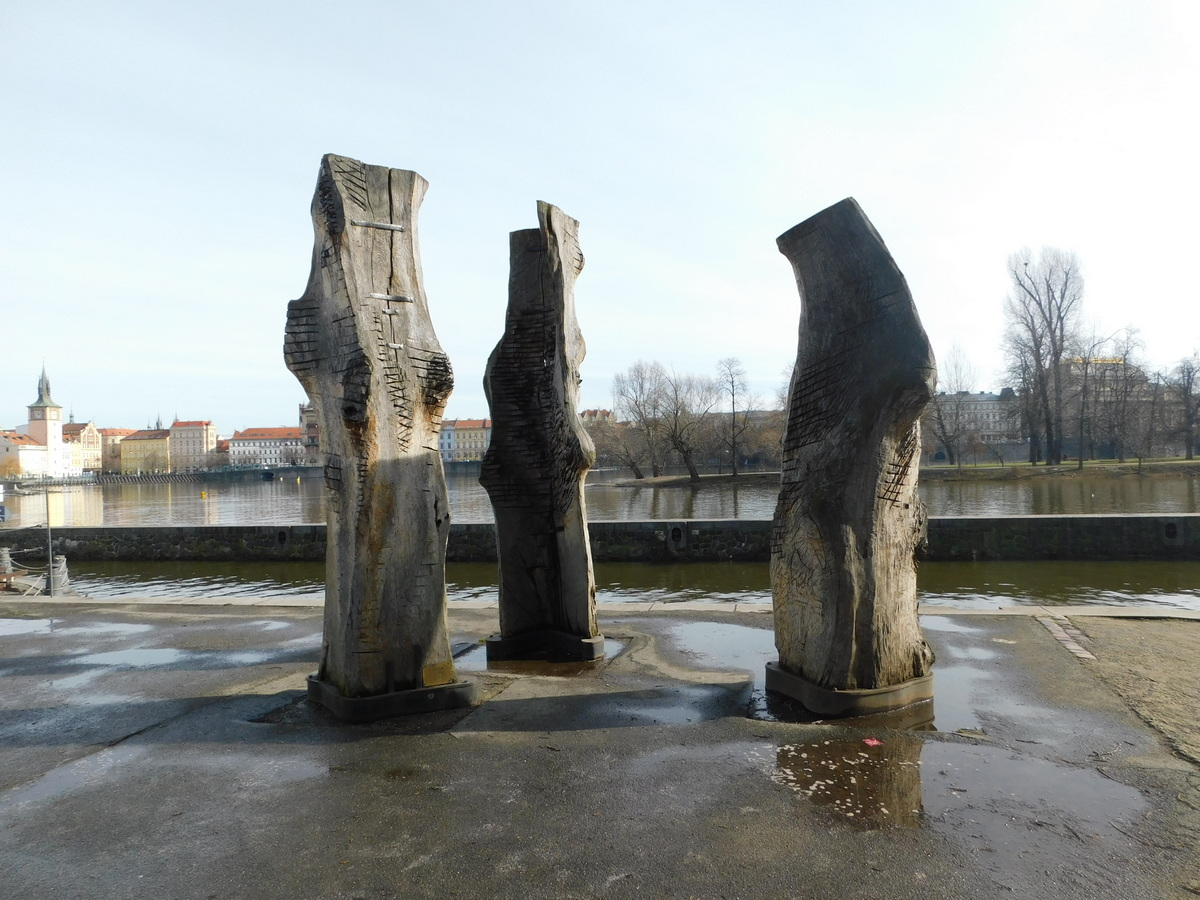
Emilie Benes Brzezinski - Titans

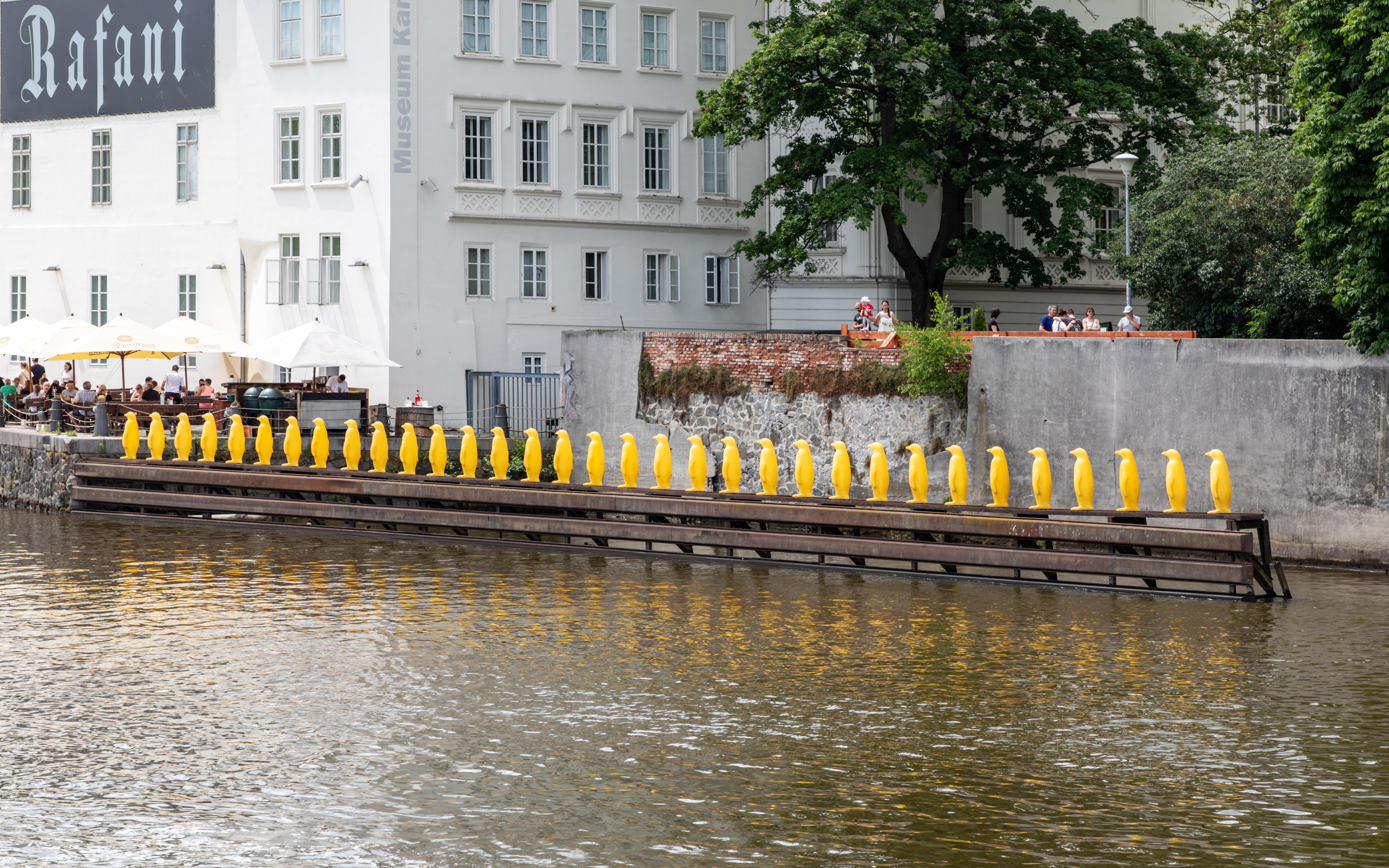
Cracking Art Group, 2008 - Yellow Penguins

The courtyard features a permanent installation of a glass and iron object entitled "Architecture 02-46" by Marian Karel, a reflective relief by Milan Dobeš, "Woman in the Sun" by Eva Kmentová, and sculptures by Aleš Veselý, Olbram Zoubek, Pavel Opočenský, and Michal Gabriel.

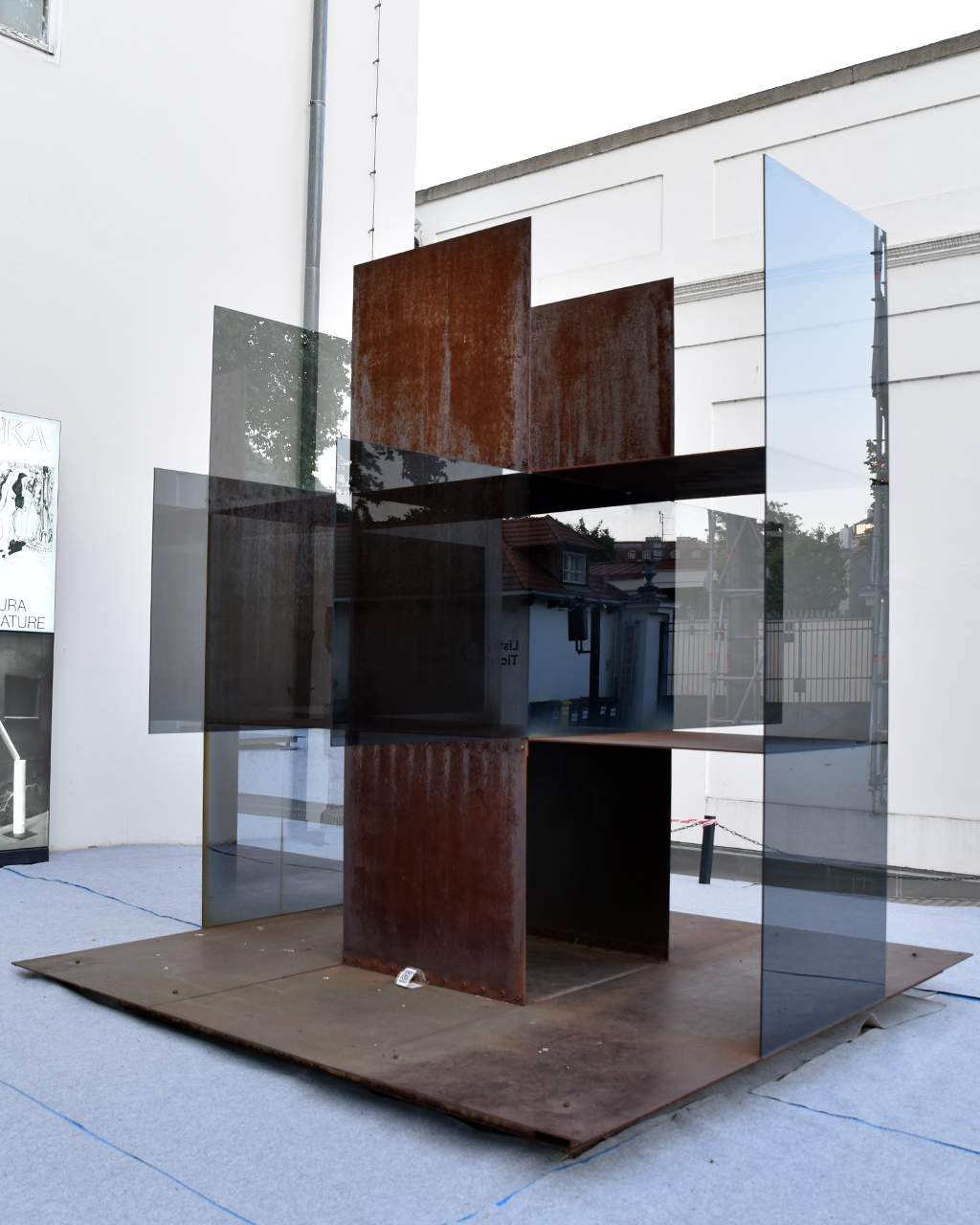
Marian Karel, Architecture, 02 --46, (2002)

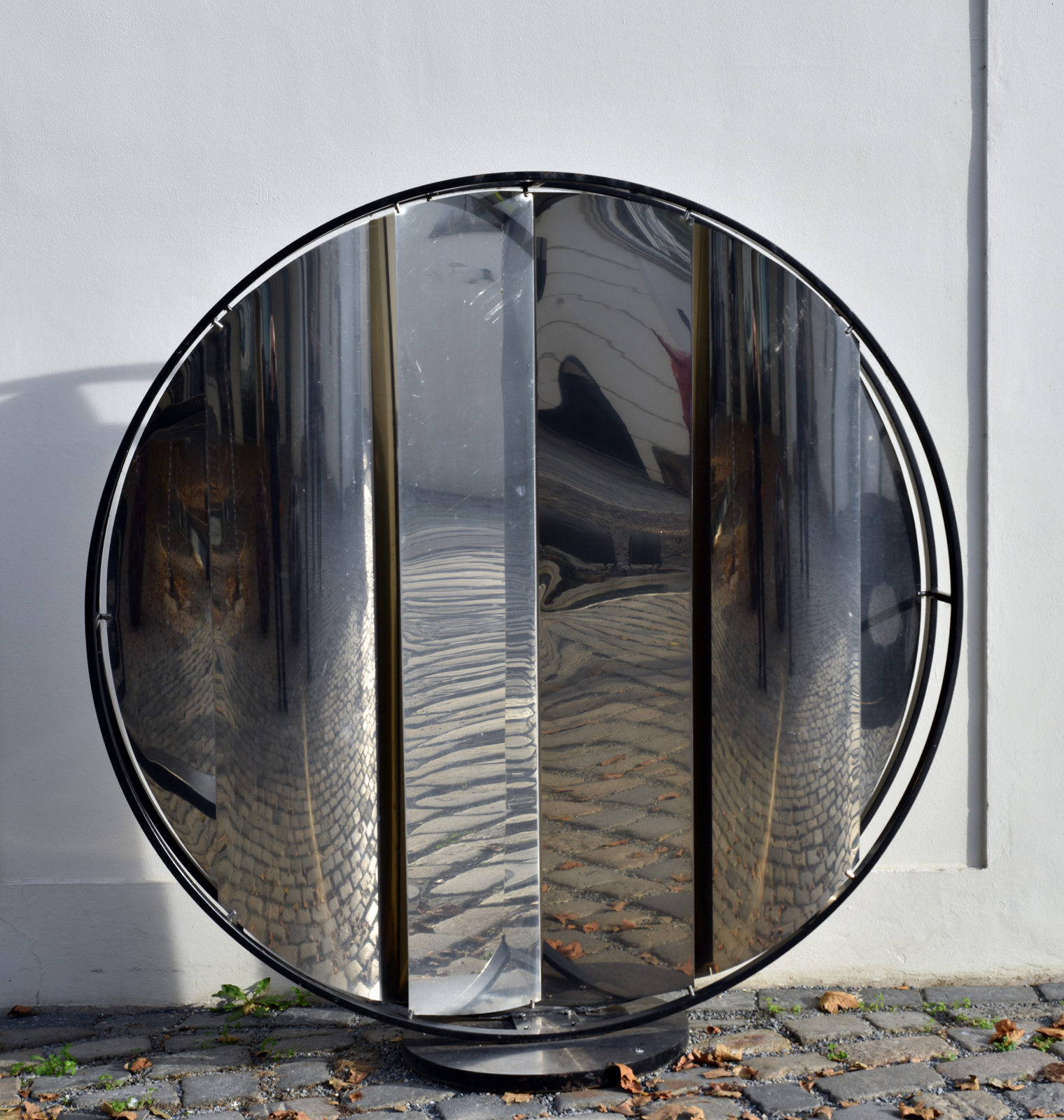
Milan Dobeš, Reflective relief

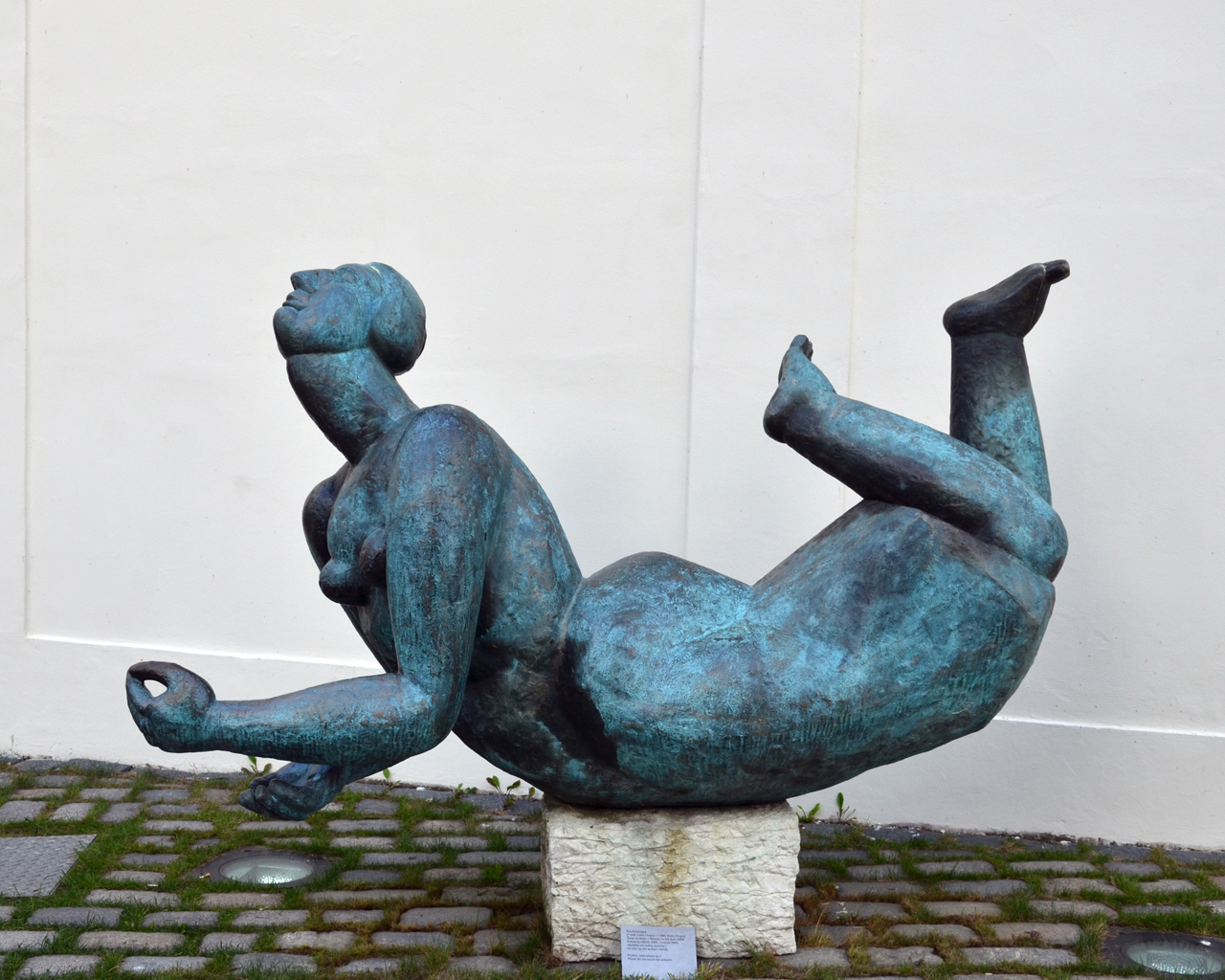
Eva Kmentová, Woman in the Sun

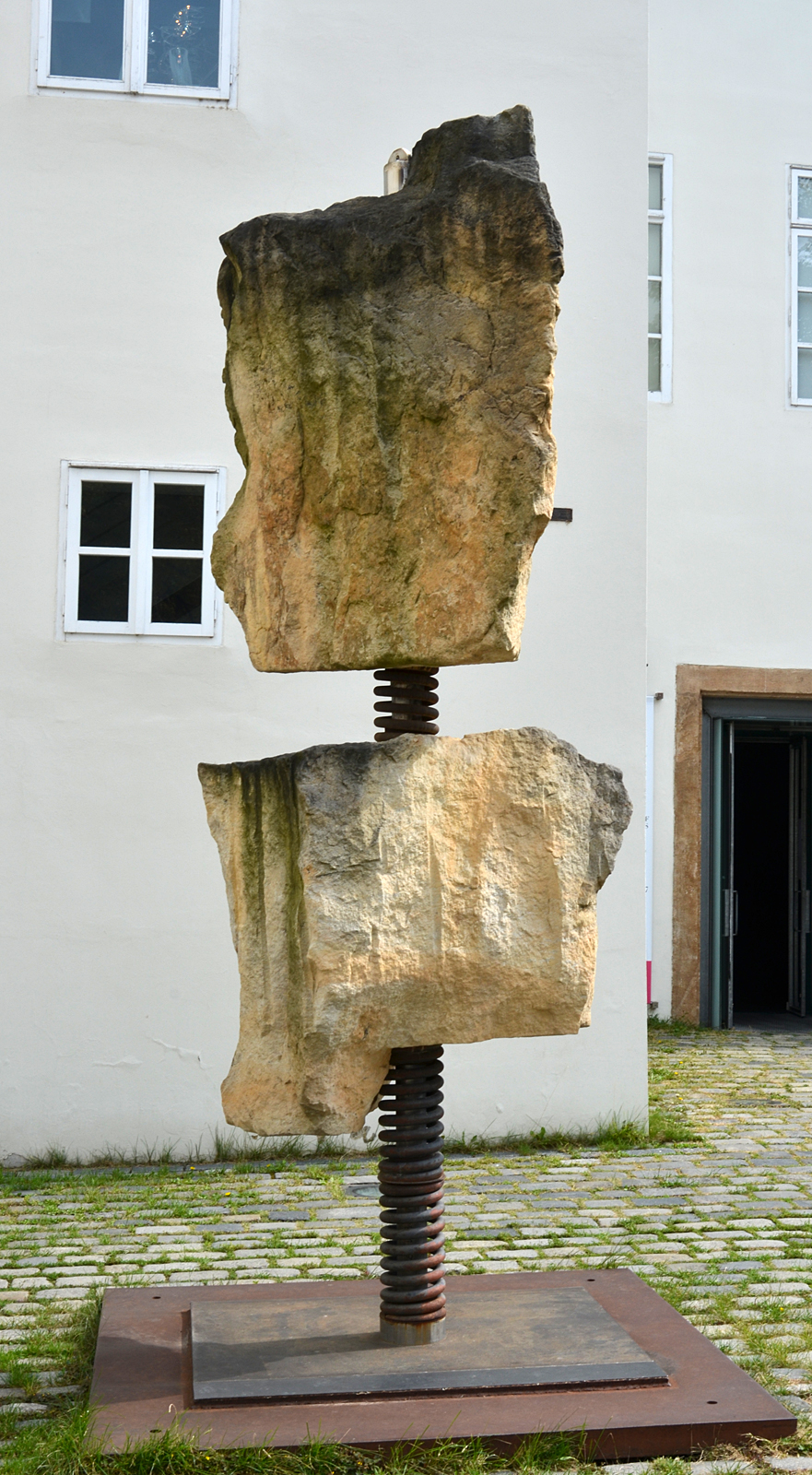
Aleš Veselý, Sculpture

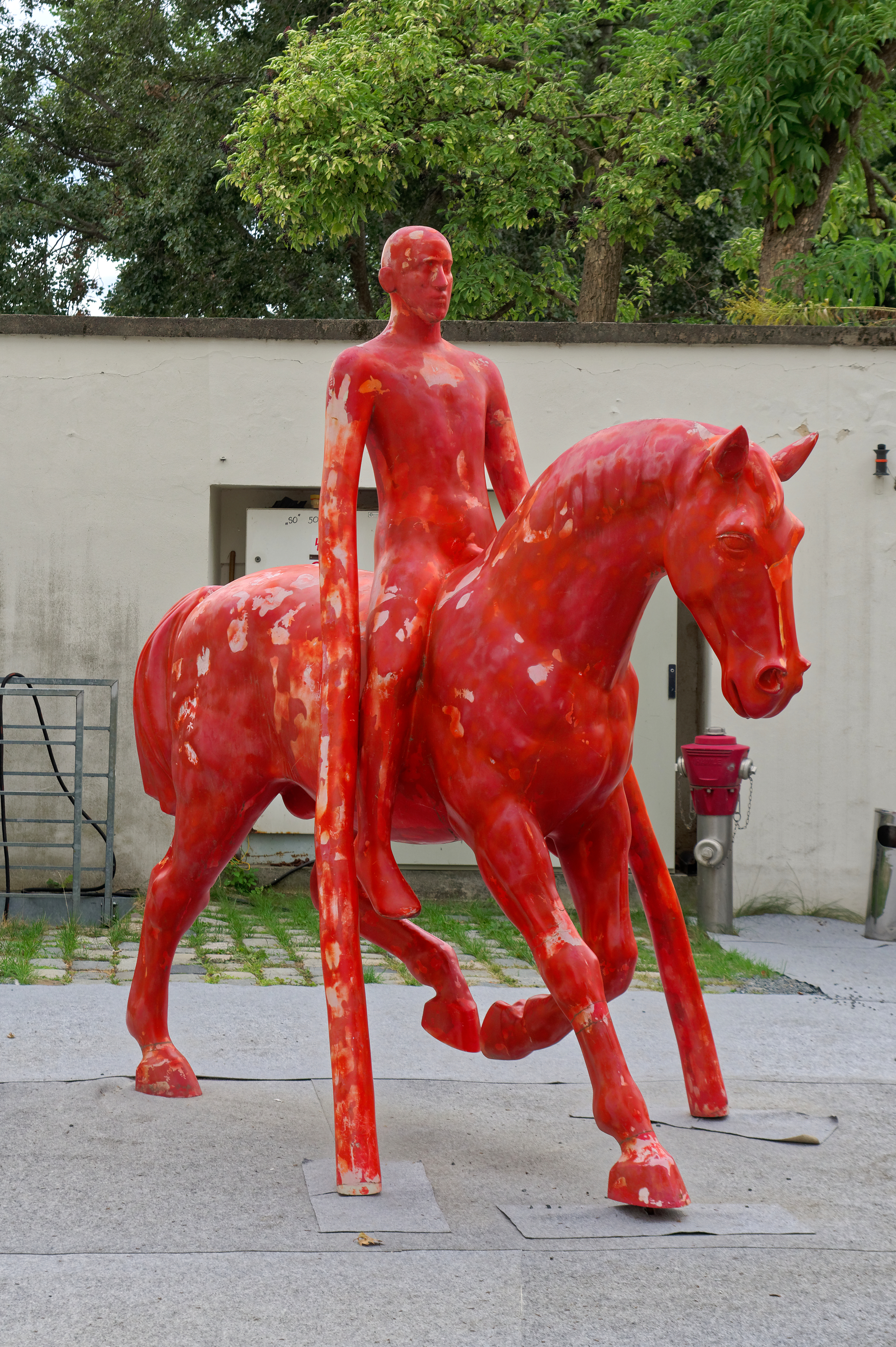
Michal Gabriel, Rider

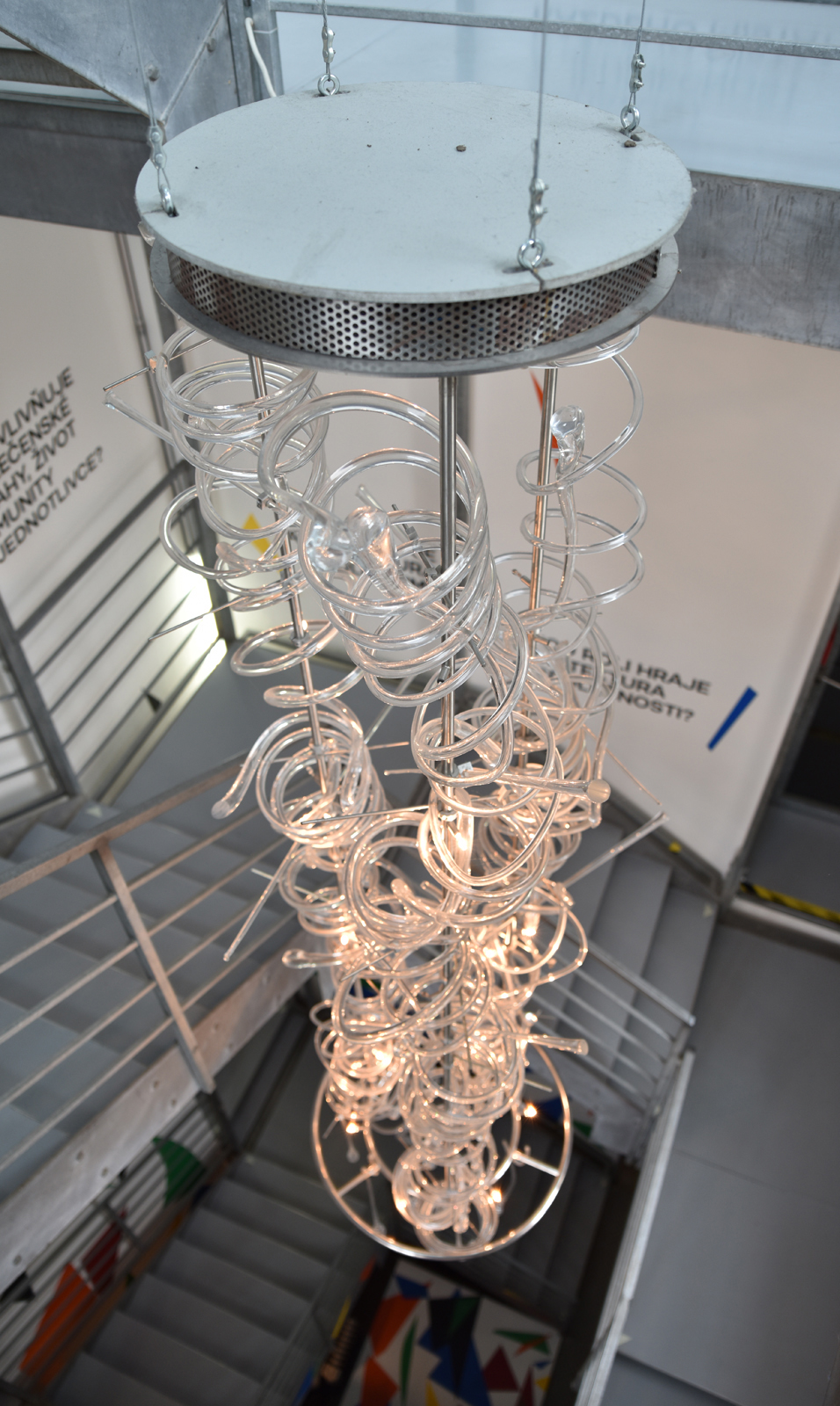
René Roubíček, Chandelier

=== Indoor art installation ===
The main building of the museum houses a permanent art installation of 17 bronze sculptures by Otto Gutfreund from the collection of Jan and Meda Mládek, as well as paintings and graphic prints by František Kupka. A chandelier made of bent glass rods by René Roubíček hangs in the interior staircase.

==== Collection of works by František Kupka ====
In the 1950s, Meda Mládková studied art history at the Sorbonne in Paris and actively sought out František Kupka, who was virtually unknown in Paris and banned in Bohemia, at his studio, where she purchased the first painting for her collection. Thanks to her intuition and keen perception, she gradually acquired a significant collection of Kupka's paintings, which attests to the painter's importance as the founder of abstract art. The collection includes some of Kupka's first abstract paintings from 1911 to 1912, Amorpha - Warm Chromatics (exhibited in Paris at the Salon d'Automne in 1912) and a study for the painting Amorpha - Two-Color Fugue (the final version of the painting was purchased by the National Gallery in Prague from the Waldes Collection), as well as color studies for the paintings Cosmic Spring and Stories of Pistils and Stamen, and early abstract paintings from 1912 to 1913, Cathedral and Marketplace. The painting Arrangement of Graphic Movements II (1912–1913) was donated by the Mládek couple to the National Gallery in Washington.

The collection is also exceptional because communist regime in Czechoslovakia rejected a generous offer from the artist's estate in the 1950s for political reasons. Meda Mládková then unsuccessfully appealed, together with Jaroslav Stránský, to the Czechoslovak exile community to acquire a collection of important Kupka paintings for a future free Czechoslovakia. The Mládek collection is thus the most comprehensive collection of Kupka's work in private ownership, alongside the now dispersed collection of Kupka's patron Jindřich Waldes. It was the exceptional quality of the collection that attracted attention when it was exhibited at the House of the Black Madonna in 1996, when the international significance of Kupka's work had not yet been fully appreciated. The exhibition "František Kupka: Pioneer of Abstraction" was then repeated in a number of foreign galleries (The Hague, Wolfsburg, Dallas, Ixelles). The collection also includes a complete set of Kupka's woodcuts and numerous drawing studies for the cycle "Four Stories in Black and White". In 2011, Meda Mládková managed to purchase 44 paintings and drawings by František Kupka from the private collection of art historian and assistant at the Museum of Modern Art in New York Lilli Lonngren Anders.

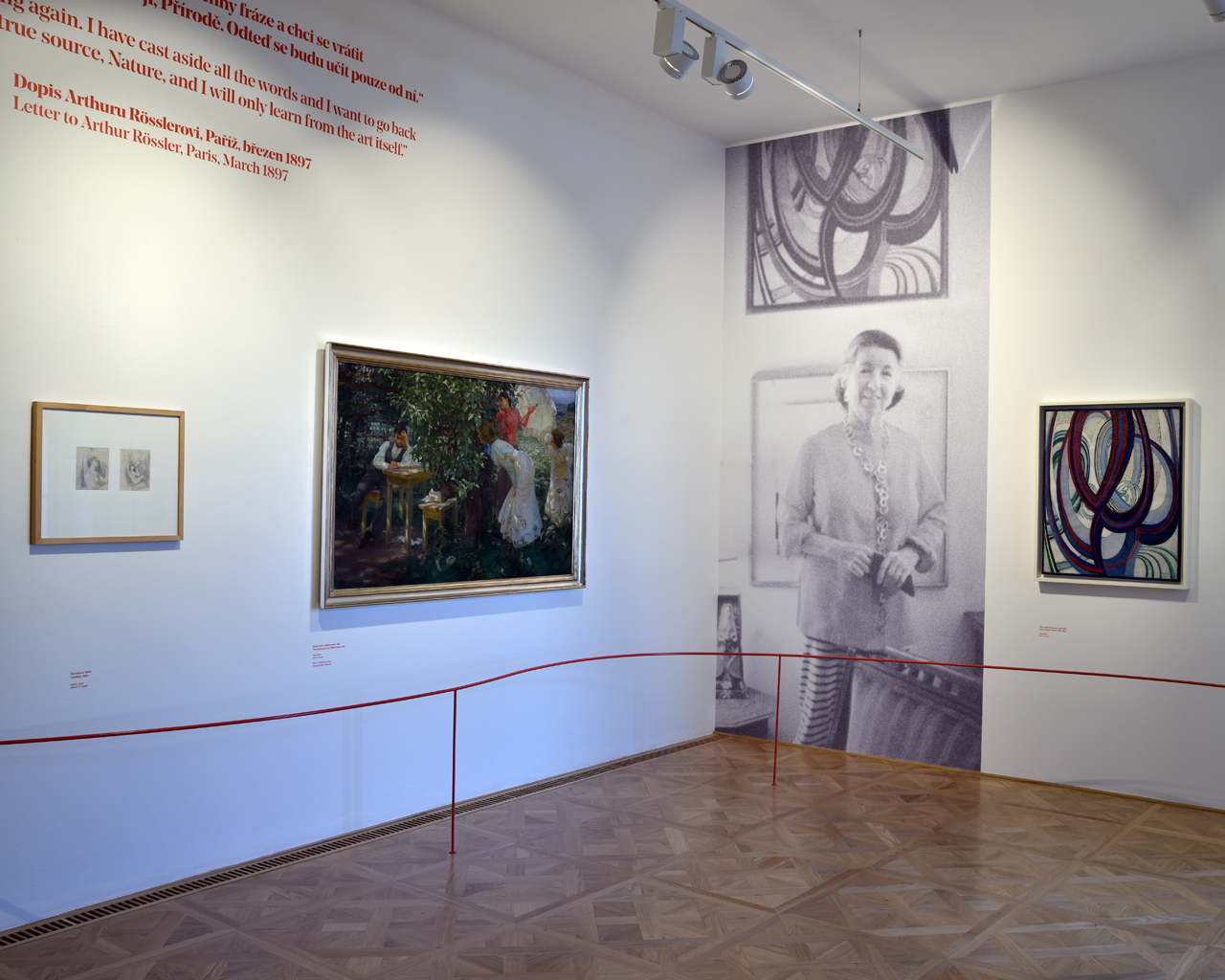
Permanent exhibition I

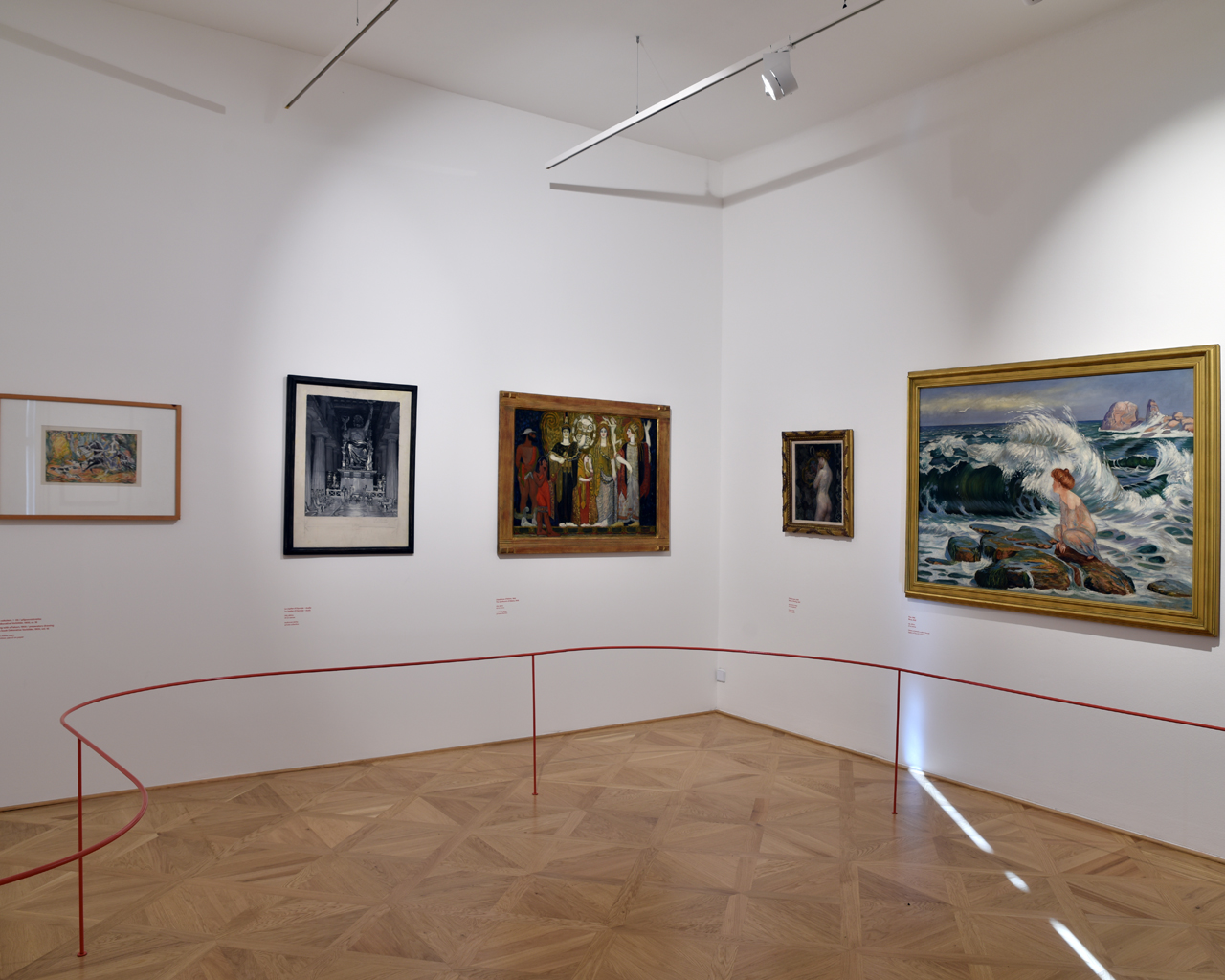
Permanent exhibition I

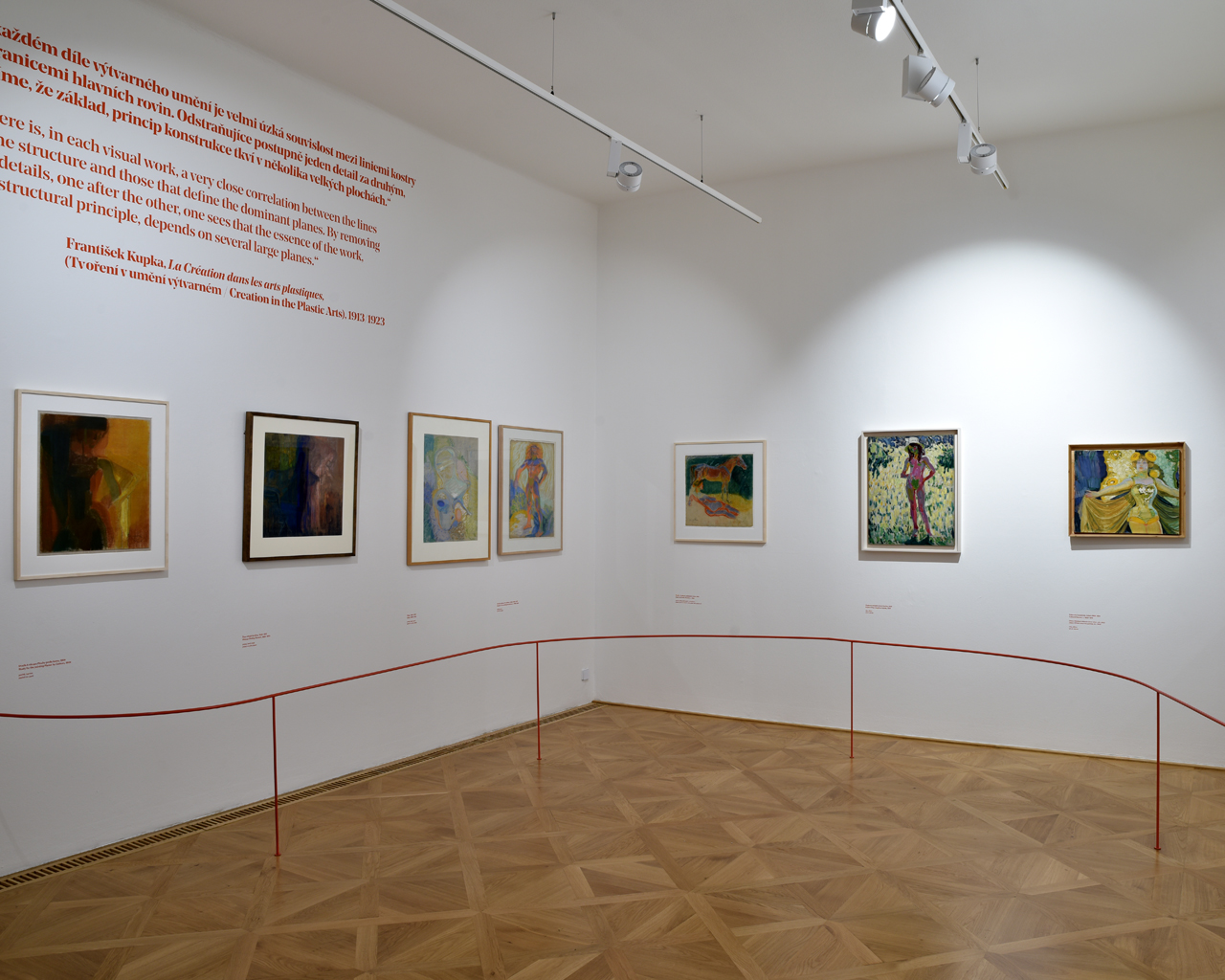
Permanent exhibition I

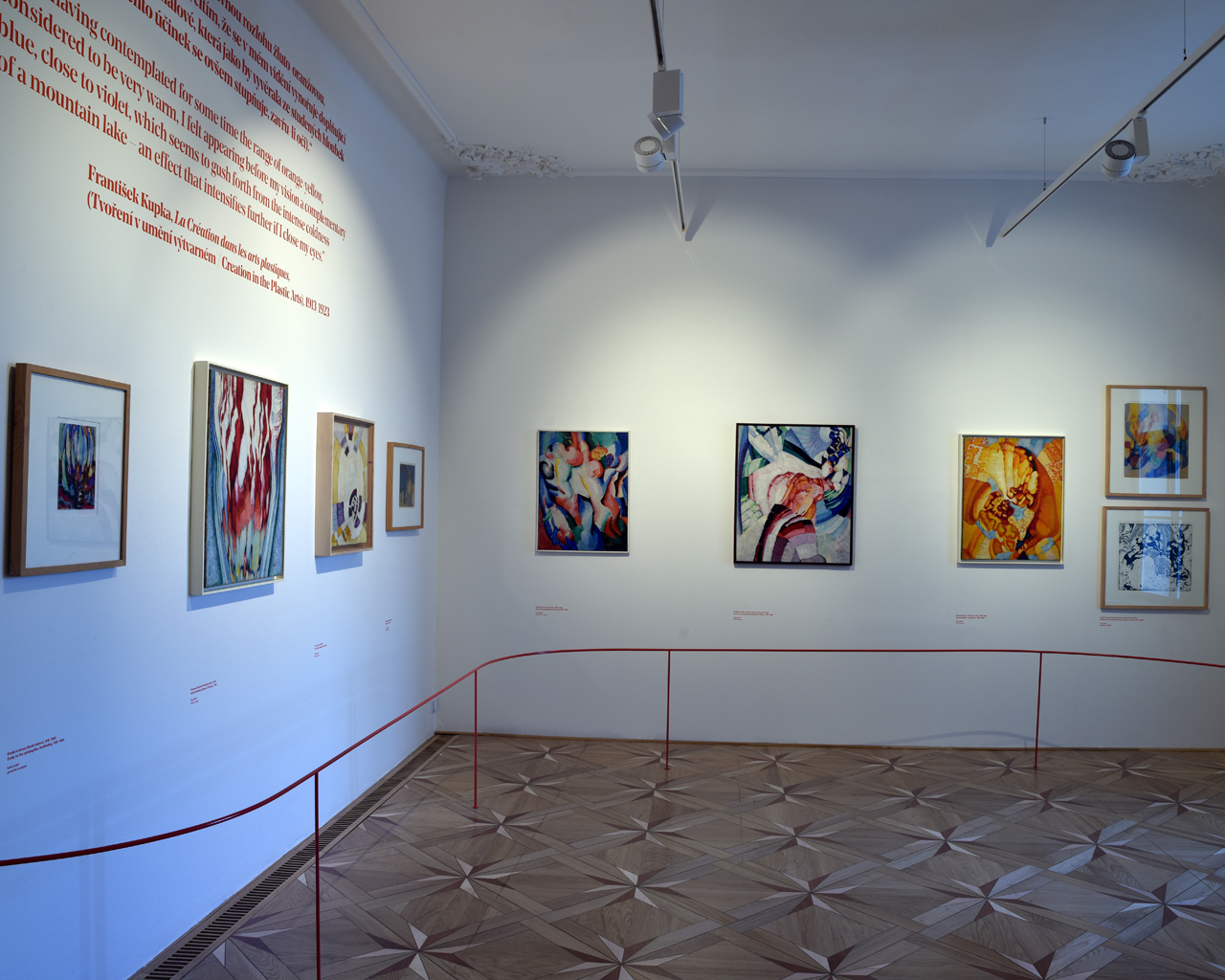
Permanent exhibition I

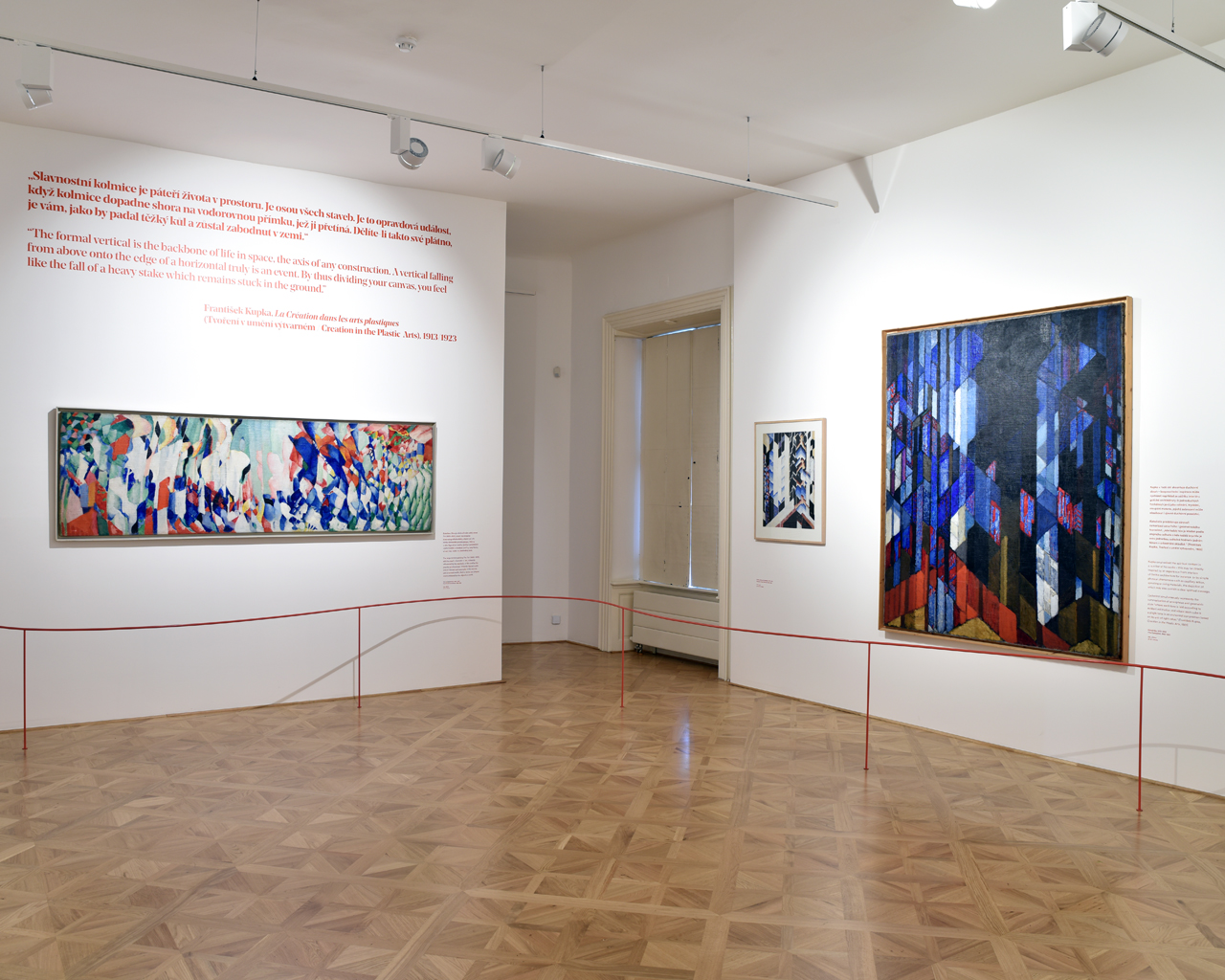
Permanent exhibition I

==== Otto Gutfreund's sculpture collection ====
The Mládek couple followed the art scene in Czechoslovakia and noted in particular the new quality of many artists' work in the second half of the 1960s. Many of them cited the cubist works of Bohumil Kubišta and Otto Gutfreund as their source of inspiration. Gutfreund was little known abroad at the time, and the Mládek couple began systematically purchasing bronze casts of his plaster sculptures. With the help of friends in Prague and Gutfreund's niece Alena Novotná, they acquired a representative collection of his sculptures. At first, only visitors to their apartment could admire them, but later the sculptures Anxiety and Cubist Bust were exhibited on loan at the Hirshhorn Museum and Sculpture Garden in Washington. Meda Mládková wisely recognized the sculptor's contribution to the world avant-garde, and since the 1990s, she has always insisted on the simultaneous exhibition of Gutfreund's Cubist sculptures when lending Kupka's paintings to world galleries.

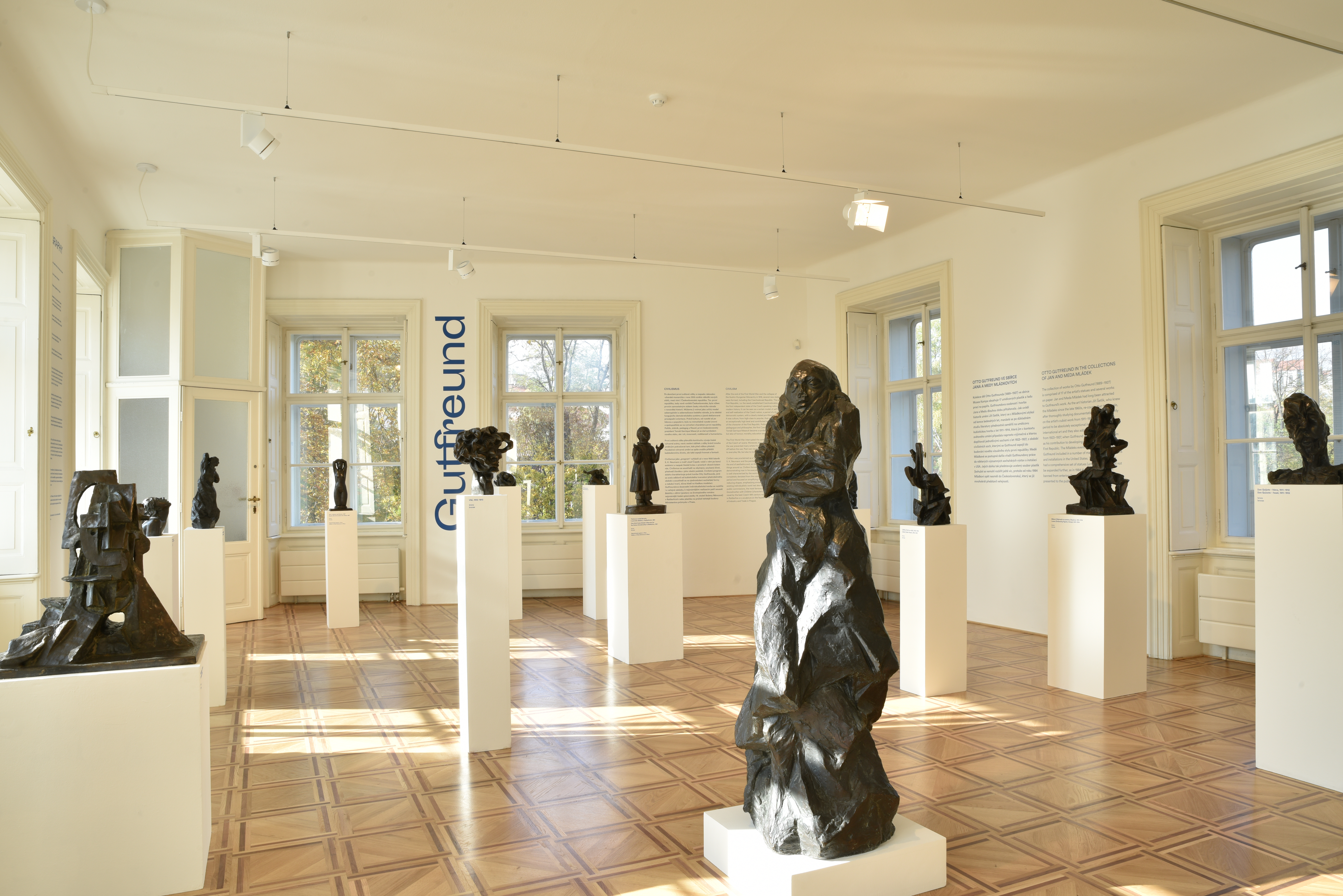
Permanent exhibition II

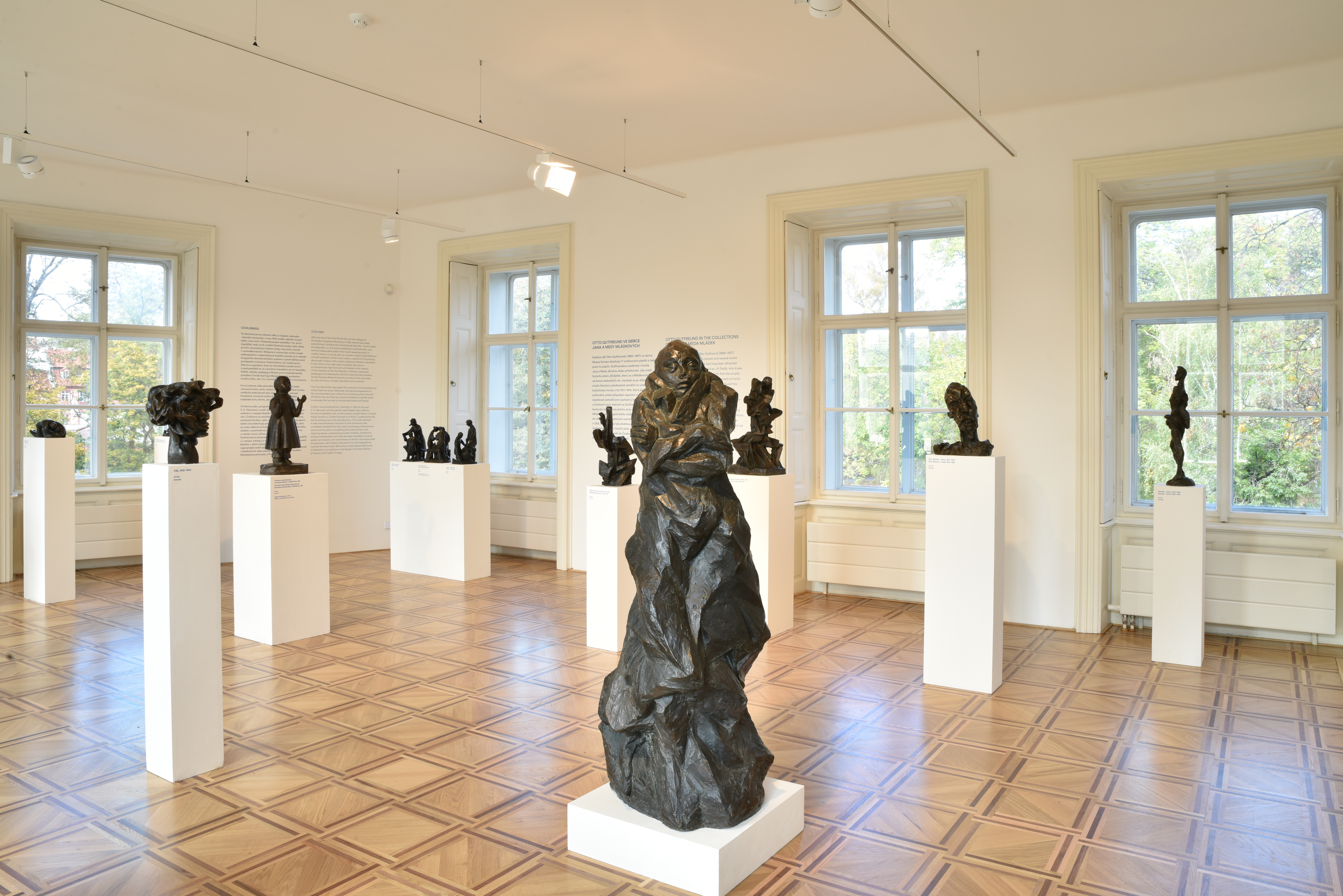
Permanent exhibition II

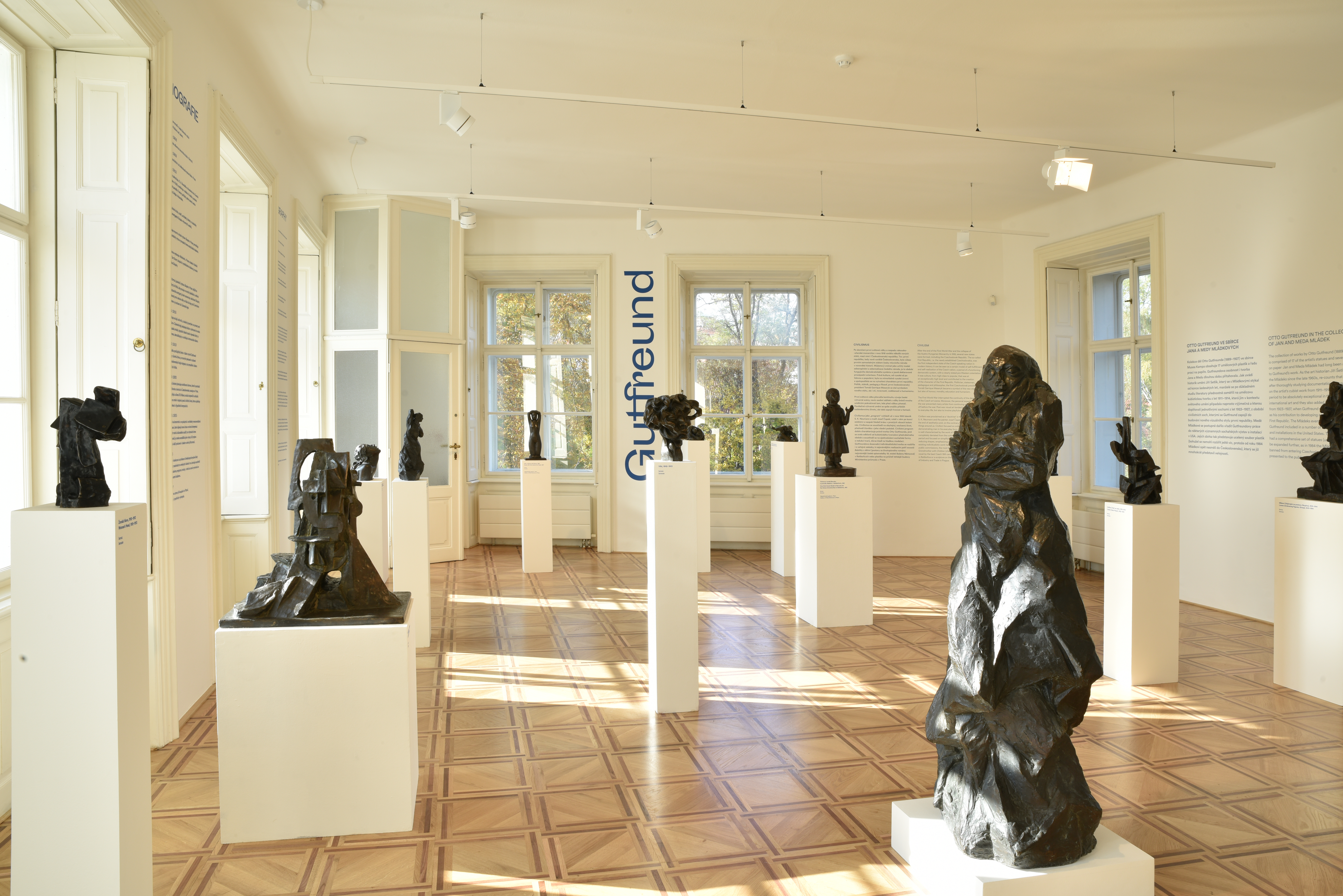
Permanent exhibition II

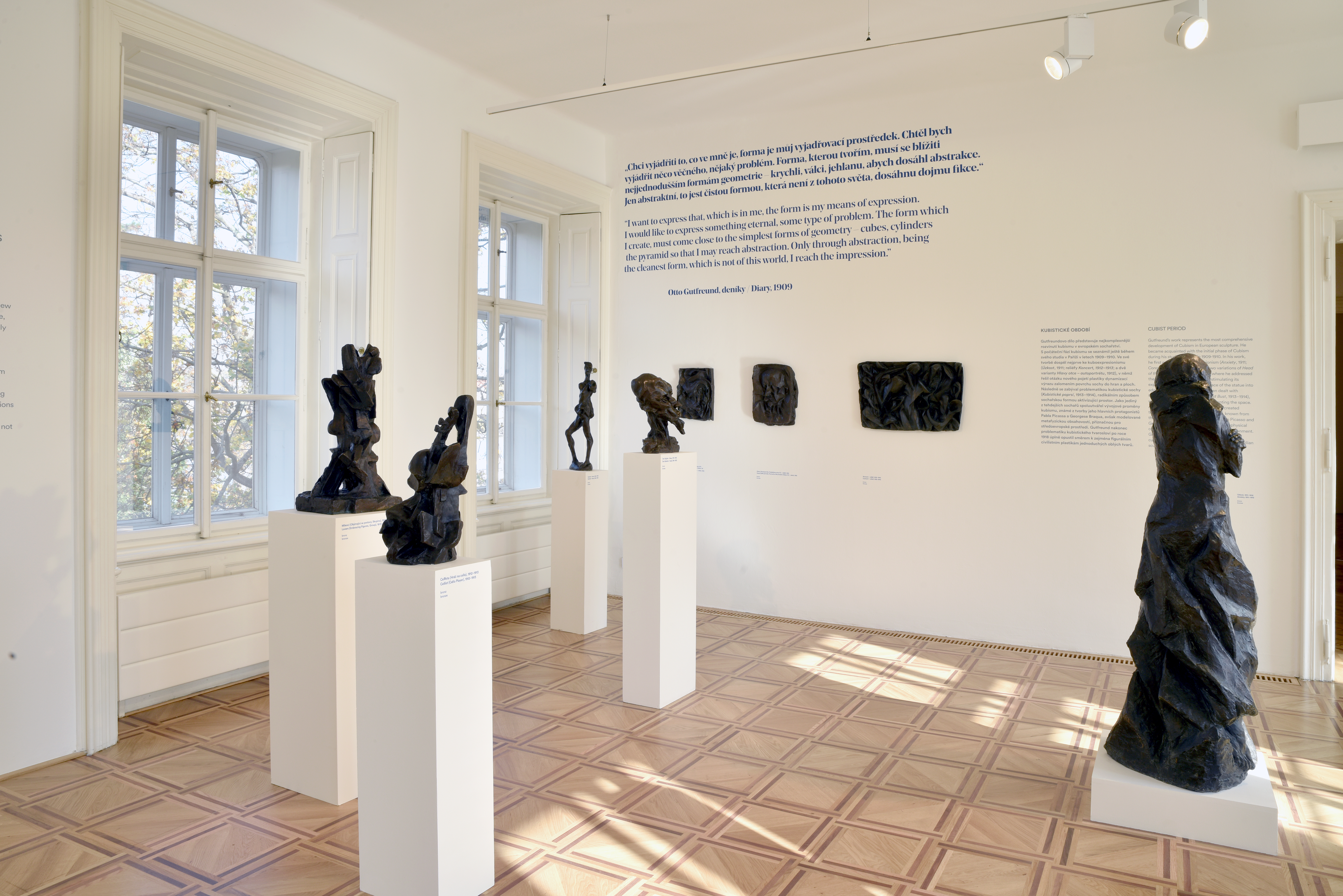
Permanent exhibition II

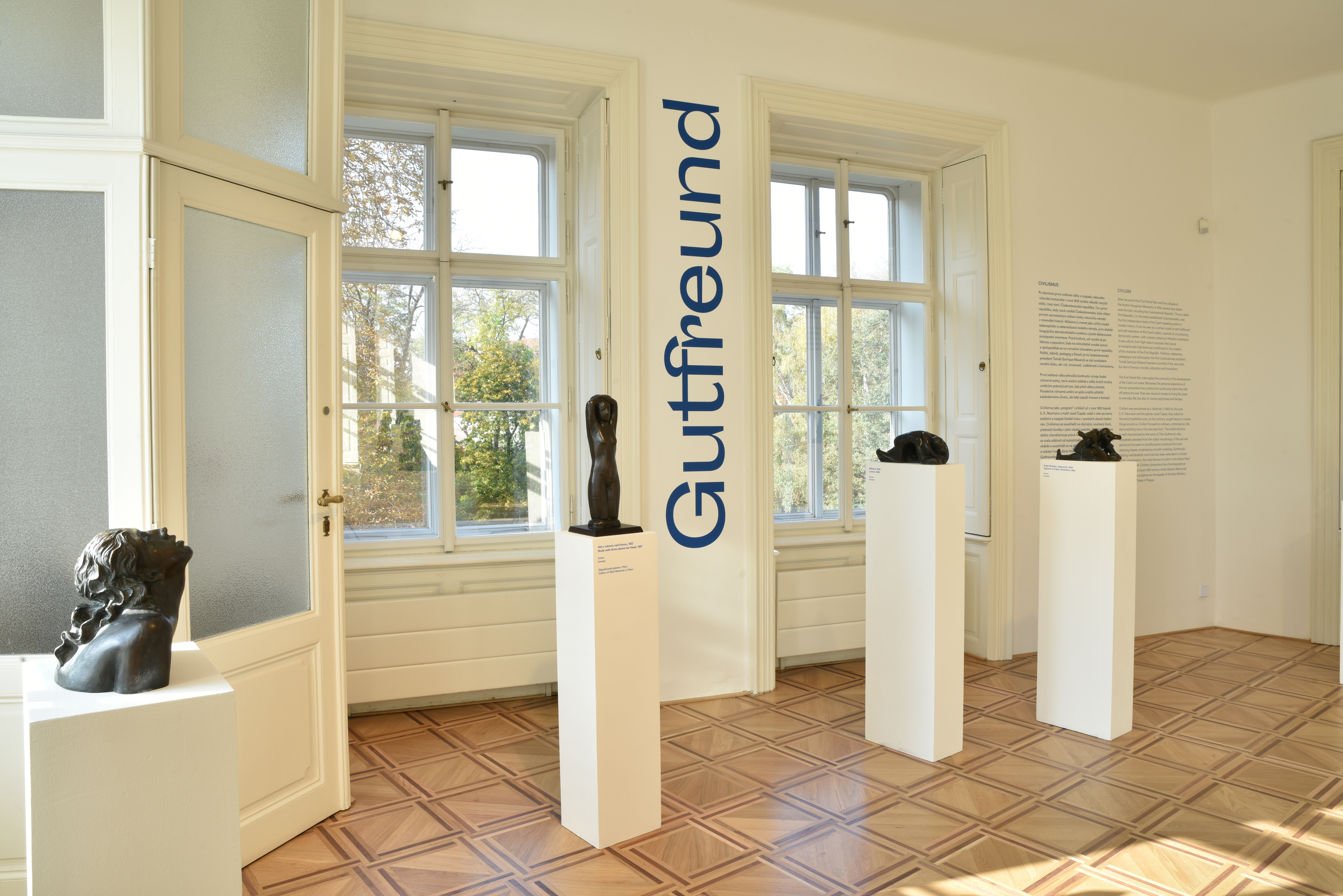
Permanent exhibition II

==== Collection of Czech and Central European Art ====
Meda Mládková systematically collected Czech and Central European artworks from the 1960s to the 1980s. The art of this period was not an escape from reality, but rather a confrontation with harsh political persecusion that artists could not avoid. The works thus carry physical permanence and contain no hints or fleeting words. What determines the special significance of Central European art of this period can be understood (more obviously than in Western countries) as a path to freedom through art. Under the title "Expresiv", some of the works were exhibited in 1987–1988 at the Museum Moderner Kunst in Vienna and then at the Hirshhorn Museum and Sculpture Garden in Washington, D.C., and then became part of the collection of the Kampa Museum (Magdalena Abakanowicz, Magdalena Jetelová, Karel Nepraš, György Jovánovics, Józef Łukomski, Karel Malich, Jiří Načeradský, Mića Popović, Branko Ružić, Adriena Šimotová, Otakar Slavík, Aleš Veselý, etc.). The curator was Meda Mládková together with Dieter Ronte, director of the Mumok.

==== Czech and Slovak art ====
According to Meda Mládková, the late 1960s were perhaps the most productive period in the history of Czech art, following long years of cultural darkness since the 1948 Czechoslovak coup d'état. During the so-called Prague Spring, thanks to the newly acquired freedom of expression, art experienced a sudden burst of energy, vitality, and prosperity that surprised even Western art historians, who often had to hide their envy of this creativity and imagination. After the Soviet occupation in August 1968, most renown artists lived for next twenty years in a parallel culture, without the possibility of exhibiting and without contact with foreign art scene.

The following artists are represented in the Kampa Museum collection: Jiří Anderle, Jiří Balcar, Zdeněk Beran (Meda Mládková paid the Art Center for Beran's important work "Rehabilitation Department of Dr. Dr.", but the communist regime did not give permission to export the work, and it eventually fell into disrepair), Jiří Beránek, Václav Boštík, Vladimír Boudník, Hugo Demartini, Milan Dobeš, Stano Filko, Kurt Gebauer, Milan Grygar, Zdenek Hůla, Dalibor Chatrný, Ivan Chatrný, Miloslav Chlupáč, Jozef Jankovič, Vladimír Janoušek, Věra Janoušková, Magdalena Jetelová, Jiří John, Čestmír Kafka, Eva Kmentová, Stanislav Kolíbal, Vladimír Kopecký, Jiří Kornatovský, Radoslav Kratina, Jan Kubíček, Alena Kučerová, Oldřich Kulhánek, Karel Malich, Adéla Matasová, Zdeno Mayerčák, Vladimír Merta, Alex Mlynárčik, Jiří Mrázek, Daisy Mrázková, Jiří Načeradský, Karel Nepraš, Ladislav Novák, Pavel Opočenský, Květa Pacovská, Theodor Pištěk, Naděžda Plíšková, Michal Ranný, Rudolf Sikora, Otakar Slavík, Jiří Sopko, Jiří Sozanský, Václav Stratil, Jitka Svobodová, Zdeněk Sýkora, Adriena Šimotová, Jiří Valenta, Aleš Veselý, Olbram Zoubek.

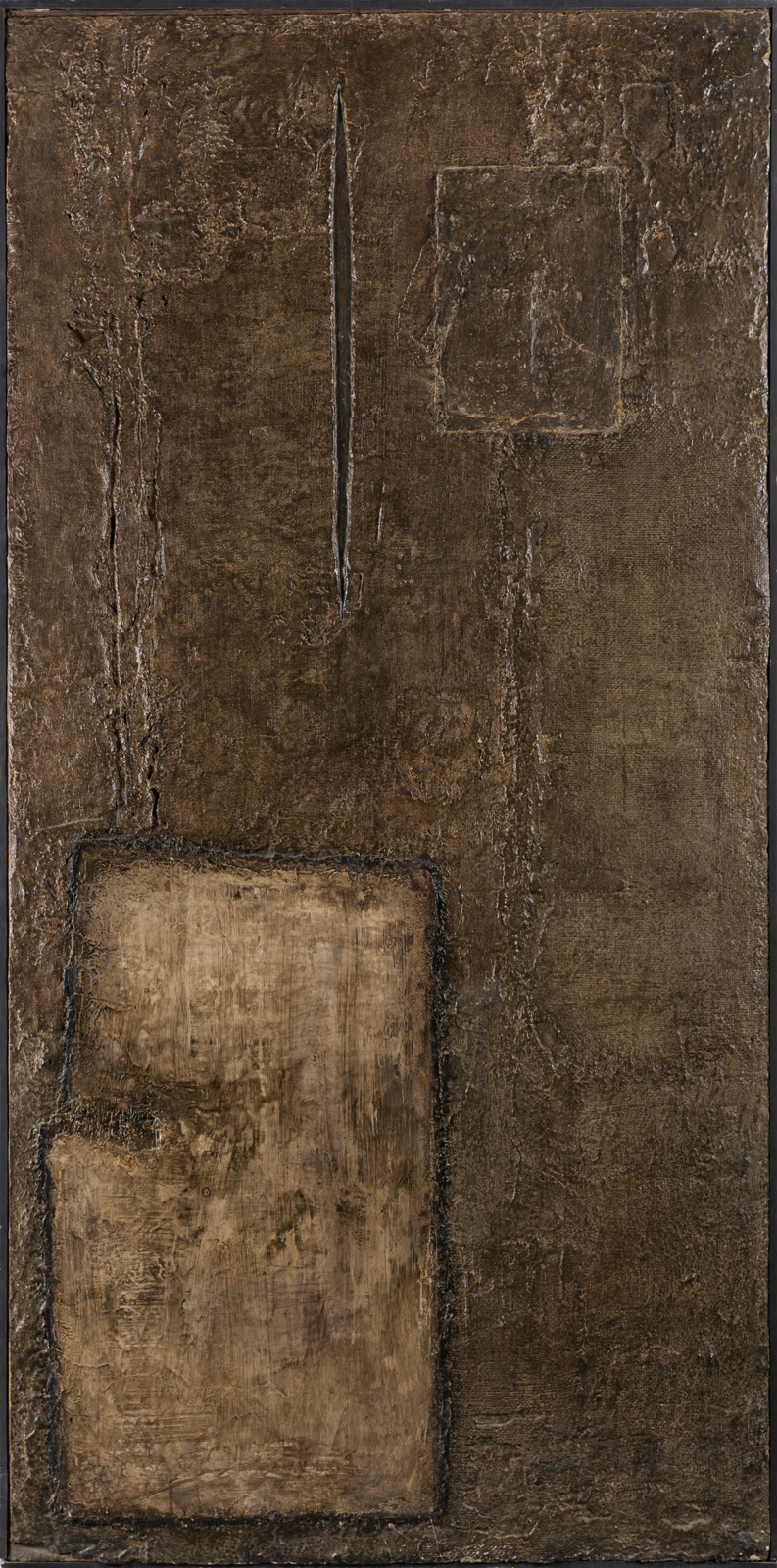
Jiří Valenta, Collage II (1960)

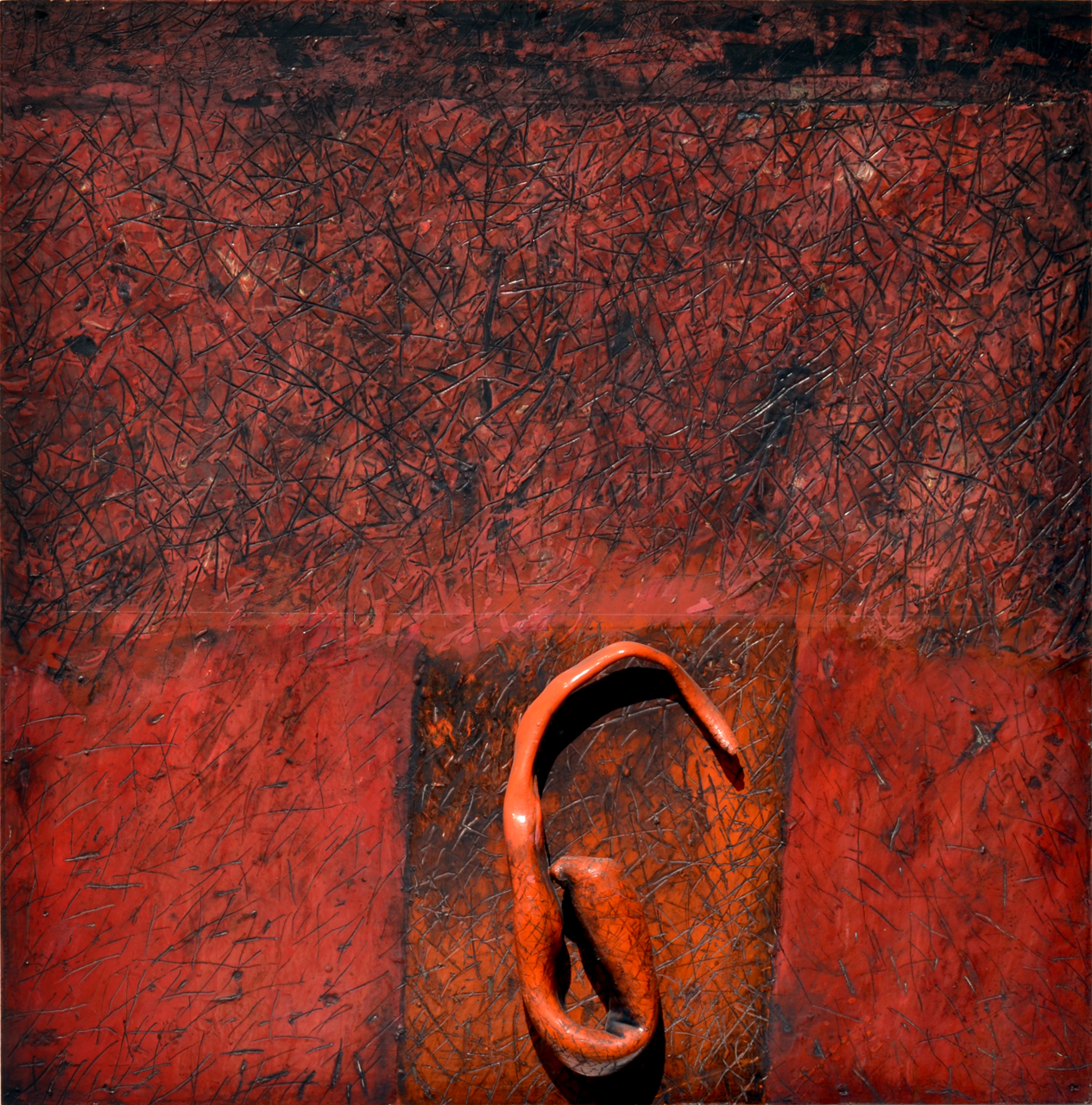
Jaroslav Vožniak, Untitled (1978), acrylic, resin, chipboard 100 x 100 cm

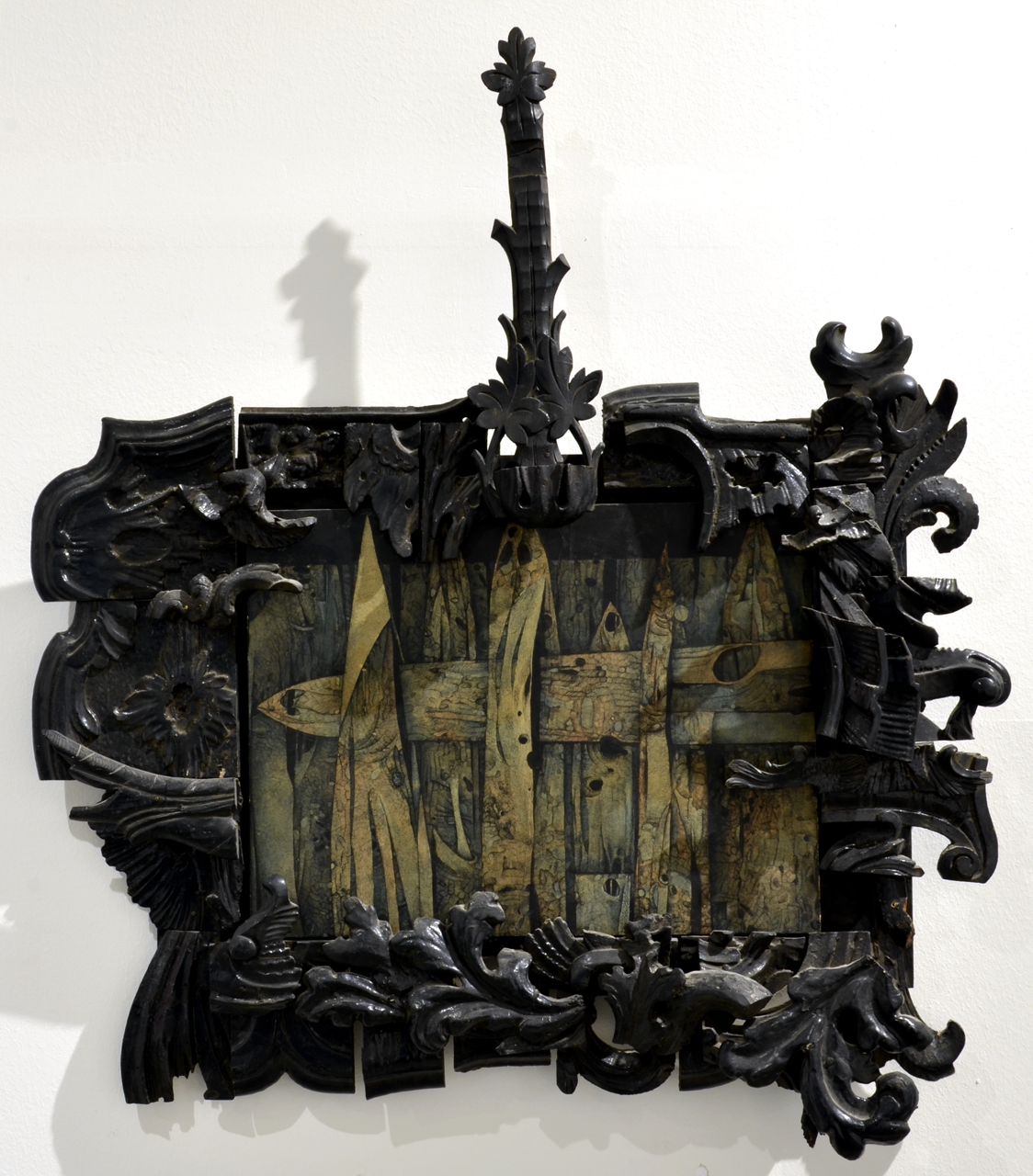
Jaroslav Vožniak, Knives (1963–1964)

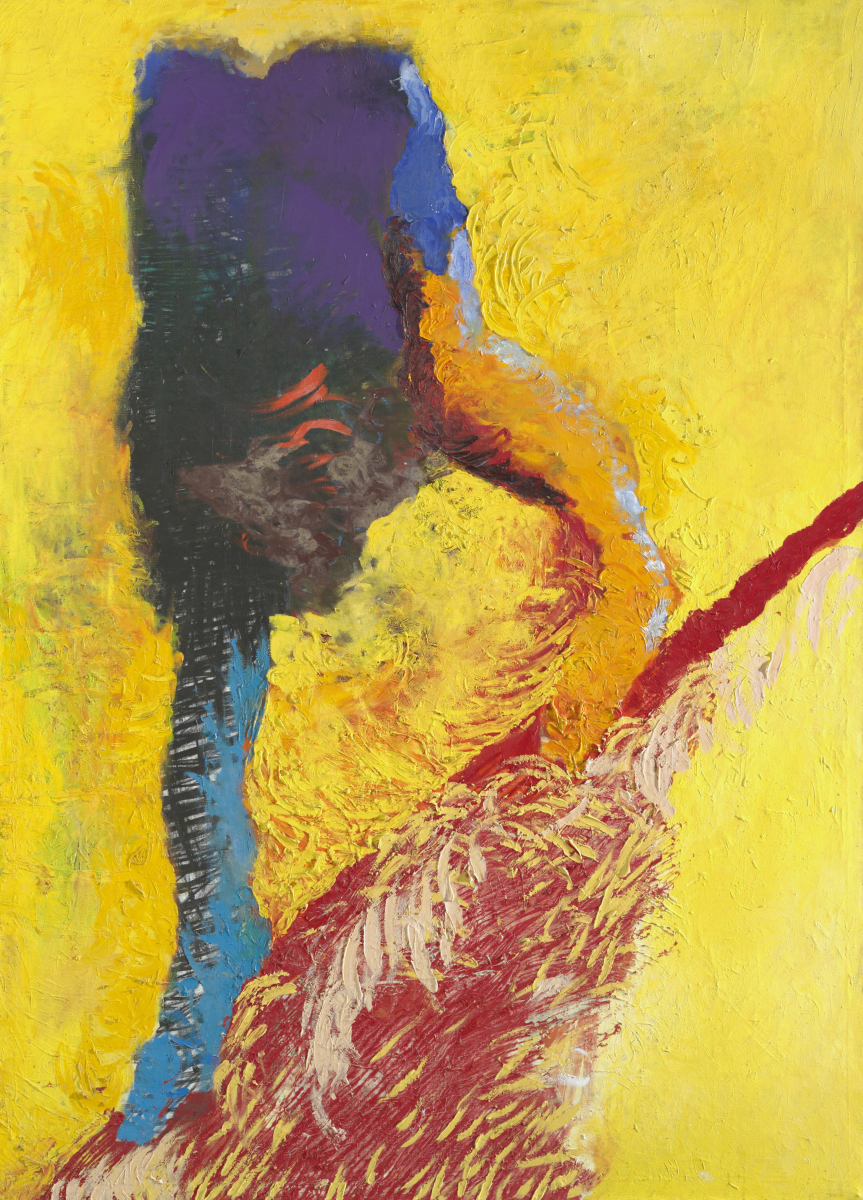
Otakar Slavík, Bent Rope Walker (1983–1987)

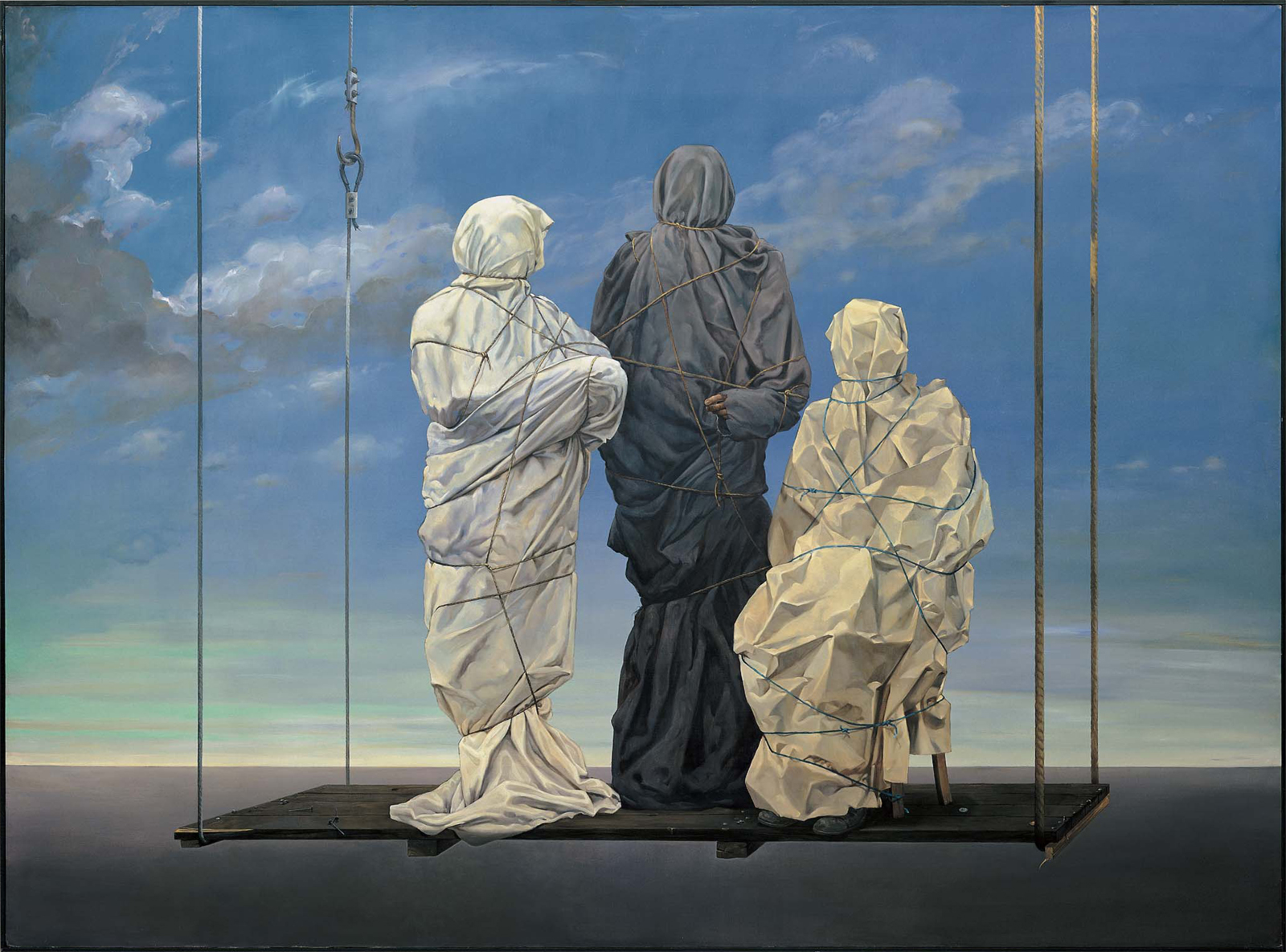
Theodor Pištěk, Family portrait (1976)

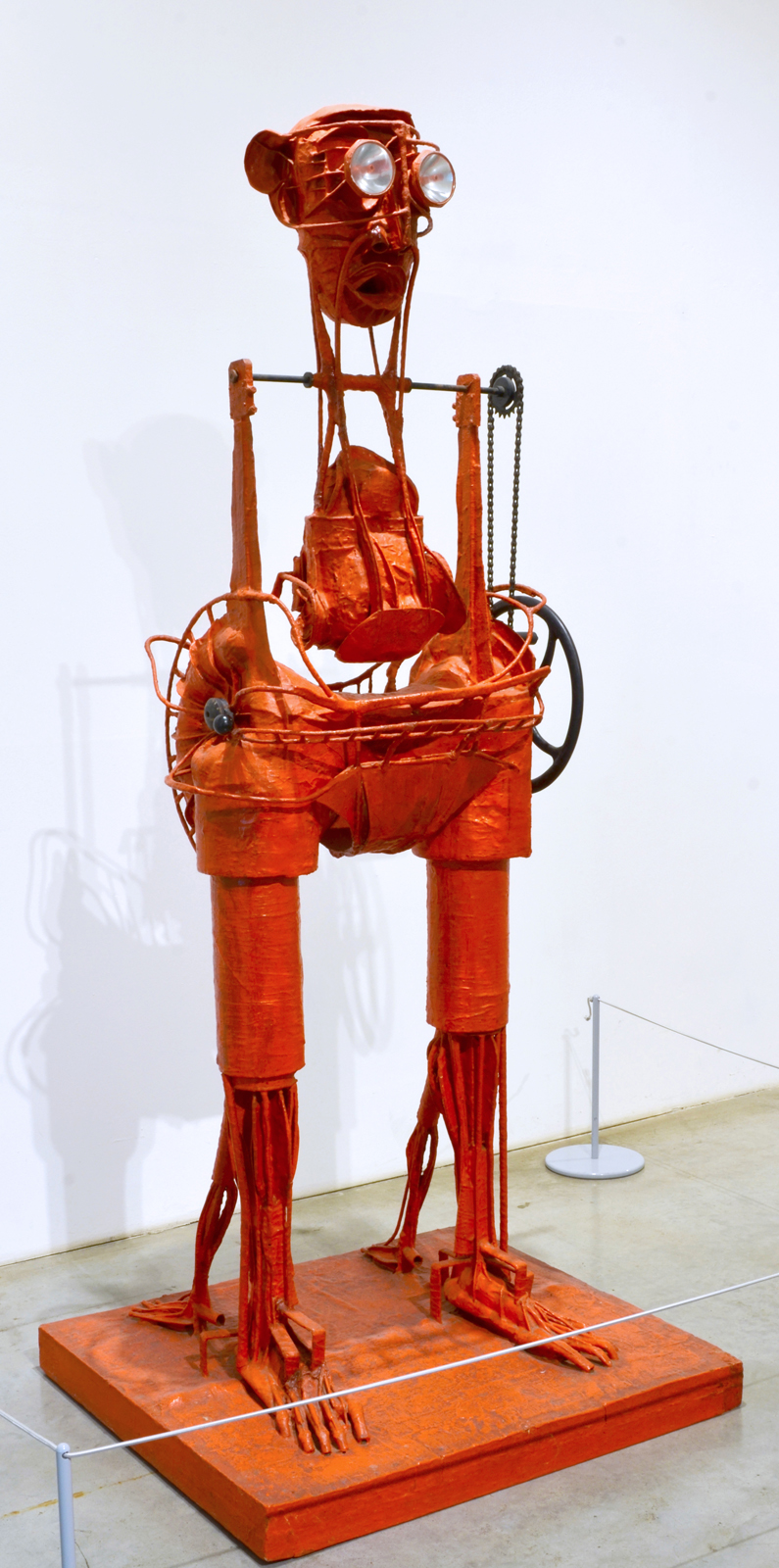
Karel Nepraš, Please turn (1967–1968)

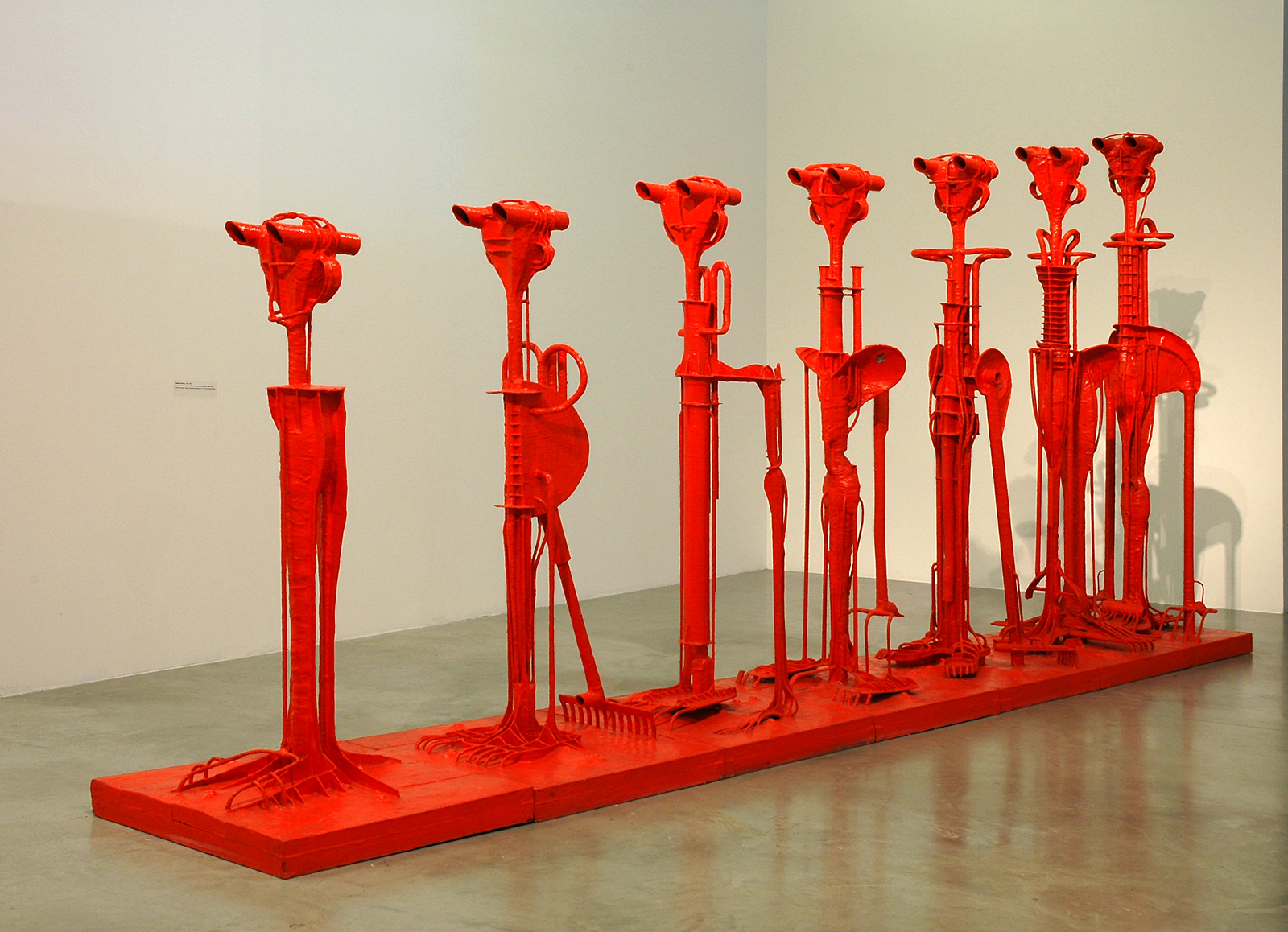
Karel Nepraš, Family (1967–1969)

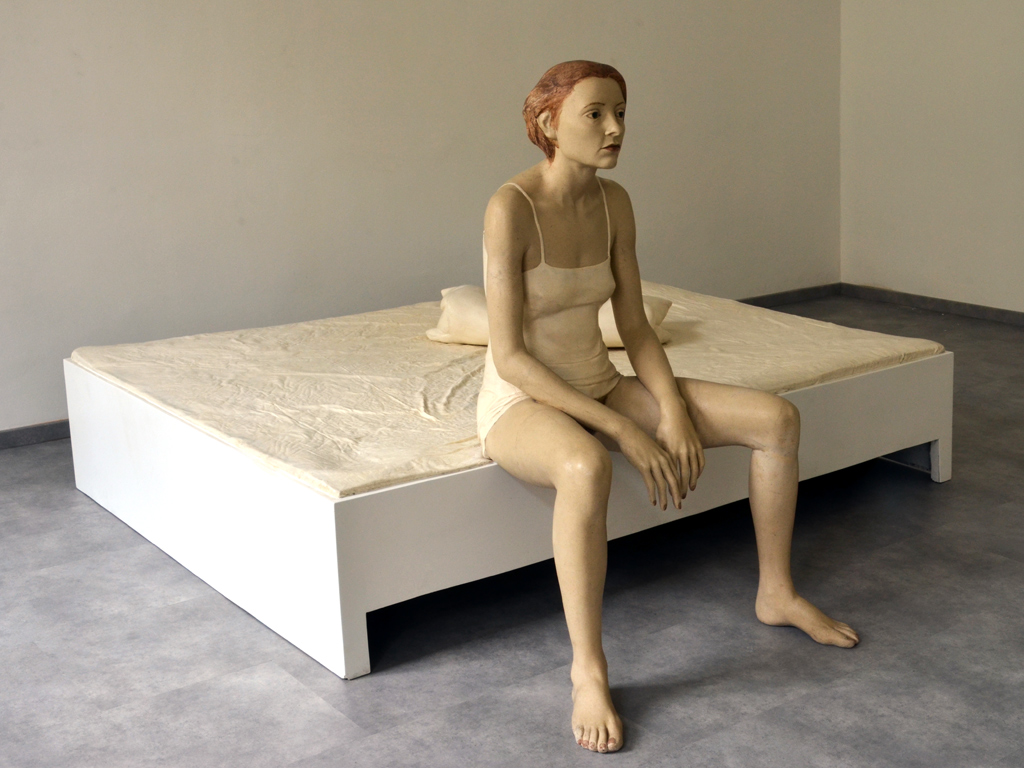
Ludmila Seefried-Matějková, At the Edge, polychrome polyester, wood, (1976-77)

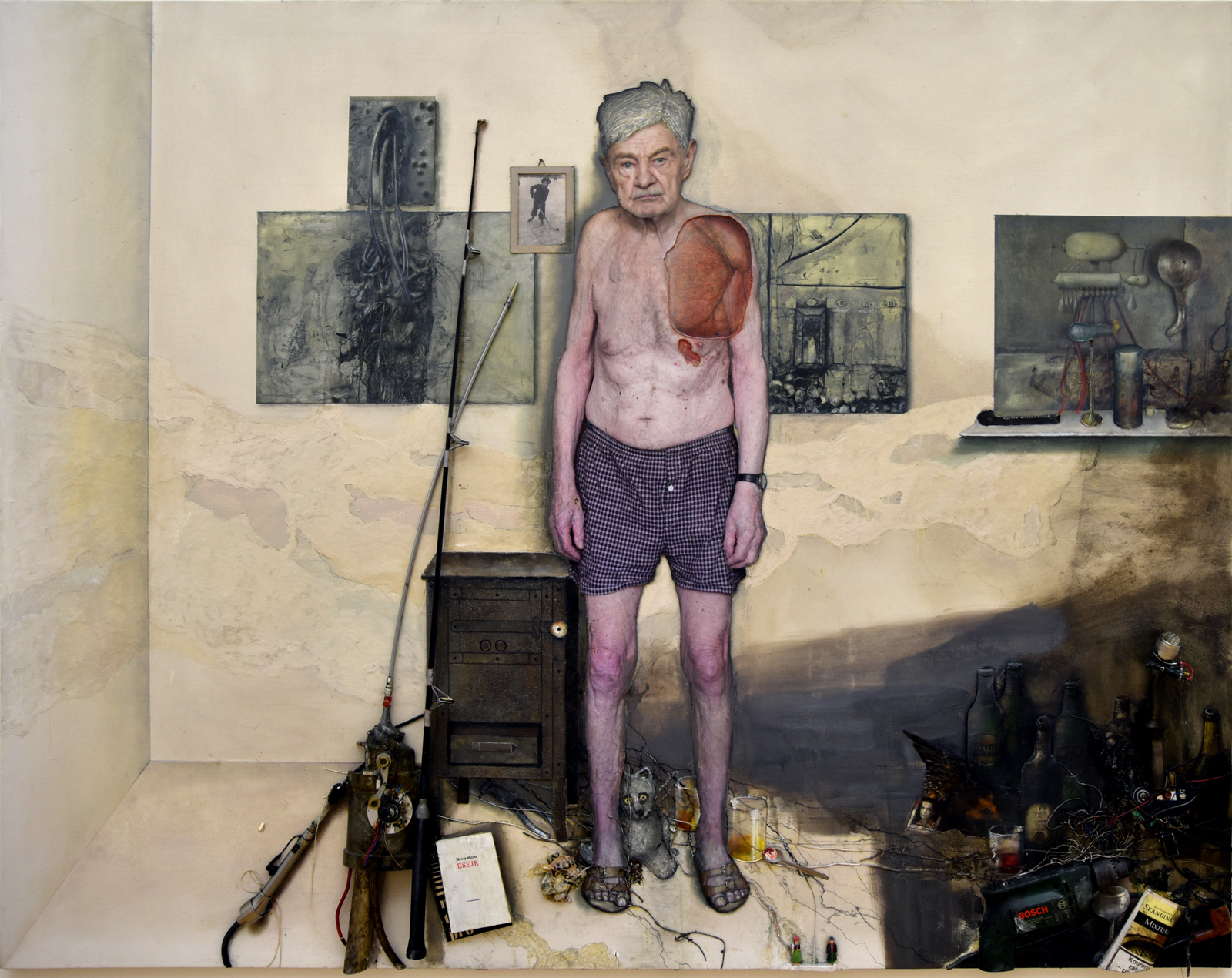
Bedřich Dlouhý, Academic painter B.D. reminisces (2019)

==== Collection of Czech Glass ====
Meda Mládková began collecting modern Czech glass after visiting the Museum of Decorative Arts in 1967, where she was captivated by an object by Václav Cigler hidden in the depository. During this stay in Prague, she visited studio of Václav Cigler and purchased one of his glass objects. Her collection of Czech glass grew rapidly and formed the basis of the exhibition "Czechoslovak Glass: Seven Masters" at the American Craft Museum in New York in 1983. During reconstructions of the Sova mills buildings, she asked Václav Cigler to incorporate modern elements into the future museum of art. He designed a glass bridge between the main building and the terrace on the ground floor exhibition hall with the Meeting point. Other glass elements were designed by Marian Karel and Dana Zámečníková.

The Kampa Museum's glass collection includes works by Václav Cigler, Marian Karel, Stanislav Libenský and Jaroslava Brychtová, René Roubíček, Dana Zámečníková, Věra Lišková and Vladimír Kopecký.

==== Collection of Central European Art ====
Meda Mládková's interest in art from across Central Europe was sparked by Milan Kundera. She was also influenced by her husband, Jan Viktor Mládek, who, as one of the executive directors of the International Monetary Fund, represented not only Czechoslovakia but also Poland and Yugoslavia. After meeting George Soros in exile, she founded a documentation center in Washington, D.C. and Budapest, whose members included the director of the Guggenheim Museum Thomas M. Messer, director of the Museum moderner Kunst Stiftung Ludwig Wien Dieter Ronte, and chief curator of the Tate Gallery. The work of Emilie Beneš Brzezinski, born in Geneva and later settled in the US, stands out somewhat from this collection. Meda Mládková often traveled to Poland, Hungary, and the countries of the former Yugoslavia, where she met with local artists who were unable to exhibit their work freely. She managed to acquire works by the following artists:

Poland - Magdalena Abakanowicz, Jerzy Bereś, Władysław Hasior, Józef Łukomski, Edward Dwurnik, Izabella Gustowska, Andrzej Bielawski, Hungary - András Baranyay, György Jovánovics, Croatia - Jagoda Buić, Stjepan Gračan, Ferdinand Kulmer, Ivan Lesiak, Branko Ružić, Đuro Seder Slovenia - Ivan Kožarić, Montenegro - Predrag Nešković, Serbia - Mića Popović

==== Collection of works by Jiří Kolář ====
The Kampa Museum houses a representative collection of works by Jiří Kolář from all phases of his career, comprising 250 items. The collection was created during the long-standing friendship between Meda Mládková and Jiří Kolář since the 1960s. In 1969, Meda Mládková organized an exhibition of Czechoslovak art in Washington. The works were purchased by her husband Jan Viktor Mládek for his office and for the International Monetary Fund. In 1975, the Solomon R. Guggenheim Museum in New York organized an exhibition of Jiří Kolář's works. The communist regime allowed the works to be exported on the condition that the museum would purchase them. When it became clear that the sale would not take place, Meda Mládková secretly purchased them through a Swiss lawyer for her collection. She acquired other works by Kolář in exchange for shipments of various goods that she sent to Prague or as gifts from the artist. In the 1990s, the collection was exhibited at the House of the Black Madonna and on loan at a retrospective exhibition of Jiří Kolář at the National Gallery in Prague.

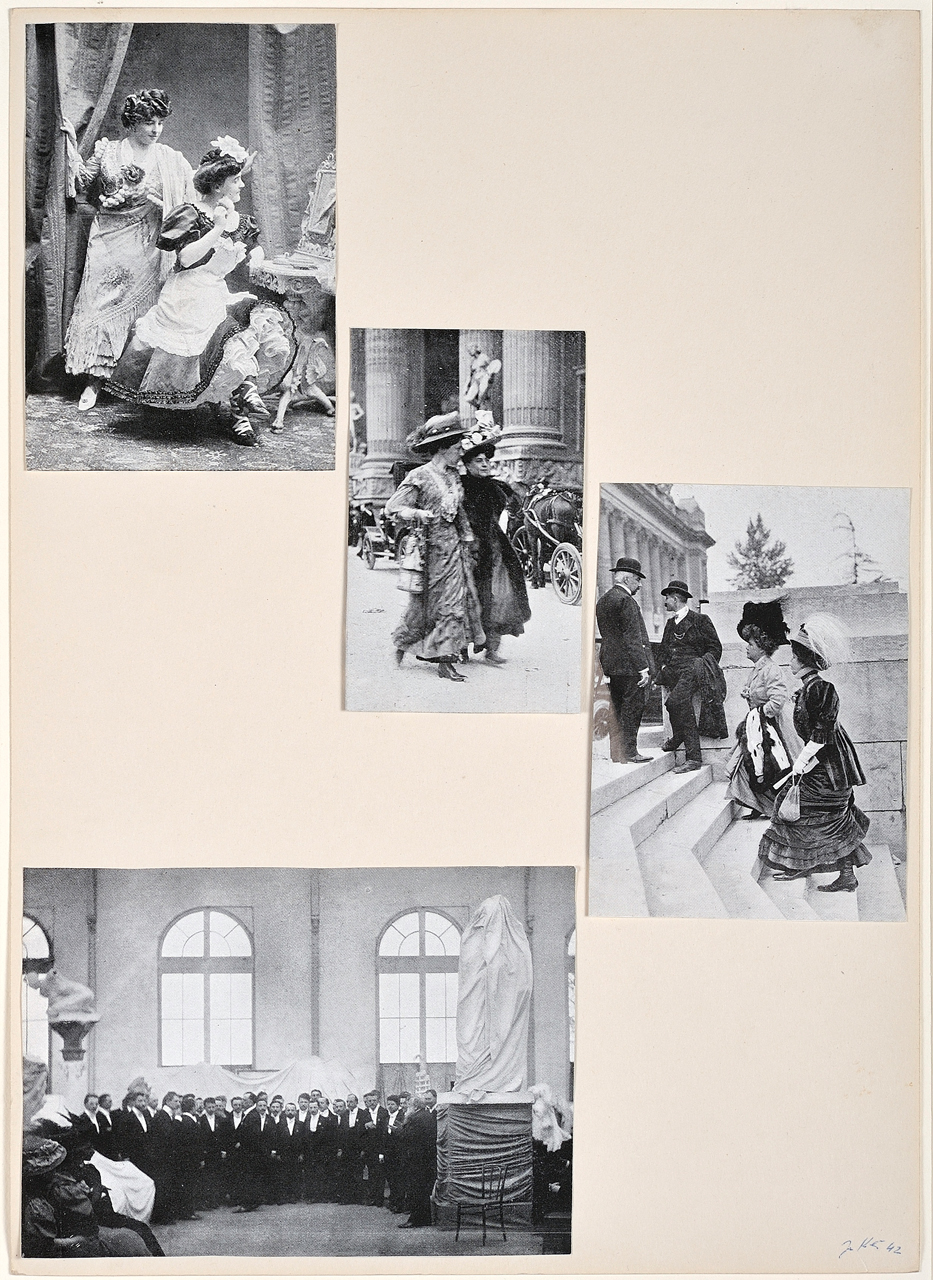
Jiří Kolář, Exhibition Opening (1942), reportage

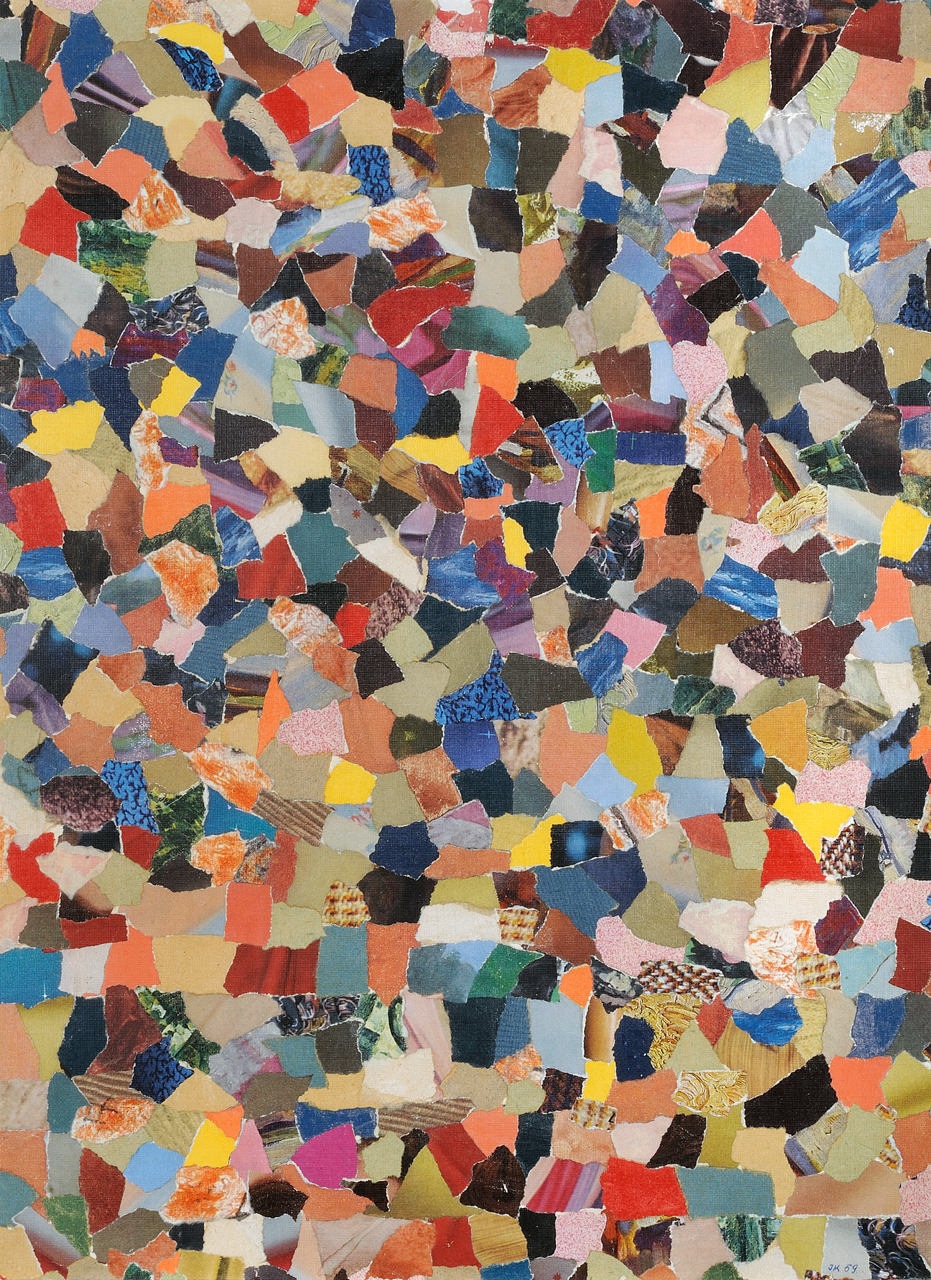
Jiří Kolář, In Full Sunlight (1959), collage

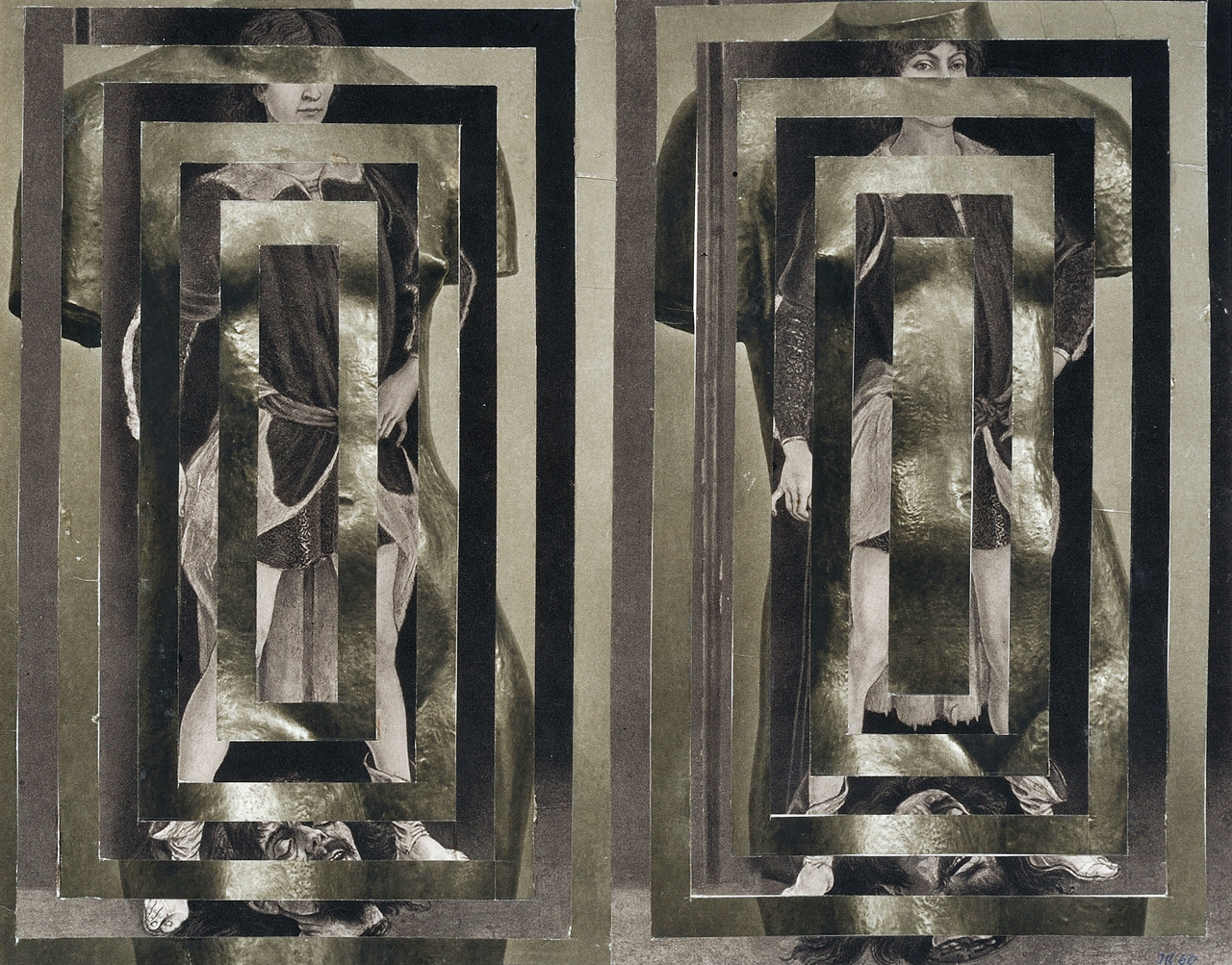
Jiří Kolář, David (1960), rollage

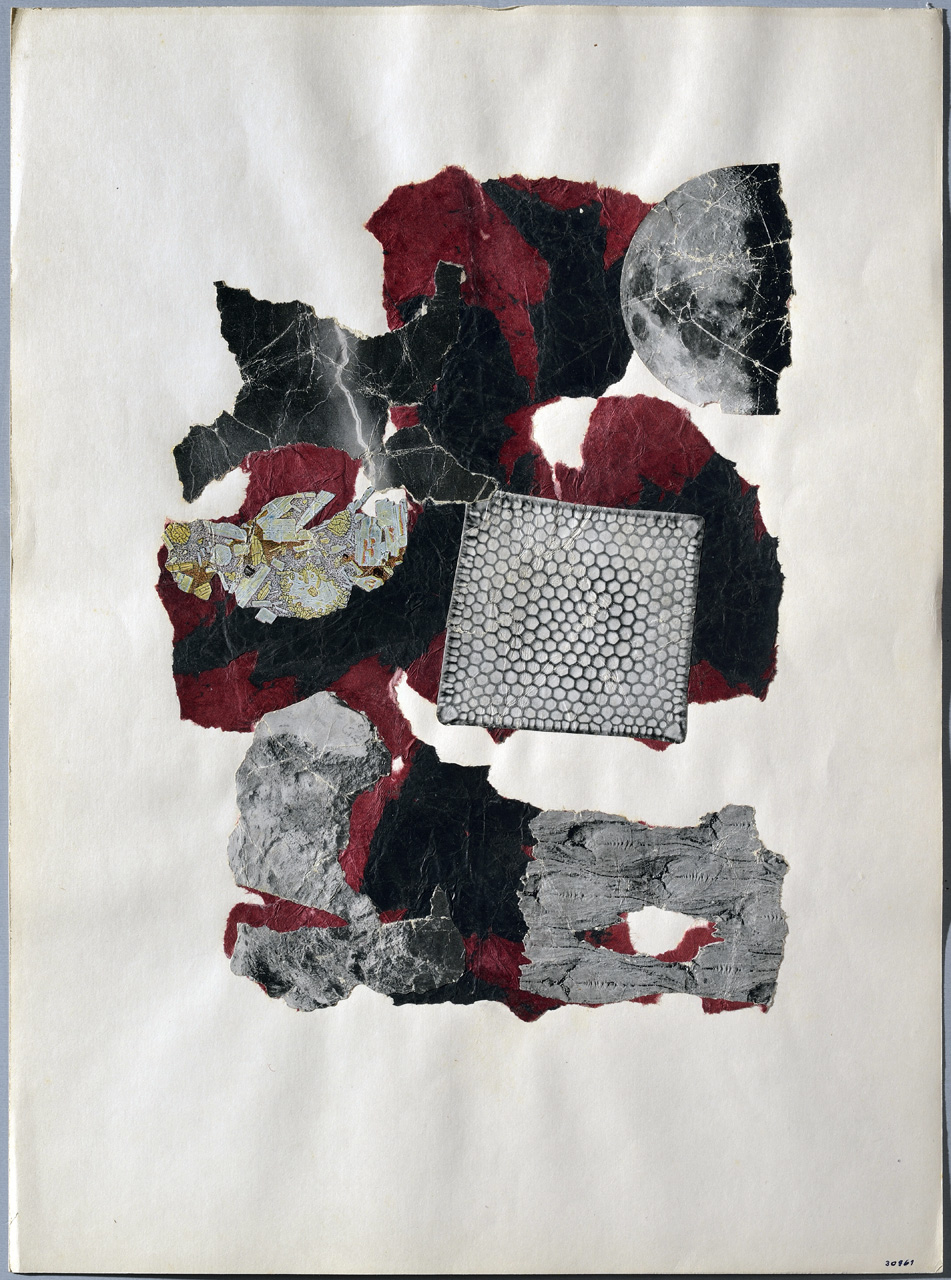
Jiří Kolář, What the Lightning Whistled (September 30, 1961), collage

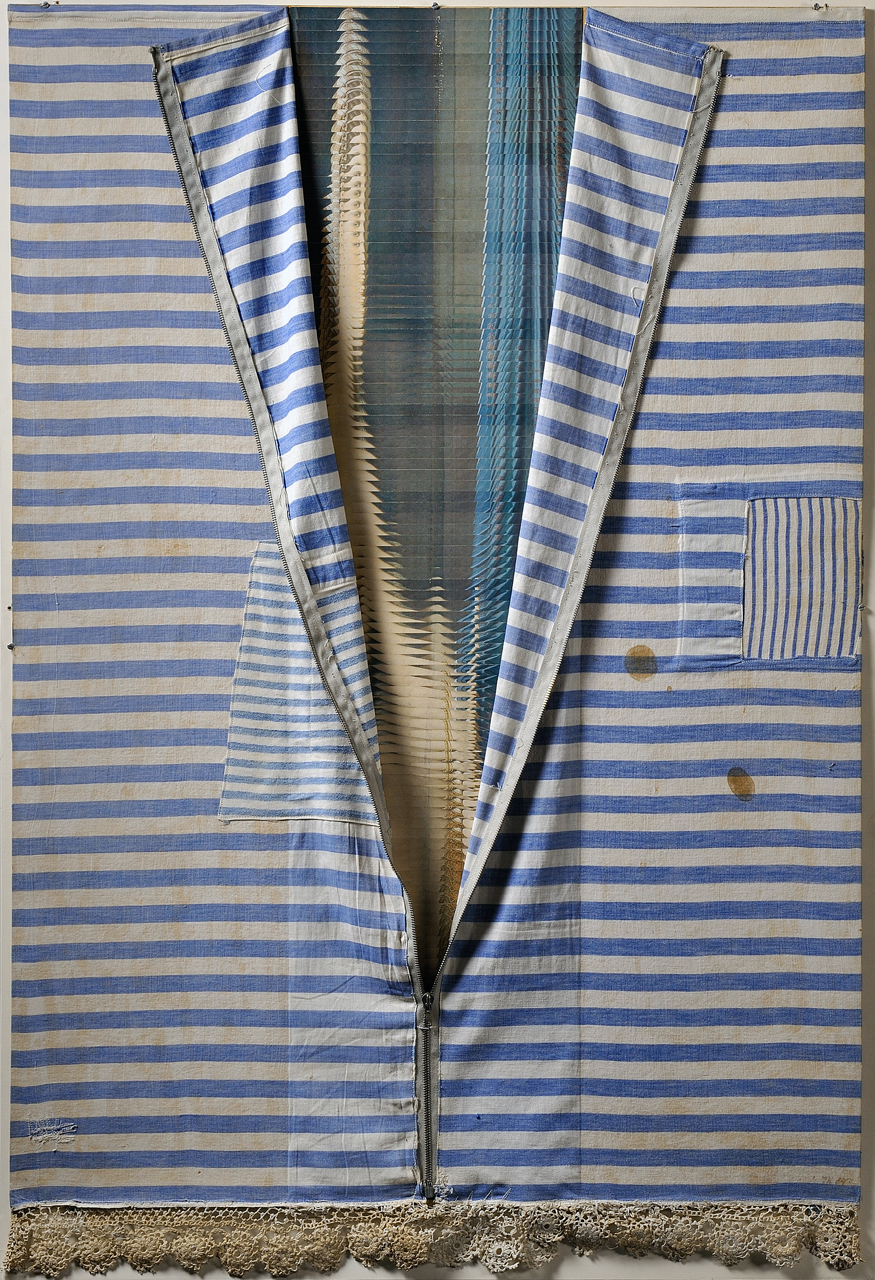
Jiří Kolář, Odalisque (1964), unzipping collage, rollage

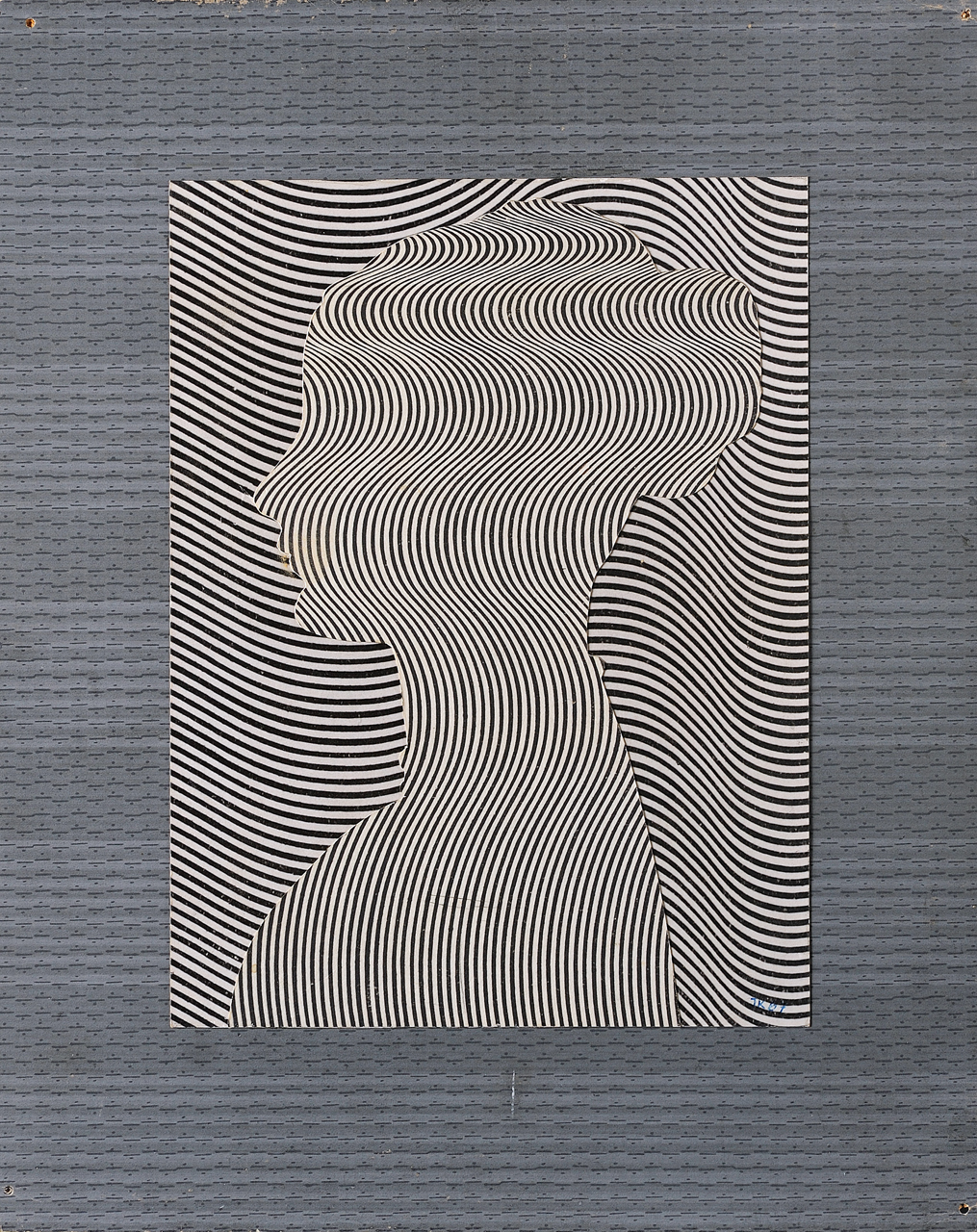
Jiří Kolář, Portrait - Bridget Riley (1967), prollage

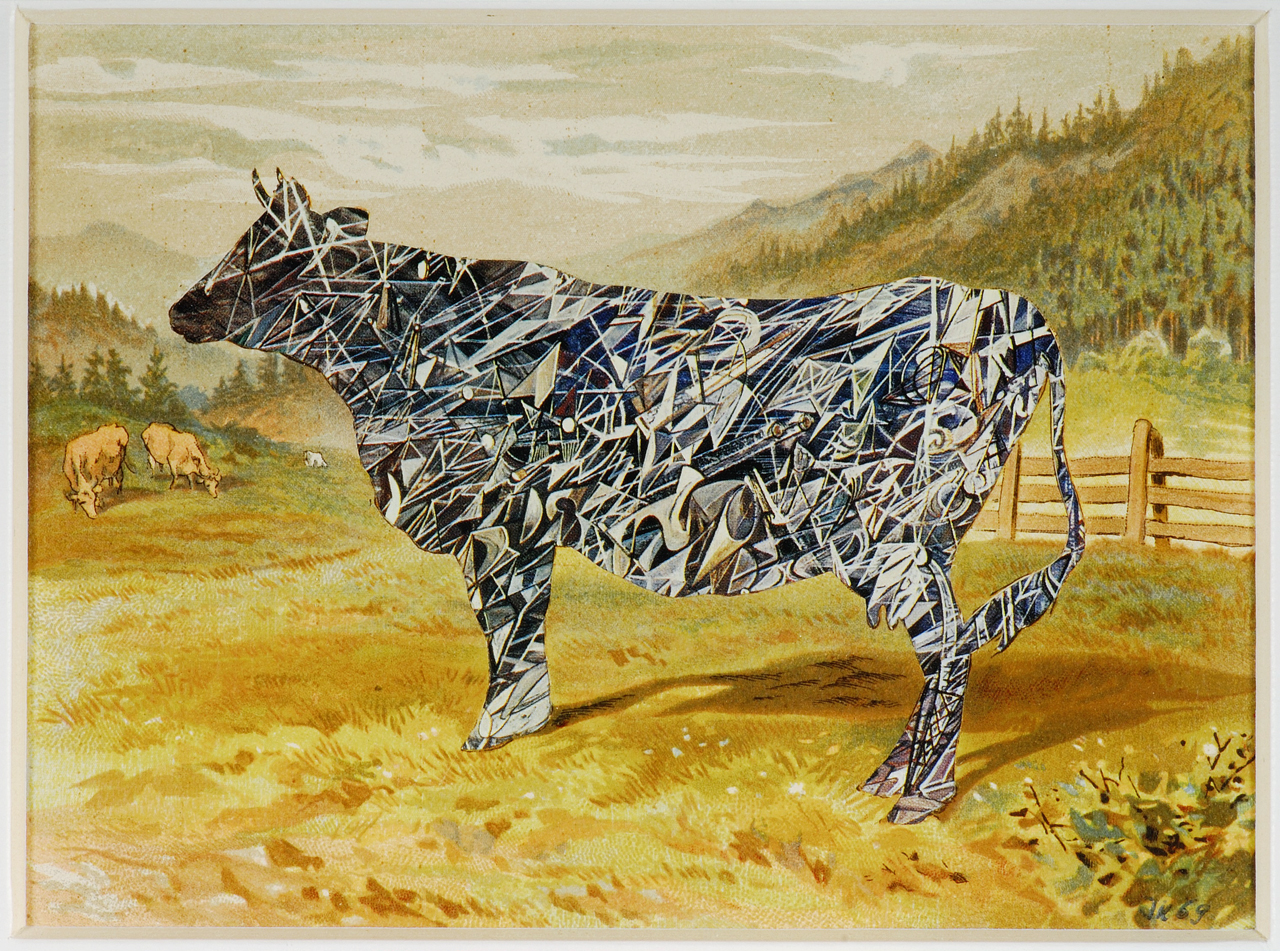
Jiří Kolář, Cow That Ate T (1969), intercollage

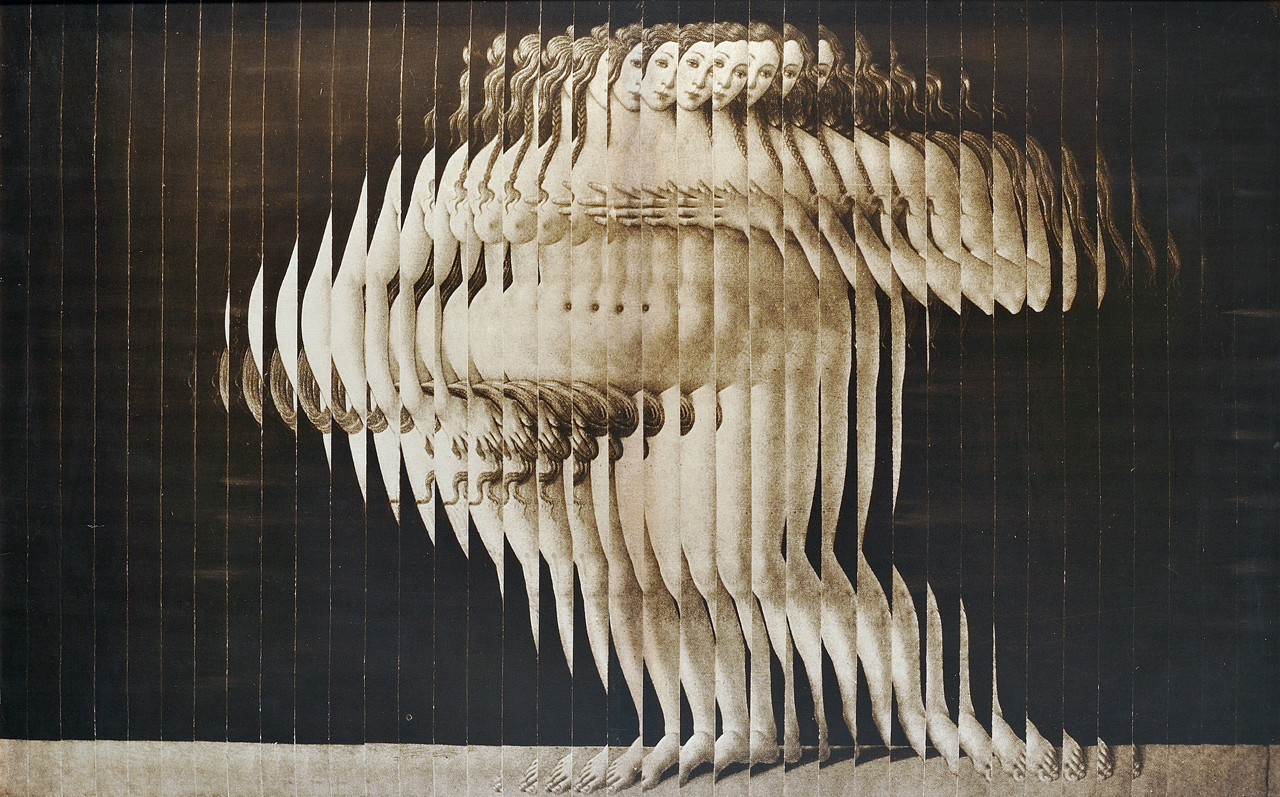
Jiří Kolář, Venus - Botticelli (1968–1969), rollage

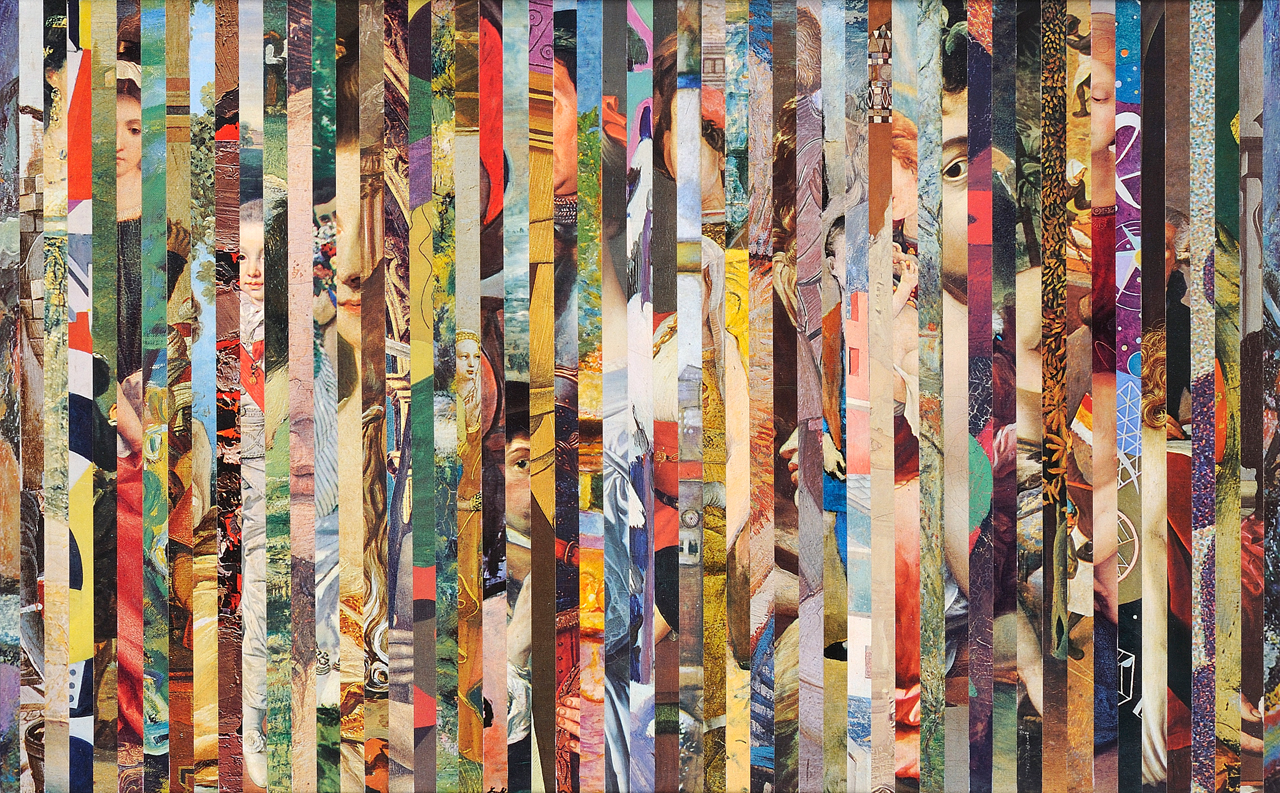
Jiří Kolář, Face of Memory (1971), rollage

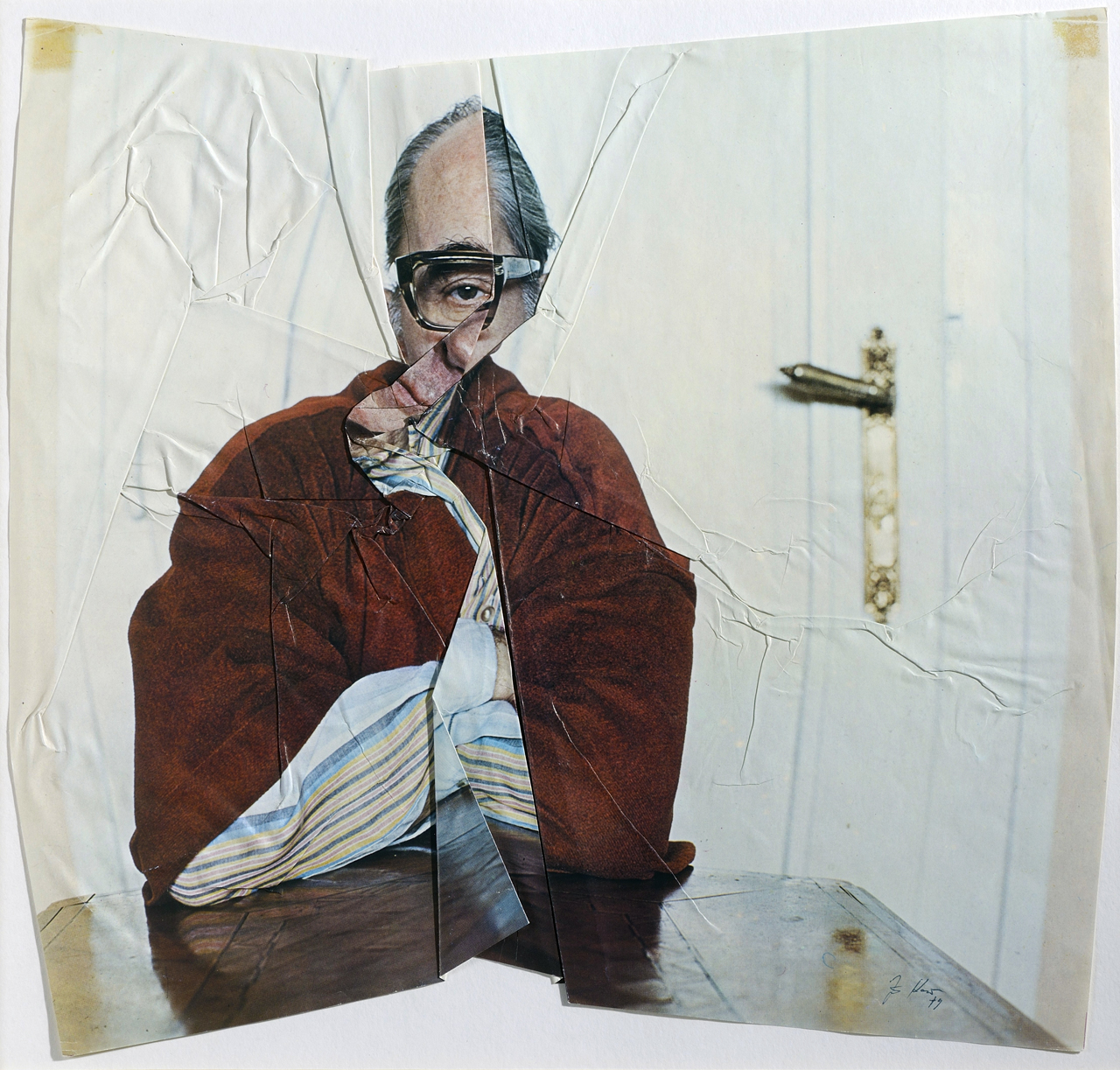
Jiří Kolář, Self-portrait (1971), crumplage

==== Jiří and Běla Kolář Collection ====
Jiří Kolář collected art while still in Prague, where he was a member of Group 42. From the 1940s, he supported several artists (Alén Diviš, Bohuslav Reynek, Josef Váchal) and, in the 1950s, writers (e.g., the publication of Bohumil Hrabal's first stories). He purchased works by artists who made their debut in the 1950s (Jan Koblasa, Bedřich Dlouhý, Vladimír Boudník) as well as the entire unofficial exhibition Confrontation from 1960. As an artist, he was world-renowned and financially independent from the mid-1960s onwards, building his own collection of world art. In 1968, he established his own "Jiří Kolář Prize", which he personally awarded (in 1976 to Eva Kmentová). He continued to build his collection as a political fugitive in Paris, where he lived from 1980. In Czechoslovakia, he was convicted of illegally leaving the republic and lost his property, and his Prague collection was confiscated. Thanks to Jiří Kotalík, part of the collection was transferred to the National Gallery in Prague, and later Jiří Kolář was allowed to buy back some of the works. After returning to Prague, Jiří Kolář generously legalized the confiscation of his work with a donation agreement and turned it into a patron's gift. Shortly before his death in 2002, he donated a large part of his collection to the Kampa Museum.

Significant works in Jiří Kolář's collection: graphic prints by P. Bruegel, L. Cranach, A. Dürer, V. Hollar, H. Daumier, works by classics of Czech modern art, including Josef Václav Myslbek, Luděk Marold, Josef Mařatka, and Alphonse Mucha, paintings by pre-war artists F. Kupka, F. Foltýn, collages by V. Preissig, drawings and prints by J. Čapek, works by B. Kubišta, F. Tichý, V. Tikal, V. Špála, A. Wachsmann, Toyen, J. Šíma, J. Štursa, and members of Group 42 founded during the war (J. Kotík, F. Gross, F. Hudeček, K. Lhoták, B. Matal, J. Smetana, M. Hák). Post-war art is represented in the collection by L. Novák, V. Burda, M. Dobeš, Č. Kafka, M. Grygar, J. Hampl, J. Hilmar, J. Koblasa, A. Málek, J. Valenta, J. Vožniak, K. Malich, V. Mirvald, F. Dvořák, P. Mautnerová, R. Piesen, S. Podhrázský, L. Fára, M. Medek, and from the later generation O. Hanel, R. Wittmannn, M. Moucha, V. Škoda, and others, as well as conceptualists M. Knížák, J. Mlčoch, and K. Miller. Foreign artist´s works include F. Morellet, G. Maciunas, and H. Hartung. Běla Kolářová is also represented. The collection was exhibited in 2001 at the National Gallery, and a comprehensive catalog was published. Later, a selection of works was presented at the Czech Center in Paris.

==== Collection for Jindřich Chalupecký ====
The collection was initiated by Meda Mládková during her visit to Prague in the fall of 1989. At that time, Jindřich Chalupecký was seriously ill, dependent on hemodialysis, and in urgent need of an artificial kidney. Meda Mládková decided to acquire works by artists whom Chalupecký had selflessly supported during normalization and sell them at auction in Paris with help of Jiří Kolář. The Czech PEN Club abroad took over the patronage, and some Czechs living in exile offered financial assistance. Meda Mládková asked the artists if she could select the works herself and secretly negotiated with Jiří Kotalík to store them in the depository of the National Gallery in Prague. After negotiations between František Janouch and the Swedish company Gambro, the device was finally purchased by the Charter 77 Foundation. Meda Mládková then pledged that all the works would remain in Prague and become part of the Czech Foundation for Central and Eastern European Art, which she established for this purpose. In the meantime, the communist regime fell, some works were exchanged, and the collection was enriched with large formats. The donations were used to organize an exhibition entitled "Tribute to Jindřich Chalupecký" (January 16–28, 1990) at the Prague Municipal Library. After the exhibition ended, the collection was loaned to President Václav Havel to decorate offices in the Prague Castle.

In 1990, on the initiative of Jiří Kolář, Václav Havel and Theodor Pištěk, the Jindřich Chalupecký Award was established in memory of the prominent art critique, who died in June 1990. Between 1990 and 2023, the Jindřich Chalupecký Award was intended for artists under the age of 35. The first winner was Vladimír Kokolia in 1990.

In 1994, an advisory board consisting of Karel Schwarzenberg, František Janouch, Jiří Šetlík and Meda Mládková decided that the Jindřich Chalupecký collection would become part of the Kampa Museum's art collection, where it would complement the collection of Czech art that Meda Mládková had purchased over the years, partly on the recommendation of Jindřich Chalupecký.

New additions to the collection include M. Balcar, Z. Beran, V. Bláha, O. Čechová, S. Diviš, D. Fischer, J. Jíra, I. Kafka, O. Karlíková, J. Kovanda, K. Kovařík, P. Nešleha, V. Novák, P. Oriešková, Z. Palcr, K. Pauzer, J. Pištěk, V. Pivovarov, M. Ressel, M. Rittstein, F. Ronovský, T. Rossi, V. Sedláková, J. Severová, J. Smetana, L. Sorokáč, O. Tichý, L. Vilhelmová, P. Župník.

==== Grit Wendelberger Collection ====
Grit Wendelberger is an art historian and artist who studied at Masaryk University in Brno and worked at the Dresden branch of Berlin gallery Bassenge. In the 1980s, she visited Czech artists and collected drawings and prints by V. Boštík, J. Hůla, A. Lamr, D. Chatrný, J.H. Kocman, V. Sedláková, and J. Steklík, as well as art prints published as posters by Galerie H. In 2007, the collection was purchased by Meda Mládková, who thus acquired a large collection of etchings and pastels by Václav Boštík.

=== Gift to the City of Prague ===
In exchange for renovating the building and leasing it free of charge, the City of Prague received a total of 215 paintings and drawings by František Kupka, 240 collages and objects by Jiří Kolář, and 279 art artifacts by Czech and Slovak artists from 1965 to 1985. The total value of the donation at the time was CZK 600 million.

== Jan and Meda Mládek Foundation ==
=== Founder ===
- Meda Mládková

=== Director ===
- Mgr. Jan Smetana

=== Foundation Activities ===
The foundation manages two buildings

- Museum Kampa with a gallery of modern art in the Sovovy mlýny building
- Werich vila with a permanent exhibition on the actor Jan Werich

== Sources ==
- J. Machalický, J. Lammer (eds.), Sbírky Musea Kampa / Collections of the Kampa Museum, 600 pp., published by Museum Kampa-Jan and Meda Mládek Foundation, Prague 2009, ISBN 978-80-254-3773-5
- Jiří Soukup, Pražské jezy, mlýny, vodárny a nábřeží / Prague weirs, mills, waterworks, and embankments. Prague: Weinfurter, 1905 (pp.30-32, Mlýny Sovovy on line)
