= Gallery of the Central Bohemian Region =

- Galerie Středočeského kraje
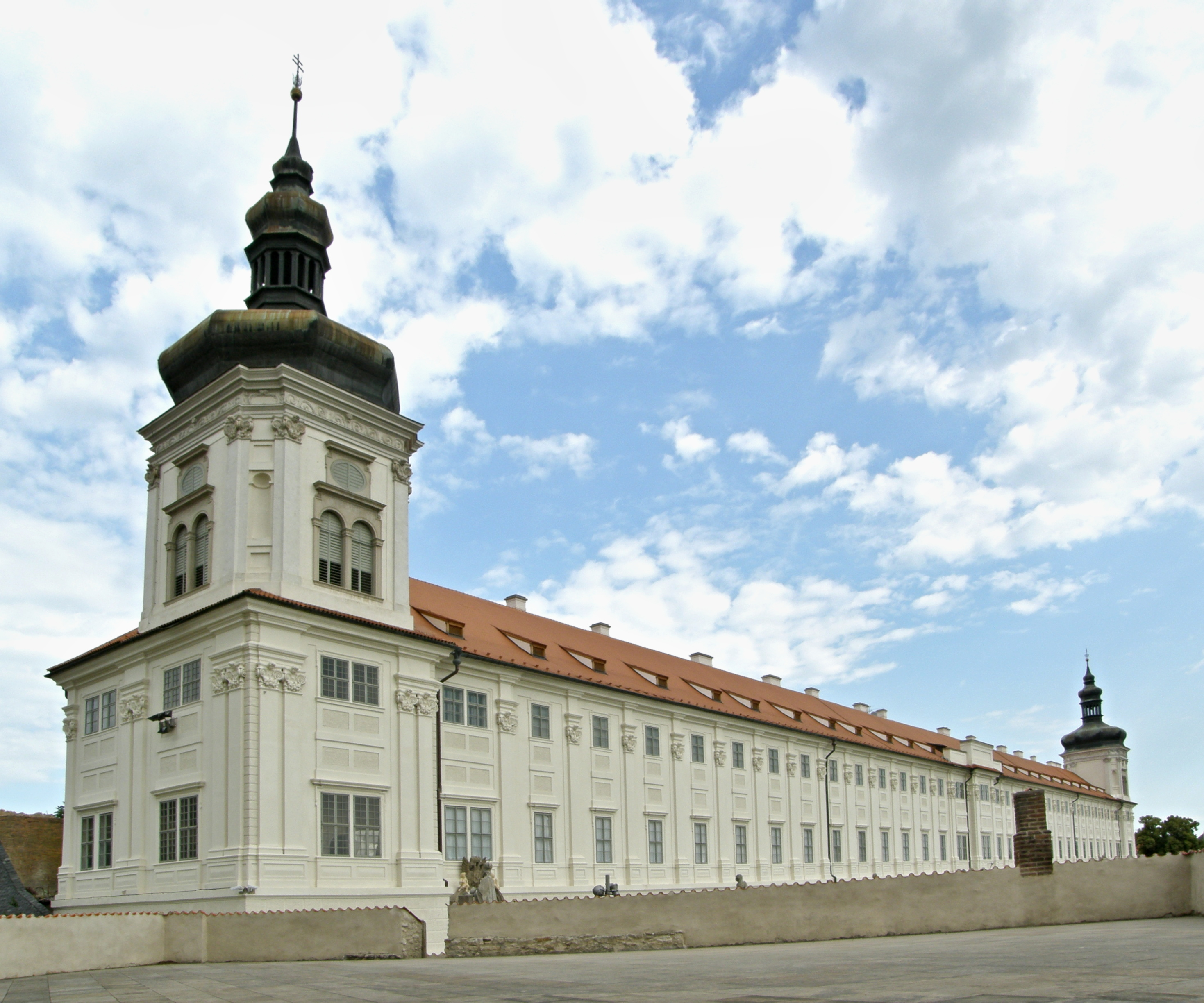
- Former Jesuit College
- Established: 1963, as Central Bohemian Gallery in Prague, since 1993 as Czech Museum of Fine Arts in Prague
- Location: Former Jesuit College in Kutná Hora (since 2010)
- Coordinates: 49.9462°N 15.2640°E
- Key holdings: Modern art since the 19th century
- Director: Jana Šorfová
- Owner: Central Bohemian Region
- Website: gask.cz

Gallery of the Central Bohemian Region (Czech: Galerie Středočeského kraje, abbreviated GASK) is an art gallery in Kutná Hora in the Czech Republic. It is located in a renovated Baroque building that used to be a Jesuit College. GASK is the successor to the Czech Museum of Fine Arts in Prague. It cares for nearly 10,000 collection items (paintings, drawings, prints, sculptures, photographs and works of so-called new media). Gallery collections include about 3,000 paintings, 600 sculptures, 2,000 drawings, and 3,000 prints. Since 2009, it has been a subsidized organization of the Central Bohemian Region.

The Central Bohemian Gallery was established in 1964 as a spin-off from the Centre for State Heritage Preservation and Nature Protection of the Central Bohemian Region (SSPPOPSK) and until 1971 had a permanent exhibition at the Nelahozeves Castle. Since its foundation, it has focused primarily on 20th and 21st century fine arts. From 1971 to 2009, it was housed in three renovated medieval houses at Husova street 19–21, Prague 1. From 1993, it operated under the new name Czech Museum of Fine Arts in Prague in order to distance itself from the period of normalization, which meant an interruption in its development and the ideological destruction of its original concept. At that time, the gallery did not have suitable premises for presenting its collections and exhibited, among other places, at Karolinum and House of the Black Madonna. In 1998, it acquired the Jesuit College in Kutná Hora as its future location, and in 2001, its administration was transferred from the Ministry of Culture back to the Central Bohemian Region. After moving to Kutná Hora, it changed its name to the Gallery of the Central Bohemian Region (GASK).

== History of the gallery ==
Post-war restoration of regions in Czechoslovakia from 1 January 1949 enabled the creation of a system of regional galleries. At that time, the Prague Region included the capital city of Prague and the Central Bohemian Region, and according to a ministerial directive from 1952, the relevant gallery was the National Gallery Prague. The Central Bohemian Region was thus the only region without its own gallery institution. This could only be established after the reorganization of the state administration in 1960, when the separate Central Bohemian Region was established.

=== 1960–1971 ===
The oldest part of the collection was purchased between 1960 and 1963 by the Central Bohemian Heritage Preservation Centre, which had set up a working group to prepare the establishment of a future gallery. The secretary of the purchasing commission at that time was historian Miloš Suchomel, and art historian Miroslav Lamač (chairman of the commission from 1961 to 1962) was a member of the commission on behalf of the Union of Czechoslovak Artists. Both were instrumental in purchasing works by important pre-war modernist artists, especially Osma art group (Emil Filla, Bohumil Kubišta and others), Tvrdošíjní (Josef Čapek, Václav Špála, Jan Zrzavý and others), the Group 42, and the Surrealists. Miloš Suchomel also promoted the purchase of old art and, together with his colleague Olga Preisnerová, visited the studios of artists whom the communist regime considered undesirable. He thus had a lasting influence on the character of the collection and, despite the Communist party guidelines in force in the 1950s and the opinions of regime officials on the commission, whose task was to oversee the ideological correctness of art, he pushed through the purchase of some works of modern art. By 1963, the composition of the purchasing commission had changed and it was possible to purchase works by some of the most important young artists of 1960s. In 1963, the collection was expanded to include a relatively high-quality set of works that had been discarded from the National Gallery's collections on the orders of the Ministry of Culture as inferior or politically problematic.

In 1963, Miloš Suchomel and his colleagues prepared several exhibition projects in cultural centres, and at his initiative, the Central Bohemian Regional Committee separated the Central Bohemian Gallery from the SSPPOPSK in December 1963 as an independent fiscal organization Its collections were originally supposed to be installed at Konopiště or at the castles in Mělník or Lysá nad Labem. The decision to place the exhibition at the Nelahozeves Castle was made just before the gallery was founded at the end of 1963. The castle was transferred to the administration of the Central Bohemian Gallery in 1967 in a state of disrepair and was continuously renovated until 1992. It served as a depository, and the gradually expanded exhibition spaces made it possible to display virtually all newly acquired works. Until 1971, the gallery's administrative headquarters were located in the building of the Central Bohemian KNV in Prague.

Miloš Suchomel was appointed director in January 1964 and presented his concept for a planned exhibition of modern art in Nelahozeves at the first meeting of the purchasing committee in May 1964. Due to the planned exhibition of Robert Piesen, whose paintings seemed "too abstract and incomprehensible" to the censorship authority and then to the approving Department of Education and Culture, Miloš Suchomel was dismissed in July of the same year after seven months in office and the exhibition was canceled.

Jiří Kohoutek worked at the Central Bohemian Gallery from 1963 as a specialist in the SSPPOPSK gallery group and curator of the first exhibitions (Otto Gutfreund, Jaroslav Vožniak). He was appointed director after Miloš Suchomel and became the author of the first permanent exhibition of Czech modern art, opened in 1964 at the castle in Nelahozeves. During Jiří Kohoutek's tenure, the Central Bohemian Gallery intensively built up its collection of Czech modern art between 1964 and 1971, which complemented the exhibition. The director's expert advisor was art historian Antonín Hartmann, who knew many of the artists personally. From 1964 to 1966, Jindřich Chalupecký was the chairman of the purchasing committee, and in the 1960s, Josef Hlaváček, Jaromír Zemina and Zdeněk Palcr were also members of the committee. Thanks to a more favorable political atmosphere, relative freedom of choice, and a solid financial foundation, over 1,500 works of art were purchased between 1964 and 1967. The purchasing committee met twice a year and even pushed through works by artists that the previous committee had not recommended. The core of the collection consisted of high-quality works of surrealist and imaginative art purchased in the 1960s from private collections. Until 1966, when the National Gallery reinstalled its modern collections, this exhibition was the largest presentation of Czech post-war art. Director Jiří Kohoutek had to face constant political pressure from Regional National Council officials, who in 1966, after inspecting the exhibition of the Central Bohemian Gallery's modern art collection, proposed his dismissal.

According to a resolution of the Communist party's Ideological Commission in 1965, the Central Bohemian Gallery's collection was to be divided into several specialized exhibitions at Křivoklát Castle (medieval art), Mělník Castle (Renaissance and Baroque art), and Nelahozeves Castle (modern art). During the 1960s, permanent exhibition spaces were also established under the administration of the Central Bohemian Gallery in Mladá Boleslav, Kolín, Kladno, and Příbram, and memorial exhibitions were created for Zdenek Rykr and Rudolf Kremlička in Kolín, Václav Rabas in Rakovník and Georges Kars in Velvary. In 1969, the Central Bohemian Gallery's modern art exhibition occupied two floors of the castle in Nelahozeves and, together with the installation in the South Bohemian Gallery in Hluboká nad Vltavou, became the largest regional gallery of 20th-century Czechoslovak art. The castle was not equipped for year-round operation, and the exhibition was only open from May to October.

The Lidice Collection, which was created from donations by foreign artists and transferred to the Central Bohemian Gallery in 1967, was also temporarily stored in Nelahozeves. At the end of the 1960s, it comprised 350 works, including donations from Gerhard Richter, Joseph Beuys, and Sigmar Polke. A separate building was to be constructed for it directly in Lidice. An architectural competition, announced in 1968, selected the project by architect Vladimír Langer, but the construction of the gallery was ultimately halted in 1970, and the collection was temporarily exhibited in Nelahozeves. In 2003, the collection was returned to Lidice. In 2002–2003, the cultural centre in Lidice was adapted for the Lidice Collection.

For its administrative headquarters and new exhibition spaces, the Central Bohemian Gallery purchased and, since 1969, renovated three medieval houses on Husova Street in Prague.

=== 1970–1989 ===
After the soviet occupation in August 1968, a harsh period of normalization began. In 1970 the new purchasing commission refused to approve the purchase of certain works. Delegates to the 14th Congress of the Communist Party of Czechoslovakia in 1971 agreed that the gallery's conceptual focus on 20th-century art was inappropriate. Director Jiří Kohoutek, who refused to comply with the party directive and reevaluate the exhibition from "new ideological and political perspectives" (works by artists who emigrated after the occupation remained on display), was dismissed on 1 December 1971, prior to the opening of the newly renovated headquarters of the Central Bohemian Gallery on Husova Street in Prague. In his place, the already "consolidated" Union of Artists appointed the painter Vladimír Brehovszký as director and, as his deputy, Jiří M. Boháč. Both rejected the previous concept of the gallery, reinstalled the exhibition in Nelahozeves, and, with the aim of "completing the profile of the socialist man," reevaluated the history of Czech art in favor of realistic tendencies. In the modern art exhibition, a special section was reserved for "artworks reflecting human drama, the fight against fascism, neocolonialism, and anti-humanism."

The purchasing committee continued to favor consistent realism, regional artists, and strong social engagement on the part of creators—most of whom were members of the Communist party. Just one month after taking office, Brehovszký made an extraordinary purchase worth 180,660 Czechoslovak crowns, including landscapes by Eduard Stavinoha, "The Wounded" by Arnošt Paderlík, "Victorious Youth" and "Red Army Soldiers" by Antonín Kalvoda, "Woman from the Market" and "Partisan" by Rudolf Svoboda, and portrait sculptures by Miroslav Pangrác. Support for socially engaged art had concrete results in the exhibition projects "Lidice 1942–1972" at Mánes (1972), "Contemporary Realistic Tendencies in the Visual Arts of Central Bohemia" (1973) and "Greeting from the Central Bohemian Gallery to Soviet Airmen" (Milovice, 1975). During Brehovszký's tenure, the "Lidice Collection" was exhibited in Nelahozeves, which, after the exhibition in Mánes and the "annual art project on the theme of Lidice" (1974), was supplemented with selected works by Czech pro-regime artists.

After Brehovszky's death, painter Josef Schlesinger was appointed to replace him in 1976. He ran the gallery until 1988 and continued to fulfill the program set out by Brehovszky. He organized joint exhibitions of socialist countries (Fine Arts of the Potsdam Region of the GDR, 1983, Fine Artists of the Moscow Region of the USSR, 1984) and exhibitions commemorating the anniversary of the October Revolution, the "liberation" of Czechoslovakia by the Soviet Army, and "Victorious February". During his tenure, expositions of Willi Nowak and František Jiroudek were established in Mělník castle (1981), Václav Rabas in the former synagogue in Rakovník (1982), Josef Lada in Jemniště (1982), and Karel Souček in Kladno (1985) were established during his tenure.

Based on a resolution of the Central Committee of the Communist Party of Czechoslovakia in 1973, the so-called "Roudnice Collection" – a collection of 16th-18th century European art originating from the post-war confiscation of the Lobkowicz family collections – was moved to Nelahozeves. From 1977, only old art was on display at the castle in Nelahozeves. The permanent exhibition of 19th- and 20th-century Czech art was moved to Mladá Boleslav (1982) and then to the castle in Průhonice (1984).

In 1988, painter Miroslav Hanák was appointed director of the Central Bohemian Gallery, but he resigned in October 1989. After the Velvet revolution i November 1989, former employees led by normalizer Jiří M. Boháč attempted to take over the management of the gallery, but eventually capitulated under public pressure.

=== 1990–2009 ===
At the beginning of 1990, a director was appointed for the first time through a competitive selection process. On 1 June 1990, Jan Sekera, previously the long-time director of the Benedikt Rejt Gallery in Louny, was appointed director of the Central Bohemian Gallery. His team of colleagues, which included art historians Jan Kříž, Olaf Hanel, Alena Potůčková, Ivan Neumann and Richard Drury, was faced with the difficult task of filling a twenty-year gap in the acquisition of modern art, especially by artists who had made Czech art famous in the 1960s and who were banned from exhibiting and excluded from galleries during the normalization period. Their works gained international renown in the late 1960s, and after 1990, most became financially unaffordable.

Nelahozeves Castle and the collection of old art were returned to their original owners, the Lobkowicz family, in 1992. After the abolition of the Regional National Committees, the Central Bohemian Gallery came under the jurisdiction of the Ministry of Culture. It once again became primarily a gallery of modern art, although some valuable works of old art, transferred from the SSPPOPSK in the early 1960s, remained in the collection (Hans von Kulmbach, Giulio Romano). In order to distance itself from the period of normalization, the gallery changed its name to the Czech Museum of Fine Arts in Prague in 1993. Since the return of the castle in Nelahozeves, the gallery had been noticeably lacking a suitable depository and space for a permanent exhibition of the collection. Between 1991 and 1995, it used the cloister of Karolinum for exhibitions, and between 1994 and 2002, the renovated House of the Black Madonna.

After Jan Sekera retired, Ivan Neumann became director in 2000, and in 2001, the Czech Museum of Fine Arts in Prague returned to the administration of the Central Bohemian Region. It acquired the former Jesuit College in Kutná Hora as its future premises. The building, constructed between 1667 and 1750, served as military barracks and a military hospital continuously from 1773, following the dissolution of the Jesuit order, until 1998, when the entire complex was acquired by the Czech Museum of Fine Arts in Prague by decision of the Czech government. In 2002, the gallery's headquarters in Husova Street were damaged by flooding and acquisition activities almost ceased, as it was necessary to carry out restoration and conservation work on the collections for future exhibition in Kutná Hora, preserve the collection, and prepare for the move to a new depository. The reconstruction of the Jesuit College took place from 2004 until 8 May 2010, when the new Central Bohemian Gallery was officially opened.

Storage facilities with an area of 1,106 m^{2} and exhibition spaces with a total area of 3,189 m^{2} were created here. According to the original concept developed by Alena Potůčková, a permanent exhibition of the Central Bohemian Gallery was to be established in the college.

=== After 2009 ===
In 2009, Ivan Neumann was dismissed from his position and Jan Třeštík was appointed to manage the gallery. Together with chief curator Ondřej Chrobák, he changed the concept of presenting the collections in favor of curatorial and authors' projects. The gallery actively presented art in secondary schools through the so-called "GASKtour", but also by organizing controversial and critically acclaimed visits by the lay public directly to the depositories. In 2010, Třeštík decided to leave and devote himself to GATE Gallery and Information Centre in the former headquarters of the Czech Museum of Fine Arts in Prague. The author of the first permanent exhibition, which divided the collections according to the three developmental stages of the Central Bohemian Gallery, taking into account the dates of acquisition of individual works, was Marie Bergmanová.

In 2011, Jana Šorfová was appointed director of the gallery by the Central Bohemian Regional Council on the recommendation of an expert selection committee. The gallery's chief curator is Richard Drury, who worked at the Czech Museum of Fine Arts in Prague from 1992 to 2010 as curator of the graphic art, drawing, and sculpture collections, and then lectured on 20th-century art history at the Institute of Art and Design at the University of West Bohemia in Plzeň. Richard Drury is also the author of the new concept for the permanent exhibition "States of Mind / Behind the Image" (2014). In 2015, this exhibition won the prestigious Gloria musaealis Award in the national competition as Museum Exhibition of the Year for its innovative approach. The new exhibition "States of Mind / Behind the Image – Variations and Interventions (2018–2020)" (accompanied by a catalog) has been modified and updated with interventions of contemporary art.

In 2024, as a result of extensive teamwork by the gallery's expert section, a new long-term exhibition entitled Labyrinth was created, loosely inspired by the book The Hero with a Thousand Faces by American religious scholar and ethnologist Joseph Campbell. The thematically conceived selection of works from all areas of art presents well-known works in dialogue with gallery purchases from the last ten years.

== Collections ==
In March 1964, 2,821 works were transferred to the Central Bohemian Gallery from the Centre for State Heritage Preservation and Nature Conservation of the Central Bohemian Region (SSPPOPSK) (worth around CZK 6,000,000) and in 1965 a total of 1,662 art objects (paintings, sculptures, drawings, graphics) from the National Gallery, which had been acquired in previous years by its commission for the purchase of antiques.

The core of the collection consists of works acquired thanks to the concept of the first directors, Miloš Suchomel and Jiří Kohoutek, during the 1960s. The collection of Czech modern art from the pre-war and war periods provides a documentation of the artistic developments of the time. It includes works by the "Social Group" (Miloslav Holý, Karel Holan, Pravoslav Kotík), landscape painters of Umělecká beseda (Václav Rabas, Vlastimil Rada, Karel Boháček), neoclassicism (Jan Zrzavý, Otakar Kubín, Alfréd Justitz, Georges Kars), the landscape school of Otakar Nejedlý, avant-garde abstraction (František Foltýn) and figures such as Zdeněk Sklenář, František Muzika, Vladimír Sychra, František Tichý, Karel Černý, Václav Bartovský and Jan Bauch.

The highlights are the works of the interwar avant-garde and a collection of imaginative art from the 1930s with echoes of lyrical cubism (Wachsman), artificialism (Štyrský, Toyen) and lyricism (Josef Šíma, Jan Bauch, Vojtěch Tittelbach). Surrealism is represented by Jindřich Štyrský, František Janoušek and authors who emerged from the same roots and later became the founders of the important Group 42 (Ladislav Zívr, František Hudeček, František Gross). Other members of the Group 42 are also well represented (Jan Kotík, Kamil Lhoták, Bohumír Matal, Jan Smetana, Karel Souček) and two other important groups of artists from the 1940s who contributed to the formation of the foundations of the existential concept of humanistic aesthetics in Czech art - "Group Ra" (Václav Tikal, Josef Istler, Bohdan Lacina, Václav Zykmund) and the group "Seven in October" (Václav Hejna, Josef Liesler, František Jiroudek, Arnošt Paderlík).

Since its founding, the gallery has followed the exceptionally rich art scene of Czech post-war modernism from the turn of the 1950s and 1960s until the end of the 1960s, when its activities were forcibly interrupted by the Warsaw Pact invasion of Czechoslovakia. Purchases from living artists during the 1960s created a representative collection of members of the newly formed groups "Trasa 54" (students of Emil Filla's studio), "May 57", "UB 12" (former members of Umělecká beseda) and "Etapa". The gallery acquired paintings and sculptures expressing the existential feelings of the late 1950s (Jitka Válová and Květa Válová, Zbyněk Sekal, Olbram Zoubek) and some important works of Czech Informel (Boudník, Valenta, Veselý, Balcar, Medek) and the "Šmidra group" (Jan Koblasa, Karel Nepraš, Bedřich Dlouhý, Jaroslav Vožniak). The collection also includes works of geometric abstraction and artists from the "Crossroads group" (Richard Fremund, Karel Malich, Zdeněk Sýkora, Otakar Slavík, Vladislav Mirvald).

In the 1960s, the gallery acquired sculptures and objects by Vladimír Janoušek, Věra Janoušková, Karel Nepraš, Aleš Veselý, Stanislav Kolíbal, František Pacík, Hugo Demartini, Ladislav Zívr and paintings by Jiří Valenta, Jiří Balcar, Bedřich Dlouhý, Josef Istler, Jiří John, Jan Kotík, Zdeněk Sklenář, Jitka and Květa Válová, Čestmír Kafka, Václav Boštík, Jan Smetana and graphic prints by the Válová sisters and Vladimír Boudník. The collection was enriched with important works by pre-war modernist artists (Jan Bauch, Josef Čapek, František Foltýn, Emil Filla, Václav Hejna, Karel Holan, Georges Kars, Otakar Kubín, Josef Šíma, Václav Špála, Jindřich Štyrský, Václav Tikal, Vojtěch Tittelbach, Toyen, Alois Wachsman).

The Warsaw Pact invasion of Czechoslovakia in August 1968 and the subsequent normalization interrupted the conceptual exhibition and acquisition program of the Central Bohemian Gallery for twenty years. In the following period, the collections were expanded to include, for example, Pioneer Girl Above the Young Guard (1951) by Miroslav Pangrác, works by Karel Souček, Josef Brož, Adolf Zábranský, František Jiroudek and Jan Čumpelík (in the 1950s, author of the giant painting Thanksgiving of the Czechoslovak People to Generalissimo J. V. Stalin) and other pro-regime artists (Kolumek, Svoboda, Krybus) and regional painters (Suchý, Schlesinger, Štolovský).

The most significant addition to the collection from the period of normalization is a collection of art from the late 19th and early 20th centuries, purchased mainly from private collections. At that time, only landscape paintings from the turn of the century were approved by the purchasing committee, and the collection was enriched with works by Julius Mařák, Otakar Lebeda, Alois Kalvoda, František Kaván, Antonín Slavíček, Václav Radimský, Stanislav Lolek, Hugo Boettinger, Václav Jansa, Miloš Jiránek, Václav Rabas, and others.

The communist regime also considered the works of Vojtěch Hynais, Beneš Knüpfer, Luděk Marold, Maximilian Pirner, Jan Konůpek, Jaroslav Panuška, Josef Schusser, Viktor Oliva, Josef Lada, Otakar Nejedlý, Jan Preisler, Karel Špillar, Jakub Schikaneder, Tavík František Šimonto be ideologically acceptable and tolerated also social art by Josef Multrus and sculptures by Jaroslav Horejc, Josef Mařatka, Ladislav Šaloun, Stanislav Sucharda, Jan Štursa, Vincenc Vingler or collections of graphic prints by Vojtěch Preissig and František Kupka.

The interruption in the continuity of modern art purchases could not be remedied after 1989, as the works of most artists, with a few exceptions, became unaffordable. Some works were purchased from extensive retrospective exhibitions organized by the gallery, directly from the artists or from private collectors (Alén Diviš, Alena Kučerová, Rudolf Němec, Jiří Kornatovský, Jiří Sopko, Jan Steklík, Zdeněk Sýkora, Adriena Šimotová). The collections include two strong generations of artists from the 1970s ("Loose association 12/15 Late, but still") and the late 1980s ("The Hardheads Group"), who dominated the art scene after the fall of the communist regime.

A significant part of the vast collection was professionally documented, treated, or restored within a single year, and more than 400 works were gradually published on the GASK Collections Online portal (https://sbirky.gask.cz/), which provides information about the collection items to experts and art lovers from the general public.

=== Selected works from the GASK collection ===
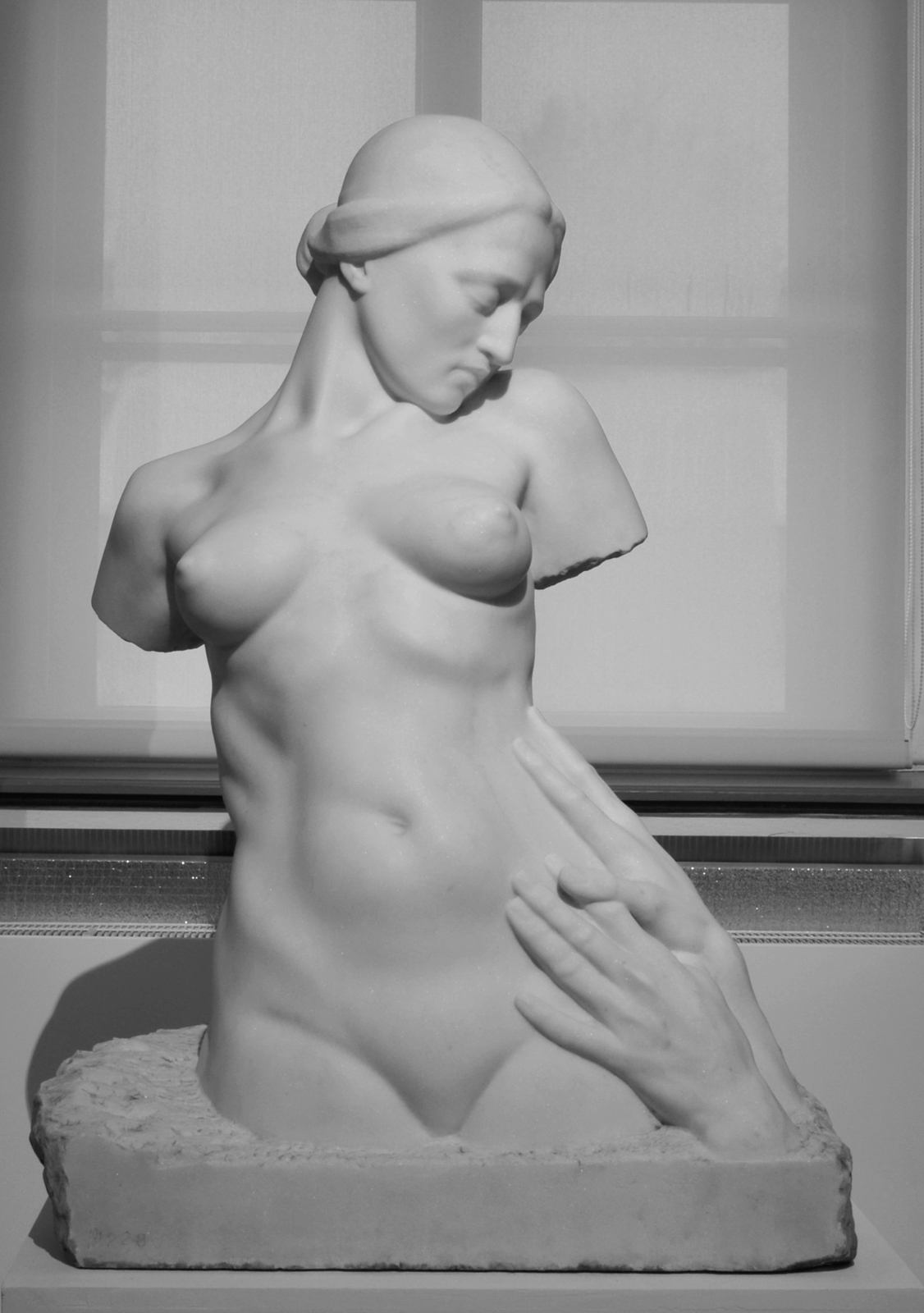
Ladislav Šaloun, A touch of destiny (1924)

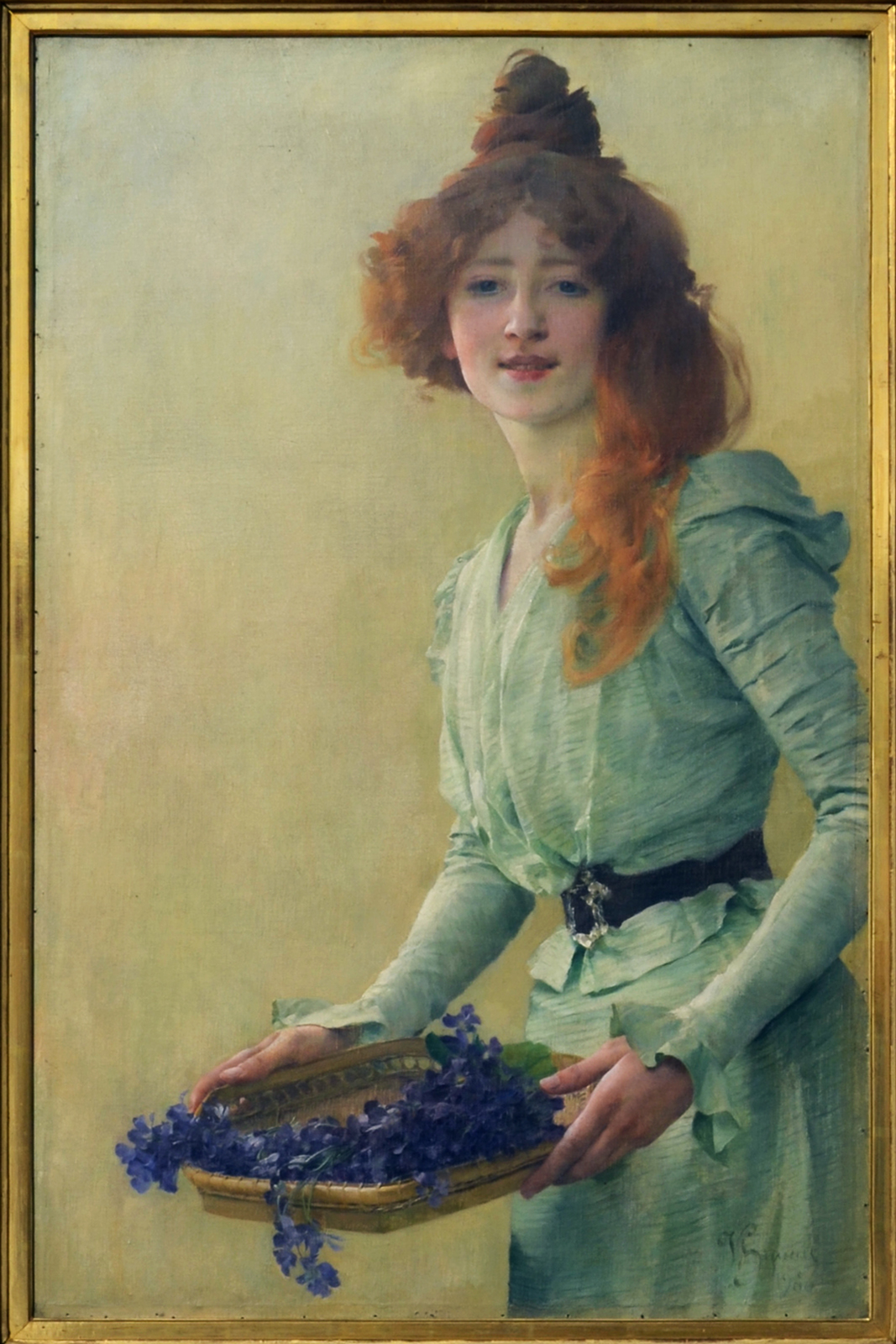
Vojtěch Hynais, Woman with violets (1900)

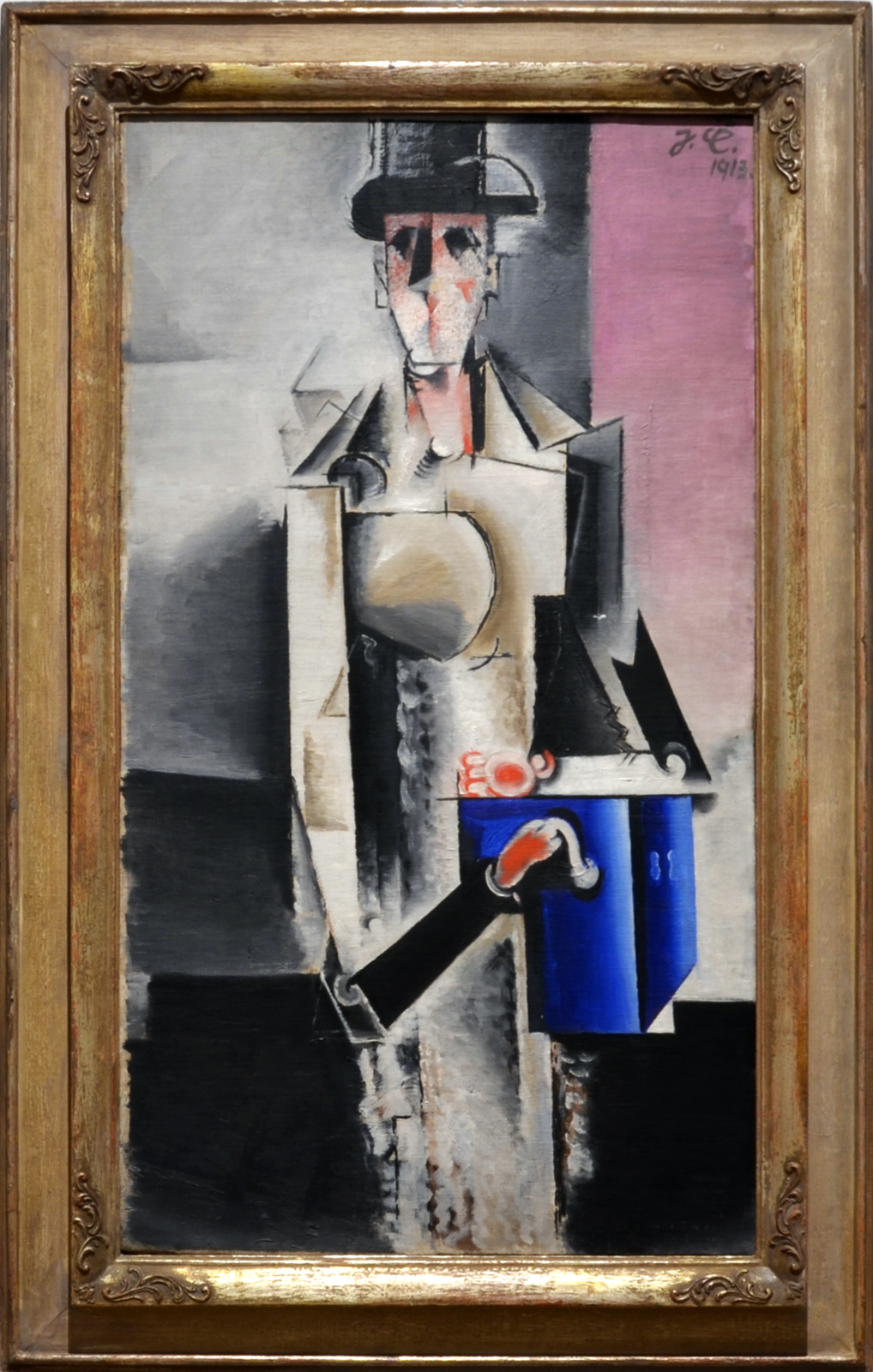
Josef Čapek, Barrel Organist (1913)

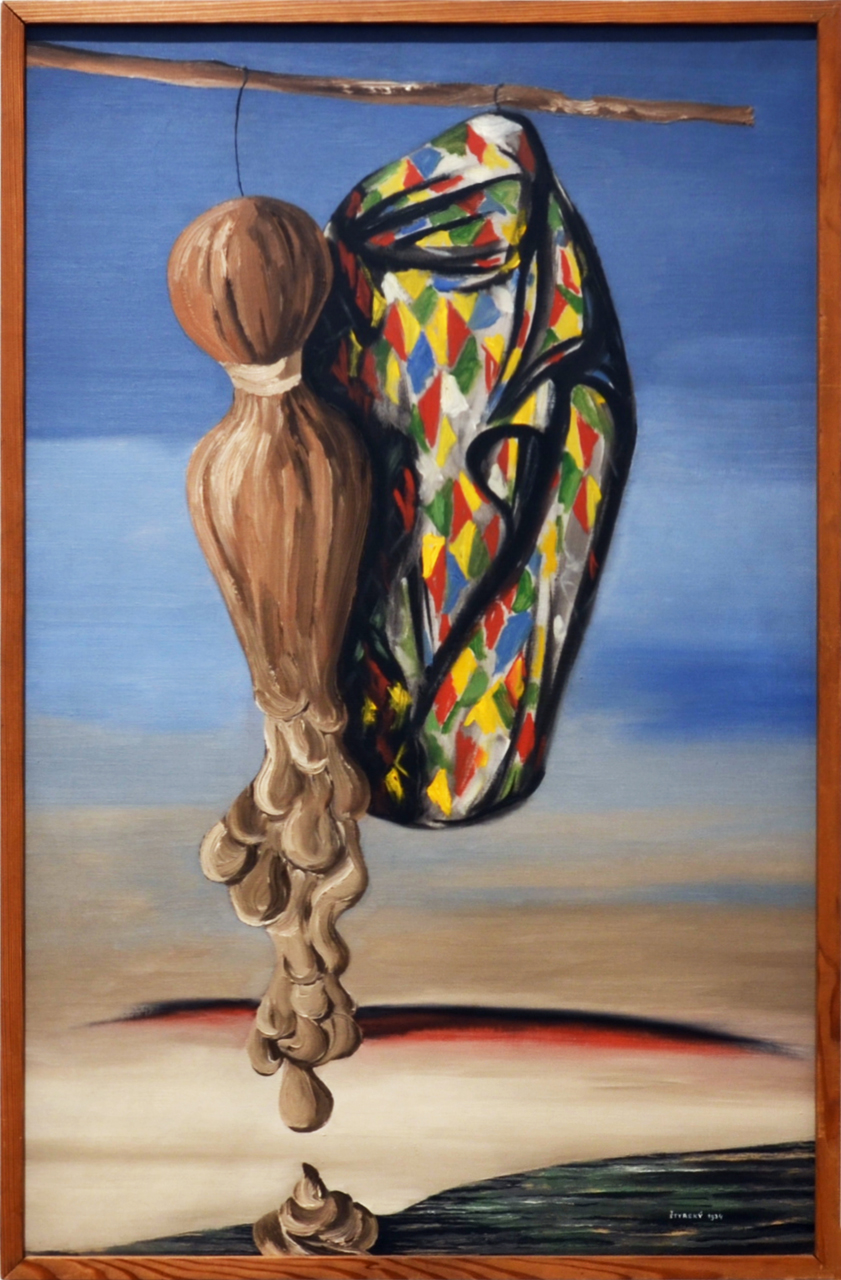
Jindřich Štyrský, Man Carried by the Wind (1934)

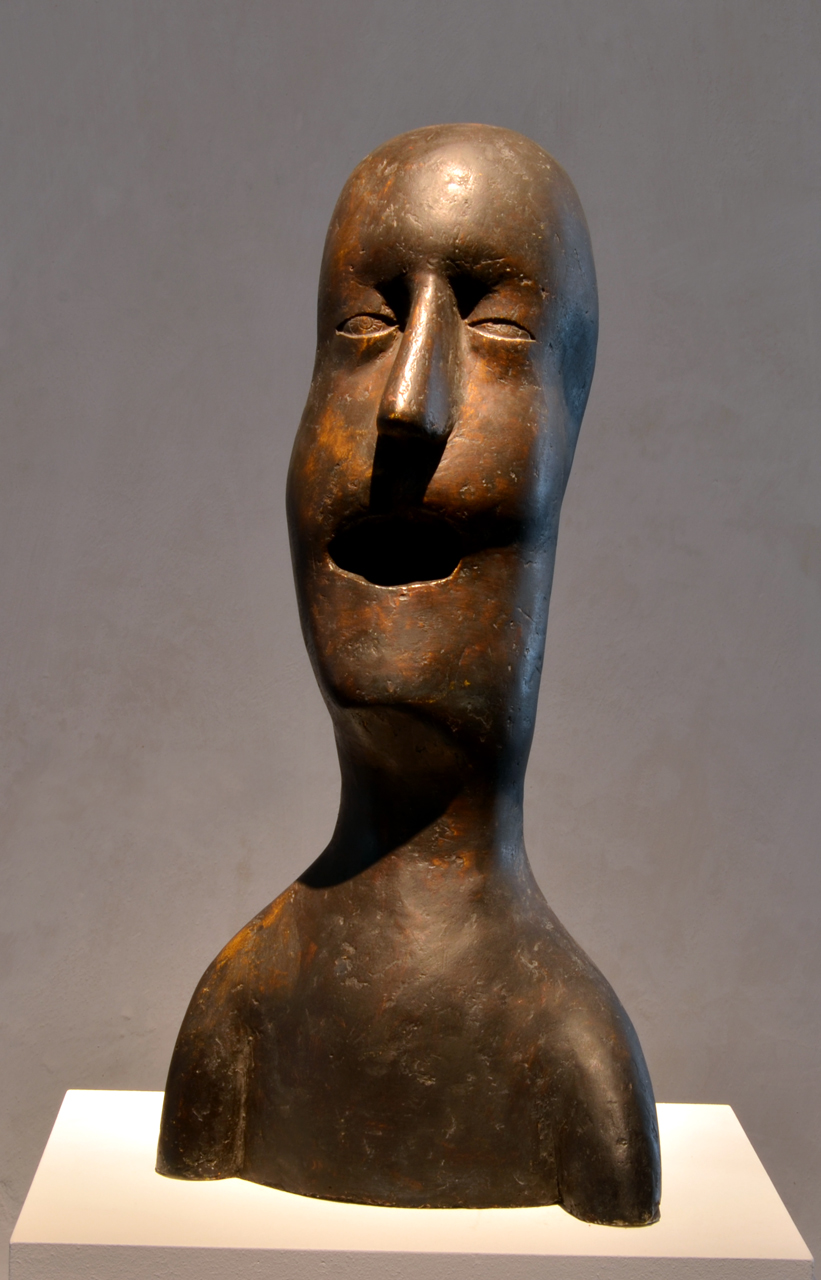
Zbyněk Sekal, Screaming Head (1957)

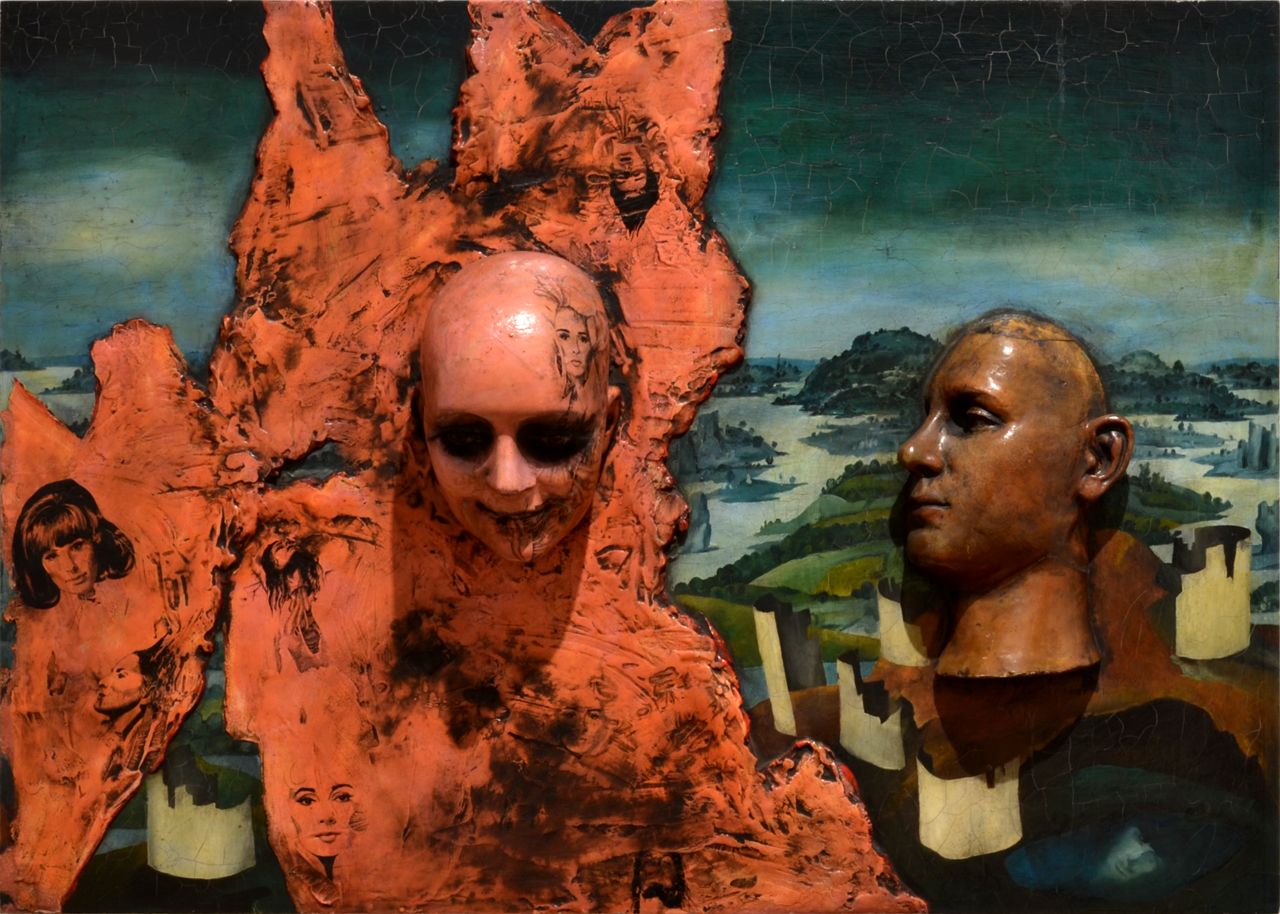
Jaroslav Vožniak, Lovers (1965)

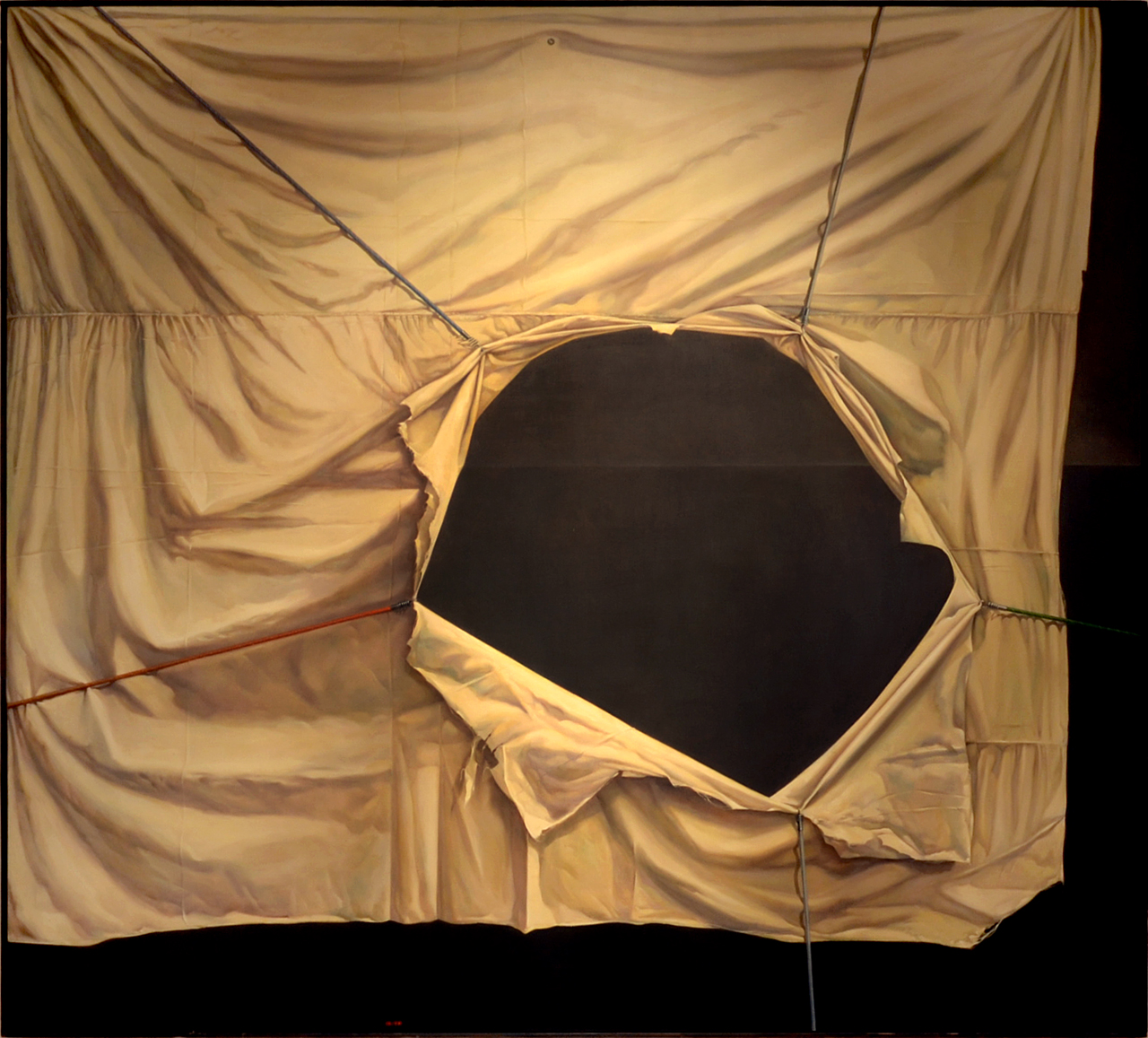
Theodor Pištěk, Czech horizon (1979)

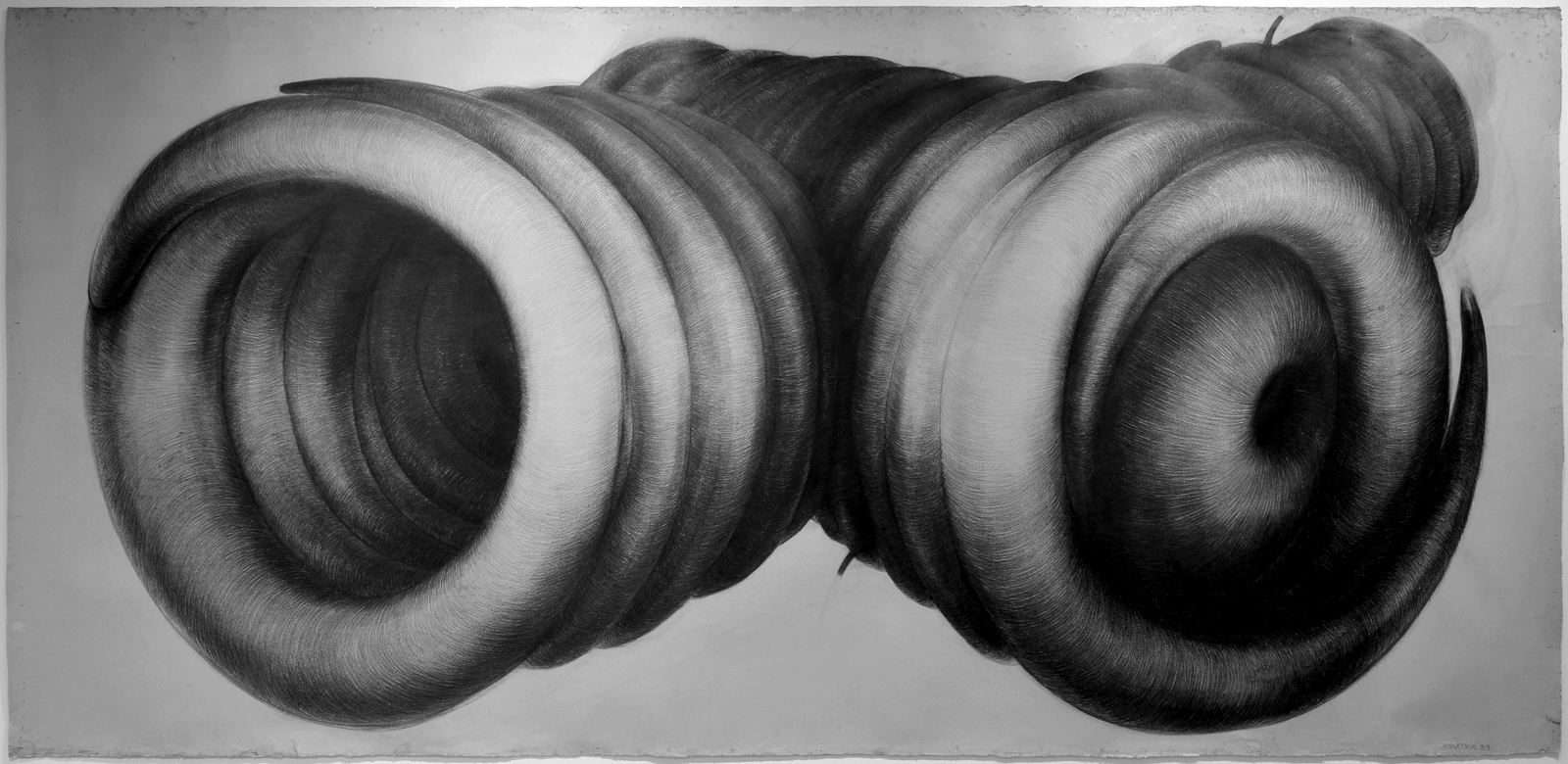
Jiří Kornatovský, Forget everything, coal on cardboard, 220x480 cm (1990–1997)

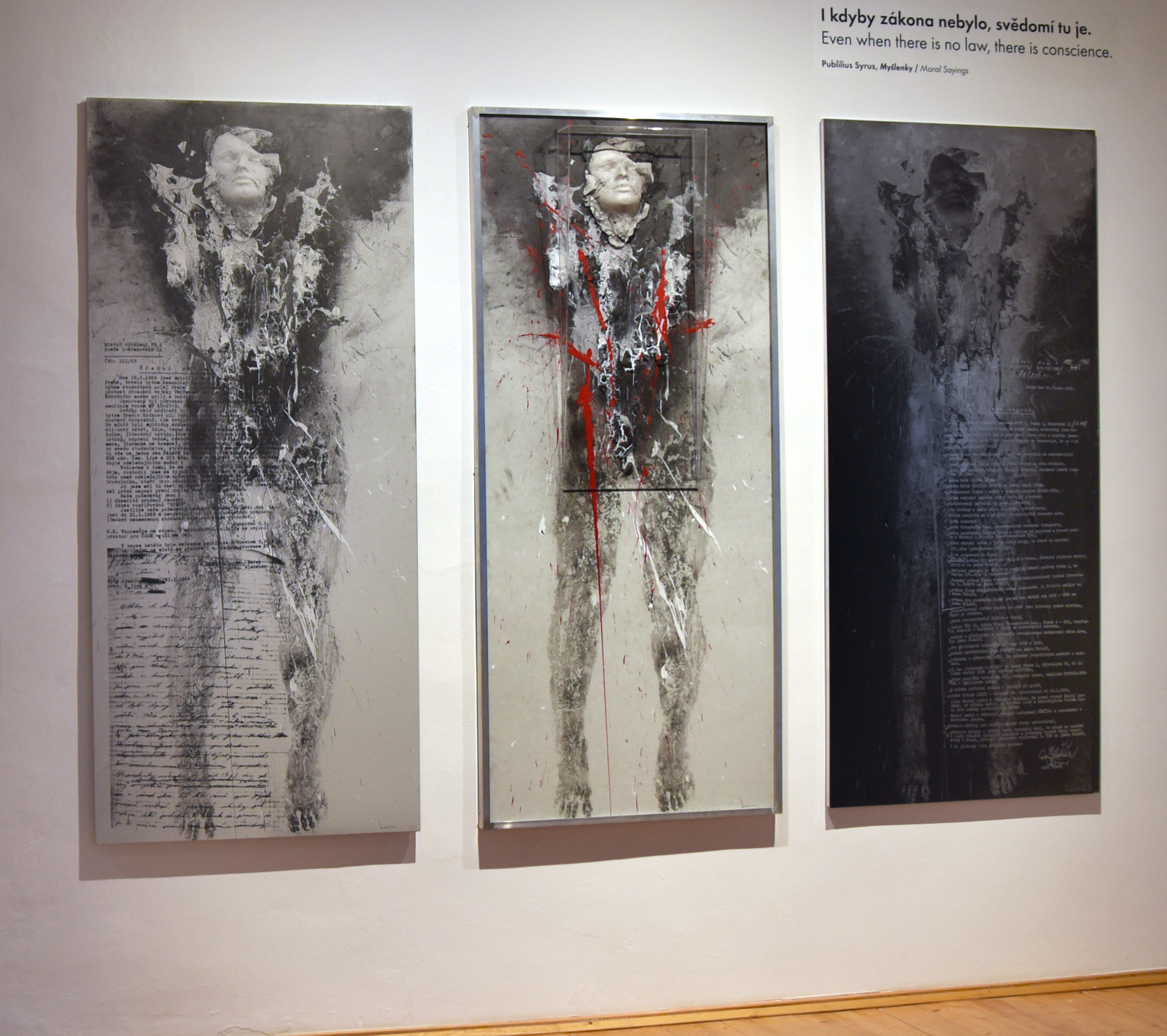
Jiří Sozanský, triptych Jan Palach – Ascension (2019)
