= Symphony No. 8 (Kabeláč) =

1970 composition by Miloslav Kabeláč

The 8th Symphony "Antiphonies", Op. 54, by Miloslav Kabeláč was written in 1970 as a reflection of the composer's feelings from the invasion of Warsaw Pact troops into Czechoslovakia in 1968 and the onset of so-called "normalization" process in the society, which means renewal of strong dictate of the regime of pro-Soviet communist rulers, including heavy loss of basic freedoms for citizens of the country.

The composition consists of nine parts – five movements and four interludes, structure of which is controlled by a firm logical order, proportionally and symmetry. Its structural and expressive axis is the third – the longest movement. The intermedia linking the individual movements correspond both in time and music and differ only in an alternately opposite dynamic succession. The work is written for a percussion ensemble (6 musicians), the organ, a coloration soprano and two mixed choirs (large and small). The text of the vocal part is taken from the Old Testament.

The 8th Symphony was inspired by French ensemble Les Percussions de Strasbourg which presented its premiere with the Czech soloists Jana Jonášová (soprano) and Václav Rabas (organ) in Strasbourg in June 1971.

== Description of composition ==
For this work Kabeláč selected quotations and formulas of a magical and symbolic meaning: Mene, tekel, upharsin – Amen – Hosanna – Hallelujah. The musical language of the Symphony is modal, growing from one of Kabeláč's extraordinary artificial tone-creative principles. The climax of the 3rd movement even suggest a quotation of the Gregorian "Dies irae". The musical expression makes use of elements of exclamation, rhythmic shouts, monotonous and exalted invocations. The basic idea of the work is namely an emphatic warning against the danger of a decline of all positive values of humanity (the historical situation at the time of the origin of the work should be recalled). The suggestive pictures of destruction and suffering alternate at first with apathy. Only later does a beam of hope emerge from the destructive storm and the end of the work suggests the grasping of the hope. It is in fact a positive end, though marred by redeeming suffering.

== Parts ==
I. 1
II. A
III. 2
IV. B
V. 3
VI. C
VII. 4
VIII. D
IX. 5

== Acclaimed recordings ==
- Symphony No. 8 Antiphonies, Metamorphoses II of the Chorale Lord, have mercy on us, Czech Philharmonic Orchestra, Czech Philharmonic Choir, Prague Percussions Ensemble, conducted by Václav Neumann, 1984, Panton, re-release 1990 on CD
  The soloists from the première, Jana Jonášová and Václav Rabas, repeated their roles, soprano and organ.
