= Jesuit College, Kutná Hora =

Coordinates: 49°56′46″N 15°15′50″E

Jesuit College
- Jesuitská kolej
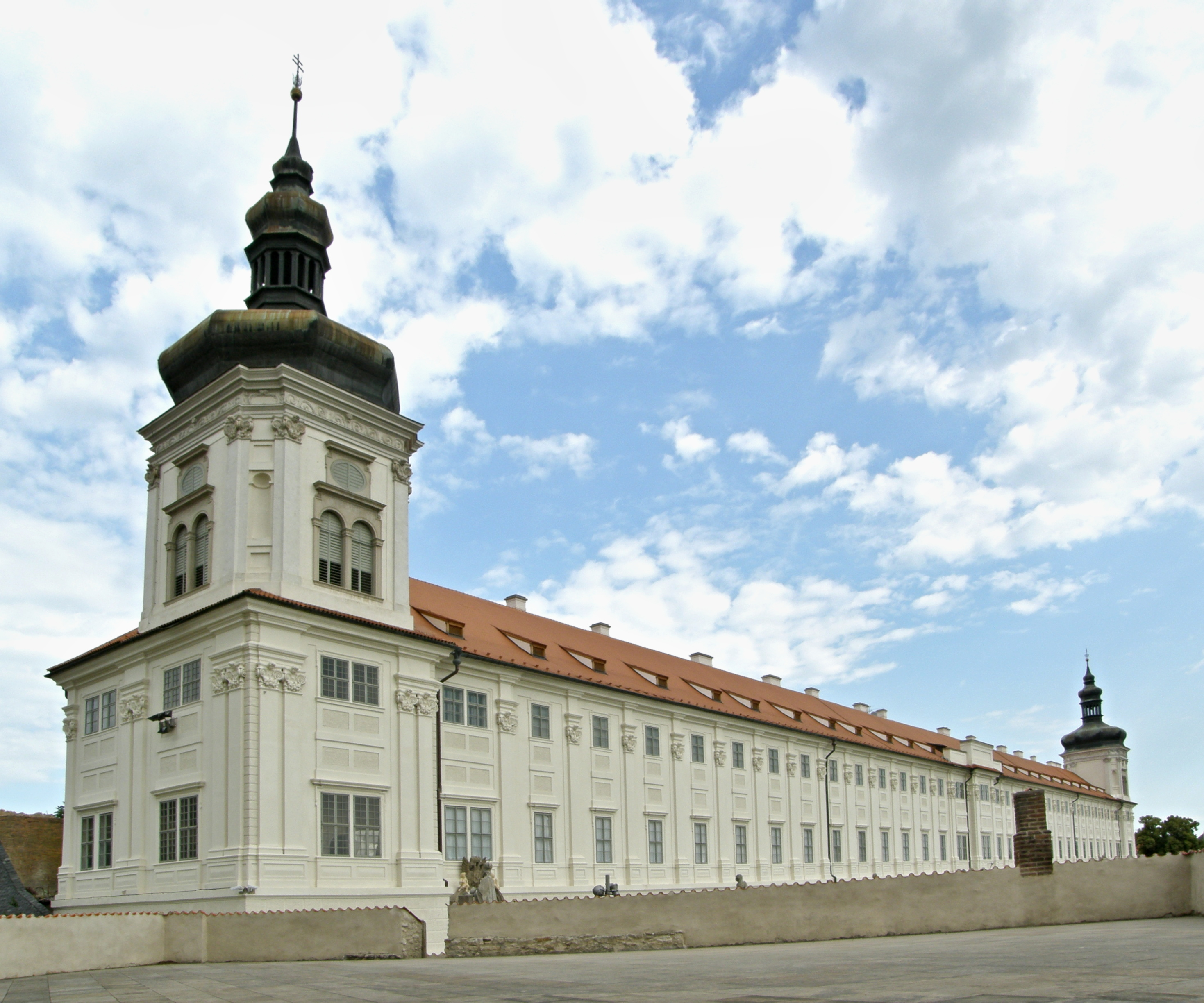
- Interactive map of the Jesuit College area

General information
- Type: Jesuit college
- Location: Kutná Hora, Czech Republic
- Construction started: 1666
- Completed: 1750
- Owner: Central Bohemian Region

Design and construction
- Architects: Giovanni Domenico Orsi, Carlo Lurago

The Jesuit College is a former Jesuit school in Kutná Hora, Czech Republic. It is an early Baroque building, built in 1666–1750.

== History and description ==
It was designed by the architect Giovanni Domenico Orsi and the construction of the building started in 1666. After Orsi's death in 1676, the construction was continued by Carlo Lurago. Construction continued throughout the 18th century, but was never completed to the planned extent. An important part of the complex is the promenade to the Church of St. Barbara with sculptural decoration by František Baugut.

The building has a floorplan in the shape of an "F", is 180 metres (590 ft) long, and has two towers. It is located between the Kutná Hora Old Town and St. Barbara's Church. After functioning as a Jesuit college, it was used as barracks. Since the 21st century, the Gallery of the Central Bohemian Region (GASK) has been located here.
