= Miloslav Kabeláč =

Czech composer and conductor

Portrait of Miloslav Kabeláč

Miloslav Kabeláč (1 August 1908 – 17 September 1979) was a Czech composer and conductor. Kabeláč belongs to the foremost Czech symphonists, whose work is sometimes compared with Antonín Dvořák's and Bohuslav Martinů's. In the communist period, his work was on the periphery of official attention and was performed sporadically and in a limited choice of compositions.

== Life ==
Kabeláč was born in Prague. In 1928–31 he studied at the Prague Conservatory as a pupil of Karel Boleslav Jirák, simultaneously (in 1930–31) he was a pupil of Alois Hába. In 1932–54 Kabeláč was employed by Prague Radio. From 1957 to 1968 he worked as a teacher at the Prague Conservatory. During his life Kabeláč was active in Umělecká beseda, in the Federation of Czechoslovak Composers and other organisations.

In the 1960s he tried to revive contacts with Western modern music and composers, but after the 1968 Soviet invasion of Czechoslovakia he was silenced. His works were performed only abroad from then on.

== Works ==
Miloslav Kabeláč belongs to the most distinguished Czech composers of the 20th century. He soon created a distinctive style for which the auspicious melody and harmony, the ingenious polyphony and the consistent architecture of both small and large compositions are typical. His utmost expression was his conscious work with the intervals in which he emerged from non-European musical cultures. Kabeláč used here, for example, artificially numbered scale - modеs whose internal course has a larger range than an octave. He also denounced the term artificial tonal music, especially for the musical theoretical justification of his economical melody. In the interval structure, he also explored the possibilities of so-called interval augmentation and diminution, inversion and other practices brought to the music by the so-called 2nd Viennese school. The first mature compositions of this style include the anti-cantata Do not retreat! (1939), performed for the first time after the end of the Second World War (28 October 1945).

At the beginning and in the years of war, Kabeláč focused on chamber opuses (Wind Sextet, Sonata for cello and piano, Two pieces for violin and piano) and Symphonic (1st and 2nd symphonies). Over time, work with large occupation (8th symphony, Mysterium of Time, Reflections), which are his most significant works - along with songs for drums that have already come on European stages at the time (Eight Inventions for percussions). In the 1960s, which gave him wide recognition in the form of the State Prize and Foreign Orders, he received a number of stimuli from foreign avant-garde, which he had organically incorporated into his compositional morphology. He also excelled in pedagogical activities and interest in non-European cultures. He was one of the first promoters of electro-acoustic music in Czechoslovakia.

Numerous choreographers have also taken up his work "Eight Inventions for Percussion Instruments. ", Alvin Ailey with the American Dance Theater are the most prominent among them, his choreography titled Streams, was performed in Prague too in 1979.

=== Symphonies ===
- Symphony No. 1 in D for strings and percussion, Op. 11 (1941–42)
- Symphony No. 2 in C for large orchestra, Op. 15 (1942–46)
- Symphony No. 3 in F for organ, brass and timpani, Op. 33 (1948–57)
- Symphony No. 4 in A, "Chamber Symphony", Op. 36 (1954–58)
- Symphony No. 5 in B flat minor, "Dramatic", for soprano without text, and orchestra, Op. 41 (1960)
- Symphony No. 6 "Concertante", for clarinet and orchestra, Op. 44 (1961–62)
- Symphony No. 7 for orchestra and reciter on the composer's text after the Bible, Op. 52 (1967–68)
- Symphony No. 8 "Antiphonies", for soprano, mixed choir, percussion and organ, on words from the Bible, Op. 54 (1970)

=== Further orchestral works ===
- Overture No. 1 for orchestra, Op. 6 (1939)
- Overture No. 2 for large orchestra, Op. 17 (1947)
- Childish Moods. Little orchestral suite, Op. 22 (1955)
- Suite from the music to Sophocles' Electra for alto, female choir and orchestra, Op. 28a (1956)
- Mystery of Time. Passacaglia for large orchestra, Op. 31 (1953–57)
- Three Melodramas to accompany the play Kuo Mo-jo "Master of Nine Songs" for reciter and chamber orchestra, Op. 34b (1957)
- Hamlet Improvisation for large orchestra, Op. 46 (1962–63)
- Reflections. Nine miniatures for orchestra, Op. 49 (1963–64)
- Metamorphoses II, for piano and orchestra, Op. 58 (1979)

=== Piano compositions ===
- Passacaglia TGM, Op. 3 (1937)
- 7 compositions for piano, Op. 14 (1944–47)
- Easy Preludes, Op. 26 (1955)
- 8 preludes for piano, Op. 30 (1955–56)
- Cizokrajné motivy – Motifs from Foreign Countries, Op. 38 (1959)
- Small Suite for piano 4 hands, Op. 42 (1960)

=== Organ compositions ===
- Fantasies for organ in G minor and D minor, Op. 32 (1957–58)
- 4 preludes for organ, Op. 48 (1963)

=== Other chamber compositions ===
- Wind Sextet, Op. 8 (1940)
- Sonatina for oboe and piano, Op. 24 (1955)
- Ballad for violin and piano, Op. 27 (1956)
- Suite for saxophone and piano, Op. 39 (1959)
- 8 Invenzioni for percussion instruments, Op. 45 (1962–63)
- Otto ricercari, for percussion instruments, Op. 51 (1966–67)
- Lamenti e risolini 8 bagatelles, for flute and harp, Op. 53 (1969)
- Fated Dramas of Man. Sonata for trumpet, piano and percussion instruments with recitation, Op. 56 (1975–76)

=== Compositions for solo voice with accompaniment ===
- Moravian Lullabies for soprano and chamber orchestra, on texts from folk poetry, Op. 20 (1951)
- Love Songs for soprano, baritone and piano, Op. 25 (1955)
- Six Lullabies on text folk poetry for alto solo, small female choir and instrumental ensemble, or for alto and piano, Op. 29 (1955)
- Hunters' Songs for baritone and 4 horns, Op. 37 (1958–59)
- Echoes from Far Away. 5 songs for alto and piano, without words, Op. 47 (1963)

=== Choruses ===
- 6 choruses for male choir on words by Jiří Wolker, Op. 10 (1939–40)
- Blue Sky. Children's choruses on the poetry by František Hrubín, after the pictorial cycle of Josef Čapek, Op. 19 (1950)
- To Nature. Cycle of children's choruses on the words of folk poetry, Op. 35 (1957–58)

=== Cantatas ===
- Do Not Retreat!. Cantata for male voice choir, wind and percussion instruments on folk texts and the words of the chorale "Ye Warriors of God", Op. 7 (1939)
- Eufemias mysterion (Mystery of Silence), for soprano and chamber orchestra to Greek words, Op. 50 (1964–65)
- Metamorphoses I of the oldest Czech chorale for mixed choir, solo baritone, male voice choir and solo higher female voice), Op. 57 (1979)

=== Electro-acoustic music ===
- E fontibus Bohemicis. Visiones sex (6 tableaux from Czech annals), Op. 55 (1965–72) [Latin for From Bohemian springs: Six views]
