= Alena Potůčková =

Czech art historian

Alena Potůčková (19 March 1953 in Roudnice nad Labem – 6 November 2018 in Prague) was a Czech art historian and curator. She served as the director of the Gallery of Modern Art in Roudnice nad Labem from 2008 to 2018.

== Biography ==
In 1977-1992 she worked in the Department of Regional Galleries at the National Gallery in Prague, and from the early 1990s as curator of the Modern Art Collection there. In 1992, at the urging of the then director Jan Sekera, she moved to the Central Bohemian Gallery (renamed the Czech Museum of Fine Arts in Prague in 1993) and worked there as curator of the painting collection until 2008. After the change of management and the relocation of the ČMVU to Kutná Hora, she applied for the competition for the position vacated by Miroslava Hlaváčková and in 2008 the Council of the Ústí Region appointed her director of the Gallery of Modern Art in Roudnice nad Labem. In 2001-2004 she was a member, later a member of the Board of the Council of Galleries and a member of the Chamber of Curators. In 2000-2005 she was a member of the committee of the Art History Society. She is the author of hundreds of texts for exhibition catalogues and articles in the specialist press (Výtvarná kultura, Výtvarné umění, Ateliér, Prostor Zlín, Revue Art, comprehensive publications of galleries, encyclopaedias of modern art).
