= Jiří Kornatovský =

Czech painter, draughtsman and printmaker (1952–2025)

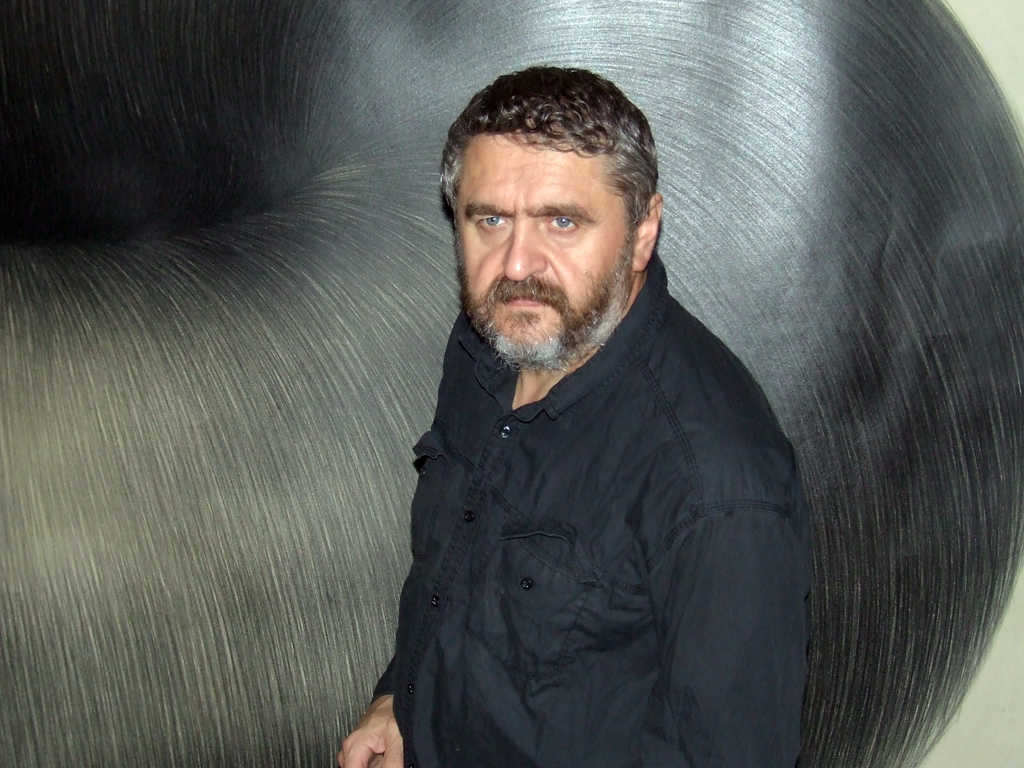
Jiří Kornatovský in 2014

Jiří Kornatovský (2 March 1952 – 5 November 2025) was a Czech painter, draughtsman and printmaker.

== Life and career ==
Jiří Kornatovský was born in Plasy, Czechoslovakia on 2 March 1952. His artistic standpoint and life opinions were formed mostly by his childhood and youth spent in Plasy, where he roamed almost daily, until the age of 21, in an abandoned Cistercian monastery.

After graduating from a technical teaching school in Plzeň, he studied at the College and High Art School of Václav Hollar in 1977–1982, followed by the study of monumental painting at the Academy of Fine Arts in Prague with professors Arnošt Paderlík and Jiří Ptáček (1982–1987).

At the end of the 1980s, he published a number of spiritual manifestos and in 1991 he co-founded Hermit Foundation in the Cistercian monastery in Plasy. He created the Codes and Signs project at the international art symposium Hermit 92. In the following years he attended study and creative residences in the Carmelite monastery in Sejny, Poland (1992), in Florence (1993), New York City and Boston (1994–1995) and Hohenosig, Germany (1997). During his stay in the USA, he held a series of exhibitions and lectures. In 2005 and 2006, he worked in the Augustinian monastery at Malá Strana in Prague and again he visited the United States (Los Angeles).

In the years 1998–1999, he founded his own Gallery Hermit in Prague.

Kornatovský worked as a university professor at the Charles University in Prague and at the Art and Design Faculty, University of West Bohemia in Plzeň. He lectured at the School of the Museum of Fine Arts in Boston, where he carried out the legendary Burning lecture. He introduced and defined the principle of his discovery of declarative drawing as a process method of artistic creation and the approach to it at a lecture in the Bachelard amphitheatre at the Sorbonne in Paris.

He says about himself that he does not know where the artistic work begins and the presence of everyday reality ends. Meditation in the process of the linear layering of the structure of the painting is always present even without him striving for it. He perceives analysis and interpretation in art as negative fragmentation of the painting and disintegration of the character of the self. He reflects the aesthetics of St. Augustine mainly when it comes to integration and wholeness.

Kornatovský died on 5 November 2025, at the age of 73.

== Work ==
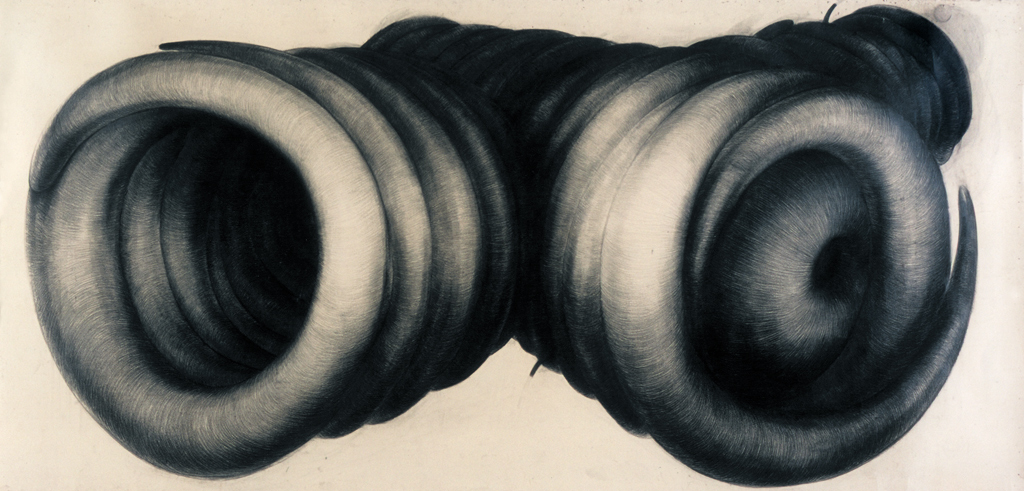
Forget everything, 220 x 460 cm (1990–1997)

Jiří Kornatovský is mostly known as an author of unique large black and white charcoal drawings of plastic objects on giant cardboard that gained him respect and recognition. These drawings stand outside the Czech artistic tradition due to their artistic rendition, and when they first appeared on the art scene in the middle of the 1980s, it seemed to be an apparition.

In his approach, the drawing is mostly a record of its own creation, not a composition of form with arbitrary influence. Up to a certain point, it is a documentation of action. This action is of a psychological and physical character and is designed for private space and not for the public. The author is not primarily concerned with representation. His work is not about diversity of images and their individual messages. Kornatovský focuses on continuity, the repetition of actions of a ritual character. The subject is, therefore, rather a certain maintenance of the order of events in the rhythm of cyclical (archetypal) time.

Kornatovský’s "discovery" of the abstract object that is the carrier of the subjective experience and personal transformation is, by its own simplicity and the number of universal archetypal meanings, unique and independent. When considered in the history of art, it may be compared, for example, to the Black Suprematic square of Kazimir Malevich, White Paintings of Robert Rauschenberg, Morgenstern’s Fish’s Night Song or John Cage’s "4´33´´".

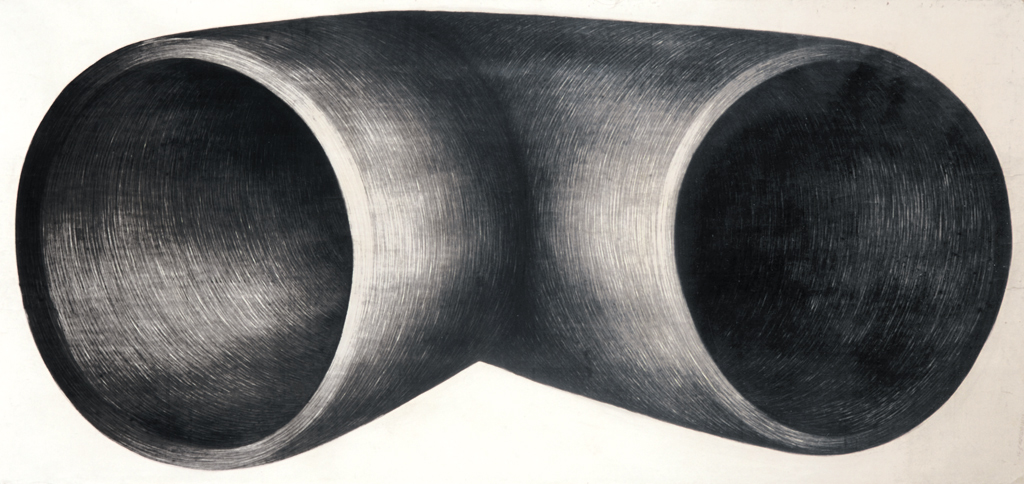
From nowhere to nowhere (Silence), 220 x 480 cm (1989)

At the very beginning there were drawings and large graphic sheets depicting relationships (Two – Free variation on an hour of the lovers, 1988, etching, All at once, 1989, etching, GASK, And tickle, charcoal on paper, 200 x 380 cm, 1988), sometimes with a hidden erotic subtext (Shape of adventure, 1987). They are characterised by accurate execution and the use of abstract symbols derived from natural shapes. The composition of the event contains a secret. Space is not defined, the story pours over the horizon where we cannot see (Is anybody else coming? (Countryside), etching with aquatint, 1988, GASK), the outlined opening into the interior of the object offers only darkness but there is light coming out of the crack on the other side (One, 1988).

At the end of the 1980s, Kornatovský drew abstract playful images dedicated to his family (… oh you people, 1989) and celebrating the joy of a newborn child (That and that and that-a-thing, 1988, charcoal on paper, 150 x 360 cm).

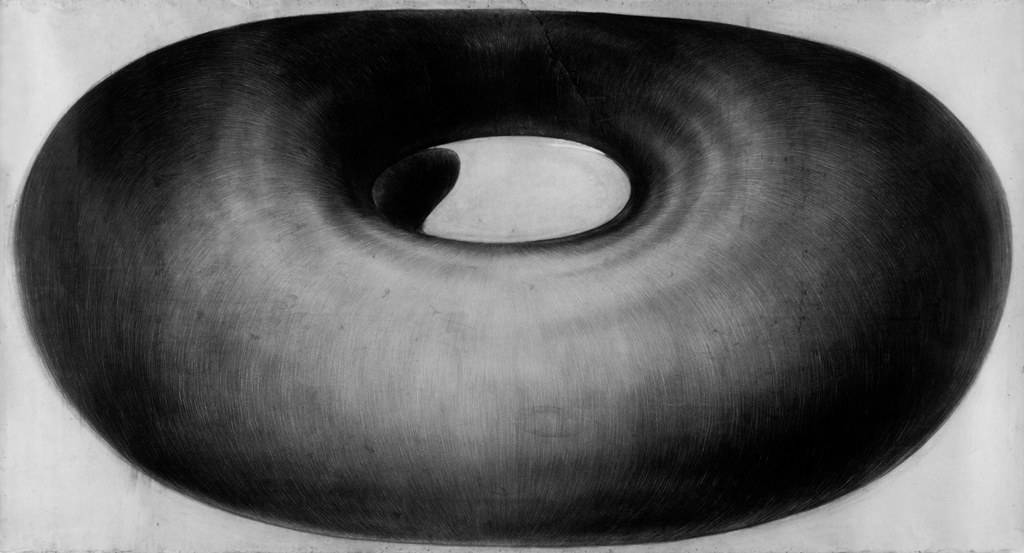
Liturgic meditation, 220 x 460 cm (1990–1994)

Large objects from the early 1990s depict organic shapes (And out/aerial meditation, charcoal on cardboard, 220 x 500 cm, 1990–1992; It, charcoal on cardboard, 220 x 480 cm, 1989–1992). The duration of their creation reflects the technical process of these drawings.

When interpreting the large-format drawing from the same period (From nowhere to nowhere – Forget everything/ You are what you cannot remember/, graphite, cardboard, 220 x 460 cm, 1990–1997, GASK) it is necessary to also take into account the social atmosphere by the end of the 1980s and the seemingly hopeless situation of young artists, participants of the unofficial group Confrontations. According to the author, the drawing reflects feelings, in which the experience of a child is mixed with the empty spaces of an abandoned monastery and the situation of the confined space of a studio. Another variation on the same theme is a stark, almost technical drawing of a broken tube with a dark mouth (From nowhere to nowhere/silence, charcoal on cardboard, 220 x 480 cm, 1989).

The series of meditation drawings (Meditation by drawing) derives from Meditation (1990, exhibited 2006, Museum Kampa), where the plastic object in the shape of a toroid encloses some abstract country inside. The surface of the rotational body is sometimes disrupted and expands into space (In space, 1992). The torus itself represents a perfect shape that has neither end, nor beginning and optically centralises attention to the middle, just like the electric toroid coil, which induces the magnetic field in its centre (Prayer, charcoal 275 x 705 cm, 2000-20003, Meditation in archetype, combined technique on canvas, 210 x 220 cm, 2006, Meditation by archetype, combined technique on canvas, 210 x 220 cm, 2000-2010).

This shape also offers the possibility of mathematical transformation, during which the whole object can be turned inside out through eversion (like From nowhere to nowhere, 1990–1997), to work in a 4D space and to decrease the central space through shortening of the axis, leading to final degeneration into a sphere. (It, charcoal on cardboard, 220 x 480 cm, 1989–92).

The drawings, however, cannot be interpreted merely as a mathematical game. The author often creates them in a monastery cloister over the span of a few years and besides the artistic performance they are also a result of spiritual concentration connected with meditation. (To one point, charcoal on cardboard, 220 x 280 cm, 2000).

Objects depicted are neither anchored in space, nor related to earth. A mild asymmetry sometimes gives the impression of them growing upwards (Meditation by drawing, charcoal on cardboard, 600 x 220 cm, 1988–89). Titles of the meditation drawings offer riddles rather than explanations (Meditation eastern, 1990–97, 220 x 520 cm, Liturgic meditation, 1990–1994).

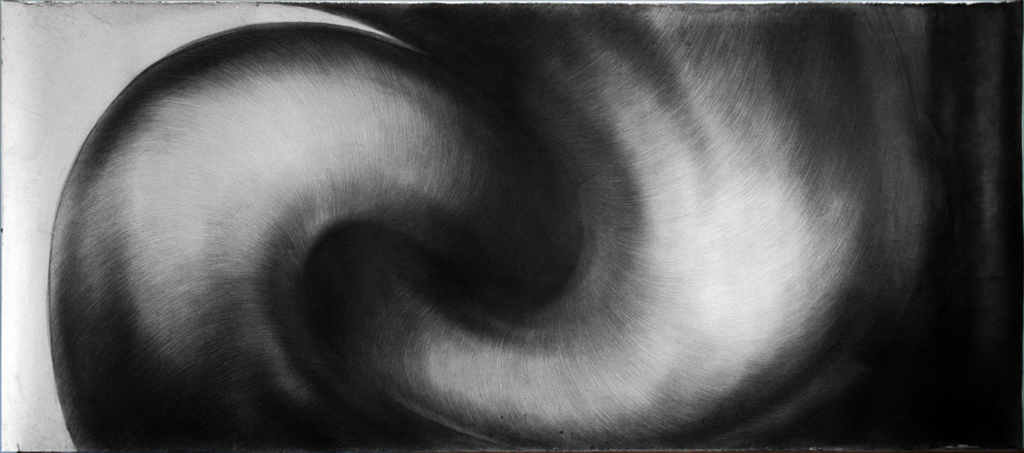
Eternal story, 220 x 500 cm (1990–1994)

The large format paintings sometimes only capture a part of the depicted object in order to leave space for pondering about the things that surpass us (Right left, Martin meditation, charcoal on cardboard, 220 x 540 cm, 1989–93, Eternal story, charcoal on cardboard, 220 x 500 cm, 1990–1994, Sanctus, charcoal on cardboard, 220 x 520 cm, 1997–1999), or they directly refer to infinity (88.88.88., combined technique on canvas, 100 x 120 cm, 2010). Organic form in the drawing resembling a gastrula can be interpreted as an immersion of what was on the surface into the inside, into the darkness, into the closure from the outside world (Remembering an idea, charcoal on canvas, 210 x 240 cm, 2005-6).

The key to understanding Kornatovský’s drawings may be St. Augustine’s treatise on the reflection of the world of ideas and sensory reality (Augustine, charcoal on paper, 280 x 340 cm, 2000-3, St. Augustine II, combined technique on canvas, 140 x 160 cm, 2007, Contemplation, charcoal on canvas, 80 x 100 cm, 2008).

=== Awards ===
- 1994 Mayor of Kraków Award, Graphic Art Triennial, Kraków, Poland
- 2008 Laureate of the Franz Kafka Prague circle Award

=== Representation in collections ===
- National Gallery of Art, Washington D.C., United States
- National Gallery in Prague, Czech Republic
- Queensland Art Gallery, Brisbane, Australia
- Museum Kampa, Meda Mládková collection, Prague, Czech Republic
- GASK – the Gallery of the Central Bohemian Region, Kutná Hora, Czech Republic
- West Bohemian Gallery, Plzeň, Czech Republic
- Aleš South Bohemian Gallery, Hluboká nad Vltavou, Czech Republic
- Klatovy/Klenová Gallery, Czech Republic
- Gallery of Modern Art Roudnice nad Labem, Czech Republic
- Regional Gallery Karlovy Vary, Czech Republic
- Regional Gallery Liberec, Czech Republic
- Consulate General of the Czech Republic, Los Angeles, United States
- Bellini Gallery, Florence, Italy
- Artists Centre, Eindhoven, Netherlands
- Kentler International Drawing Center, New York, United States
- Private collections in Czech Republic and abroad

=== Selected solo exhibitions ===
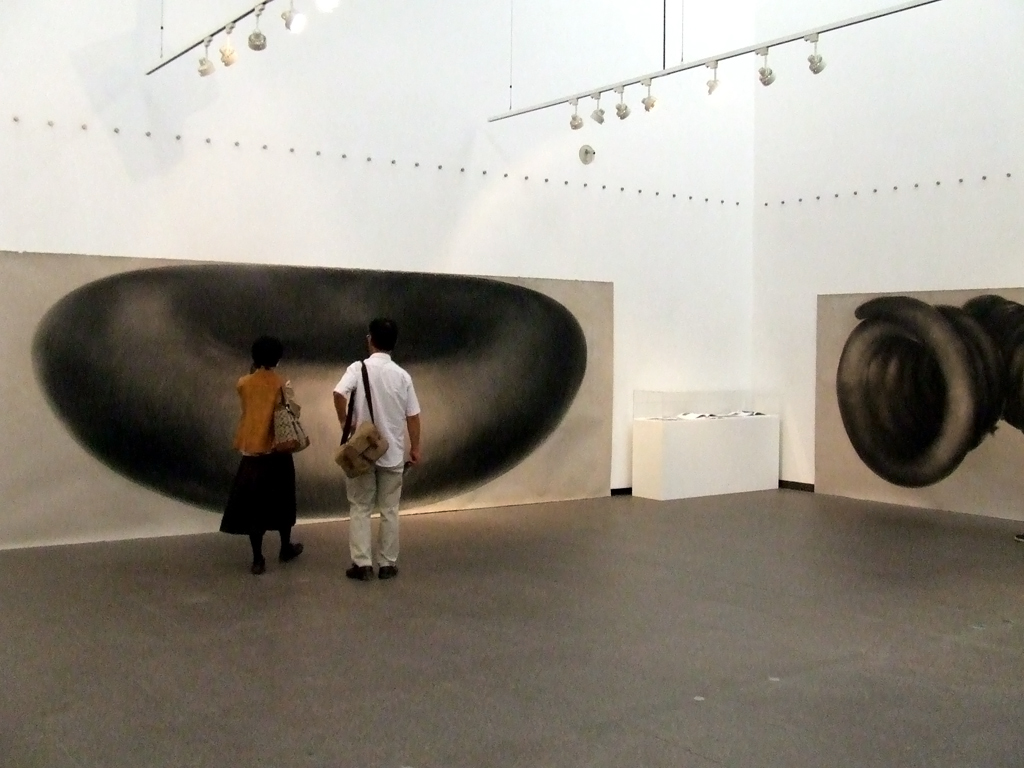
Jiří Kornatovský at Takasaki Gallery (2009)

- 2014 Intuiti Gallery, Paris, France
- 2013 Michel Journiac Gallery - Sorbonne, Paris, France

Galerie du Tableau, (with Richard Conte), Marseille, France
Hollar Gallery, Prague, Czech Republic

- 2012 Bottega Gallery, Kyiv, Ukraine
- 2009 Takasaki City Gallery, Japan (with J. Váchal)
- 2008 Parliament of the Czech Republic, Prague, Czech Republic
- 2006 ASTO Museum, Los Angeles, (with K. Czerpak)

Museum Kampa, Prague, Czech Republic
Plzeň City Gallery, Czech Republic

- 2004 The world paper, Frankfurt, Germany
- 2003 National Gallery in Prague, Czech Republic
- 1997 Hermit Gallery, Prague, Czech Republic
- 1995 Kentler International Drawing Space, New York City

PAAS gallery, New York City

- 1994 Boston Center for the Arts

School of the Museum of Fine Arts, Boston
PAAS gallery, New York City

- 1993 Nová síň Gallery, Prague, Czech Republic
- 1992 The Hague City Hall
- 1991 OKO Gallery, Amsterdam

Plasy monastery, Czech Republic
Kortenhoef, North Holland

- 1990 St. Nicholas Church, Prague, Czech Republic
- 1985 Plasy monastery, Czech Republic
- 1980 Plasy monastery, Czech Republic

=== Group exhibitions ===
- Jiří Kornatovský participated in more than 200 group exhibitions both at home and abroad

=== Publications ===
- (cz) Jiří Kornatovský : Meditace kresbou, 2011, Fenclová H, Pangrácová L, Kroupová M, kat. nestr., G. Klatovy/Klenová ISBN 978-80-87013-31-1, OG Liberec, ISBN 978-80-85050-92-9
- (cz, jap) Jiří Kornatovský a Josef Váchal: Hory a srdce, 2009, Hucl I., Klínková H., Jindra P., Hánová M., Fišer M., sborník, 96 str., Muzeum Šumavy Sušice, ISBN 978-80-87235-01-0
- (cz, en, jap) Jiří Kornatovský, 2006, Binder I, Mládková M, kat. 12 s., Nadace J a M Mládkových, ISBN 80-239-6094-6
- (cz, en) Jiří Kornatovský: Meditace kresbou / Meditation in drawing, 2003, Janištinová Jirková A, Raimanová I, kat. 36 s., NG Praha, ISBN 80-239-2638-1
- (cz) Jiří Kornatovský: Meditace - modlitby, 2003, Kornatovský J, Koval M, kat. 8s., G. J. Jílka, Šumperk
- (cz) Jiří Kornatovský: Kresby, 2002, Tetiva V, kat. 32 s., AJG Hluboká, ISBN 80-85857-55-3
- (en) Jiří Kornatovský: Graphic Drawings, 1995, Pánková M, kat. 4 s., PAAS Gallery, New York
- (cz) Jiří Kornatovský: Kresby, 1994, tx. Kornatovský J, G. Klatovy/Klenová
- (cz) Jiří Kornatovský: Kresby, 1991, Pánková M, Vojtěchovský M, kat. 20 s., Unie výtvarných umělců České republiky, Praha
- (cz, en, fr, de) Jiří Kornatovský: Nototo (Kresby, grafika), 1989, Raimanová I, kat. 4 s., klášter Plasy
- (cz) Jiří Kornatovský: Kresby, grafika, obrazy, 1989, Machalický J, kat. 8+1 s., SČVU, Praha
- (cz) Jiří Kornatovský: Kresby, grafika, 1988, Kotalík J, kat. 8 s., PKO KS Hroznová

==== Encyclopaedia ====
- (cz) Slovník českých a slovenských výtvarných umělců 1950 - 2001, 2001, Pavliňák P, Výtvarné centrum Chagall, Ostrava, ISBN 80-86171-06-X
- (cz) Nová encyklopedie českého výtvarného umění, 1995, Horová A, Academia, Praha, ISBN 80-200-0536-6
- (cz, en) Grafika: Obrazová encyklopedie české grafiky osmdesátých let / Pictorial Encyclopaedia of the Czech prints of the 1980s, 1993, Hošková Vomočilová S, Schleppe S, Středoevropská galerie a nakladatelství, Praha, ISBN 80-901559-0-1
