= Georges Kars =

Czech painter

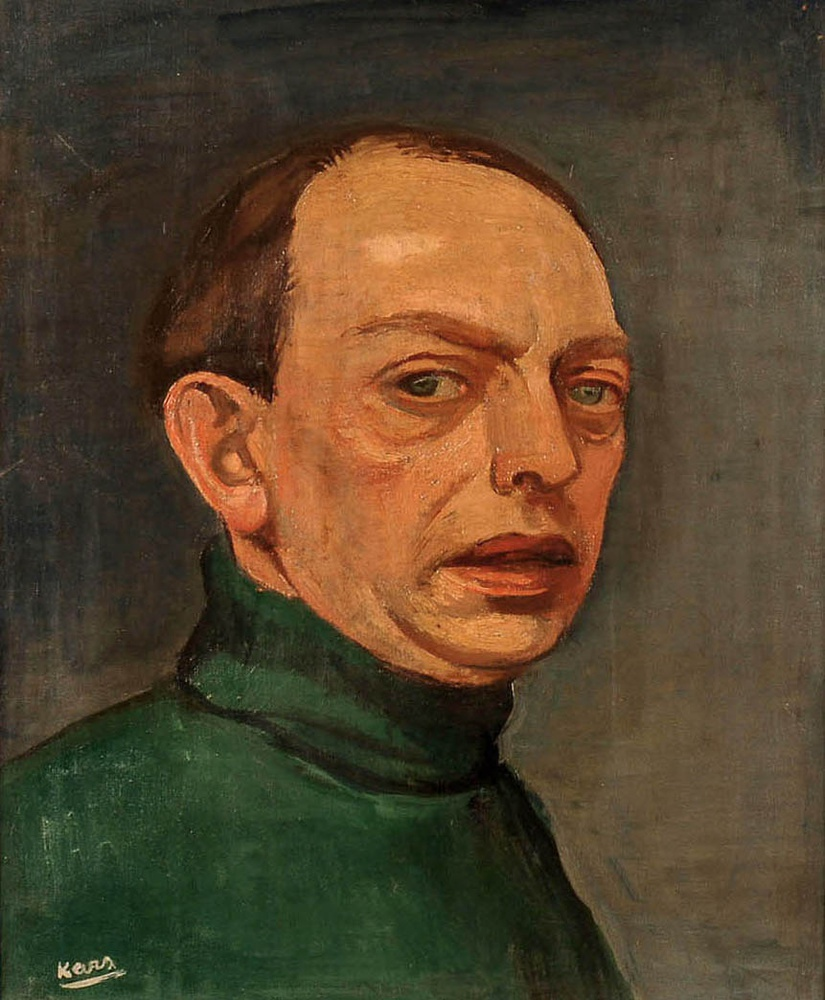
- Self-portrait, 1929 (Musée d'art moderne et contemporain de Strasbourg)
- Born: Kralupy, Bohemia, Austria-Hungary
- Died: 5 February 1945 (aged 62 or 64); Geneva, Switzerland
- Movement: School of Paris

Georges Kars (Georges Karpeles or Georg Karpeles - Jiří Karpeles) (2 May 1880, other sources 1882 – 5 February 1945) was a Czech painter, part of the School of Paris movement, known for his landscapes and nude paintings.

== Life ==
Georges Kars was born to a German Jewish family in Kralupy. His father was a miller. When he was 18, Kars was sent to study in art in Munich with Heinrich Knirr and Franz von Stuck. From 1905 he travelled to Madrid where he met Juan Gris and immersed himself in the painting styles of Velasquez and Goya. In 1908, Kars arrived in Paris and settled in Montmartre at the time of the Cubist revolution, which also had an influence on his work, and he met Suzanne Valadon and Maurice Utrillo. His work was interrupted by the First World War which he spent on the Galician Front and in Russian captivity. He renewed his friendship with Pascin and frequented Chagall, Apollinaire, Max Jacob, the art critic Maurice Raynal and the Greek painter Demetrius Galanis. He spent the summer of 1923 in Ségalas, Hautes-Pyrénées region, with Suzanne Valadon’s family.

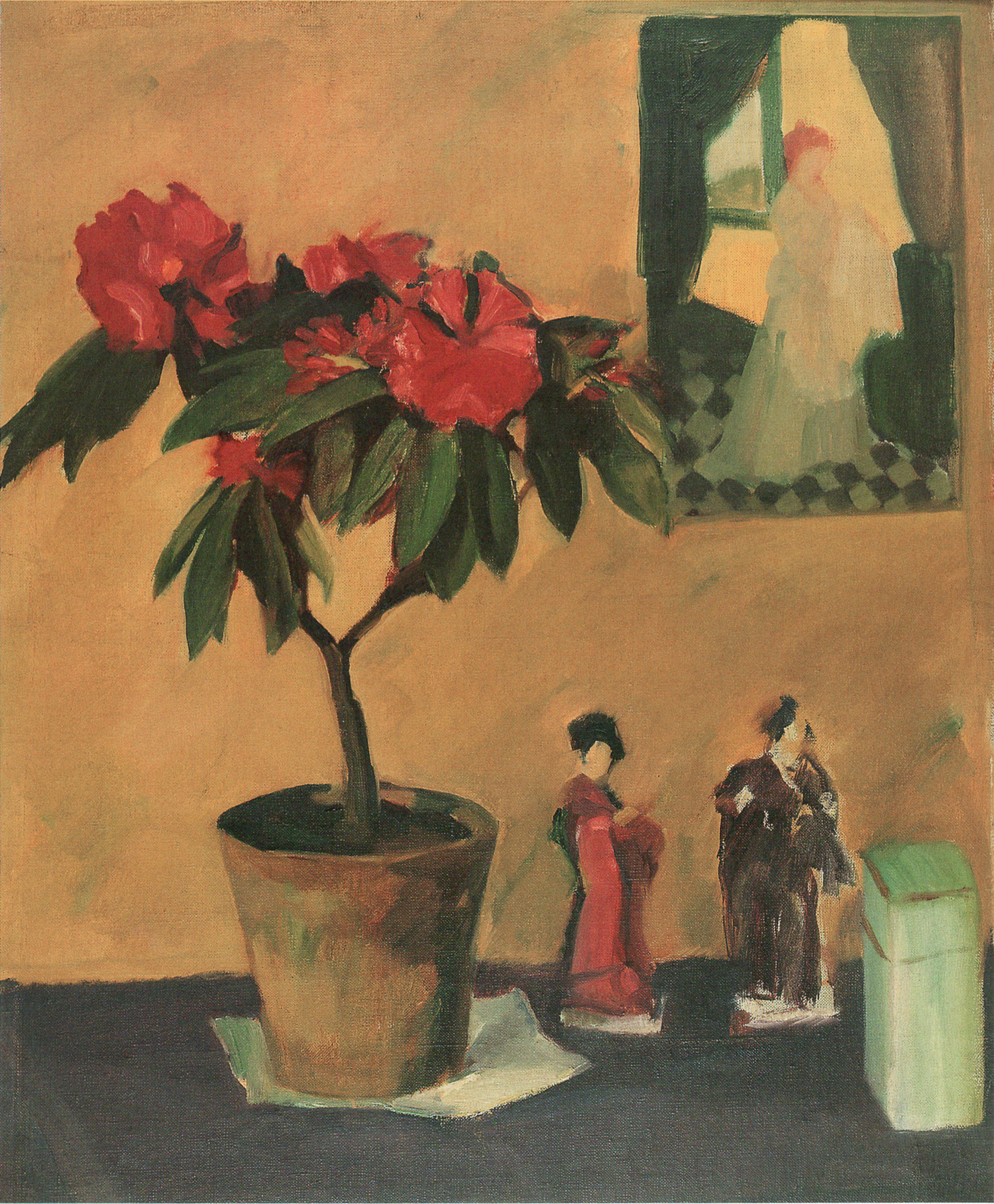
Still life with Japonaiserie, 1909

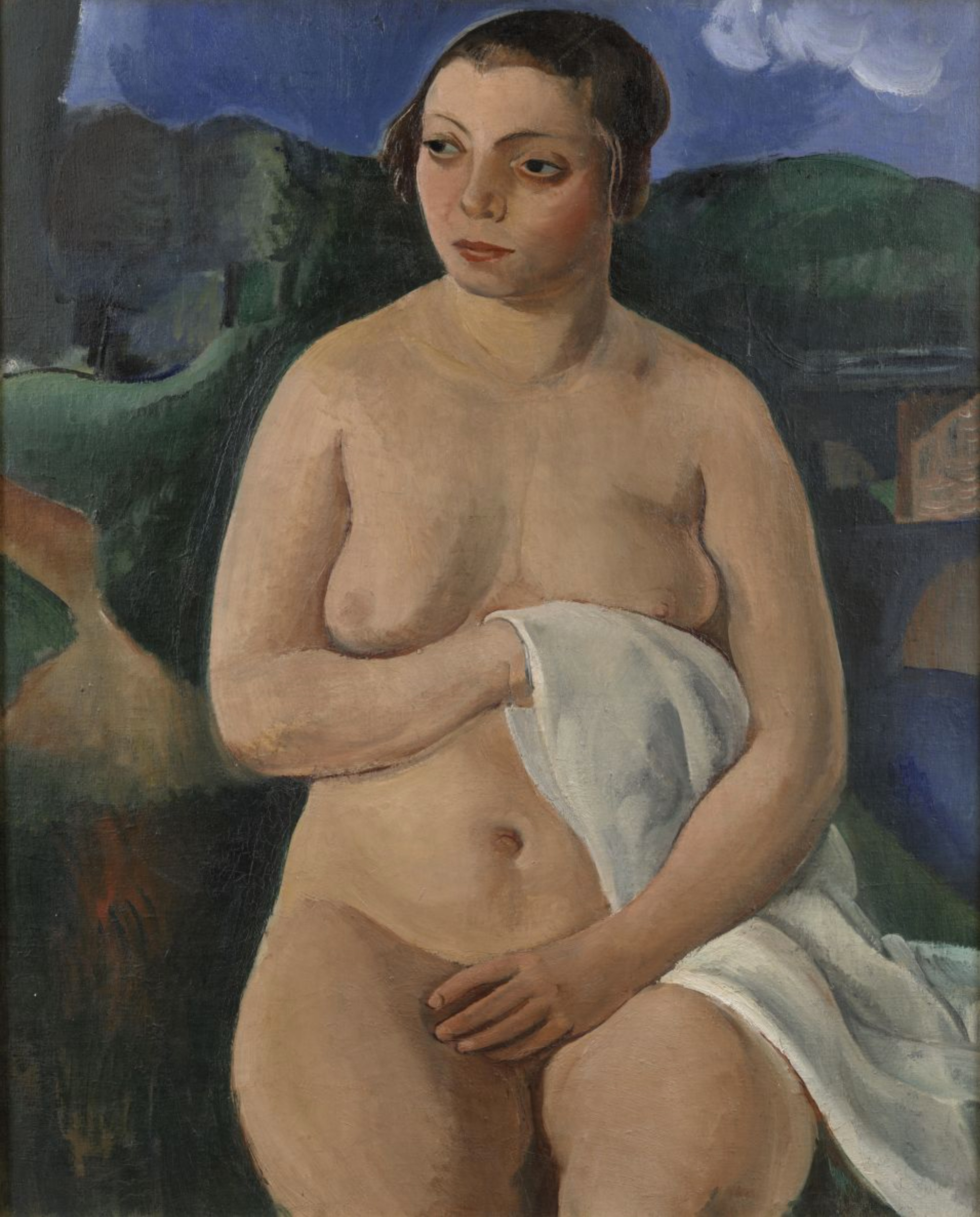
Nude in the countryside, 1926

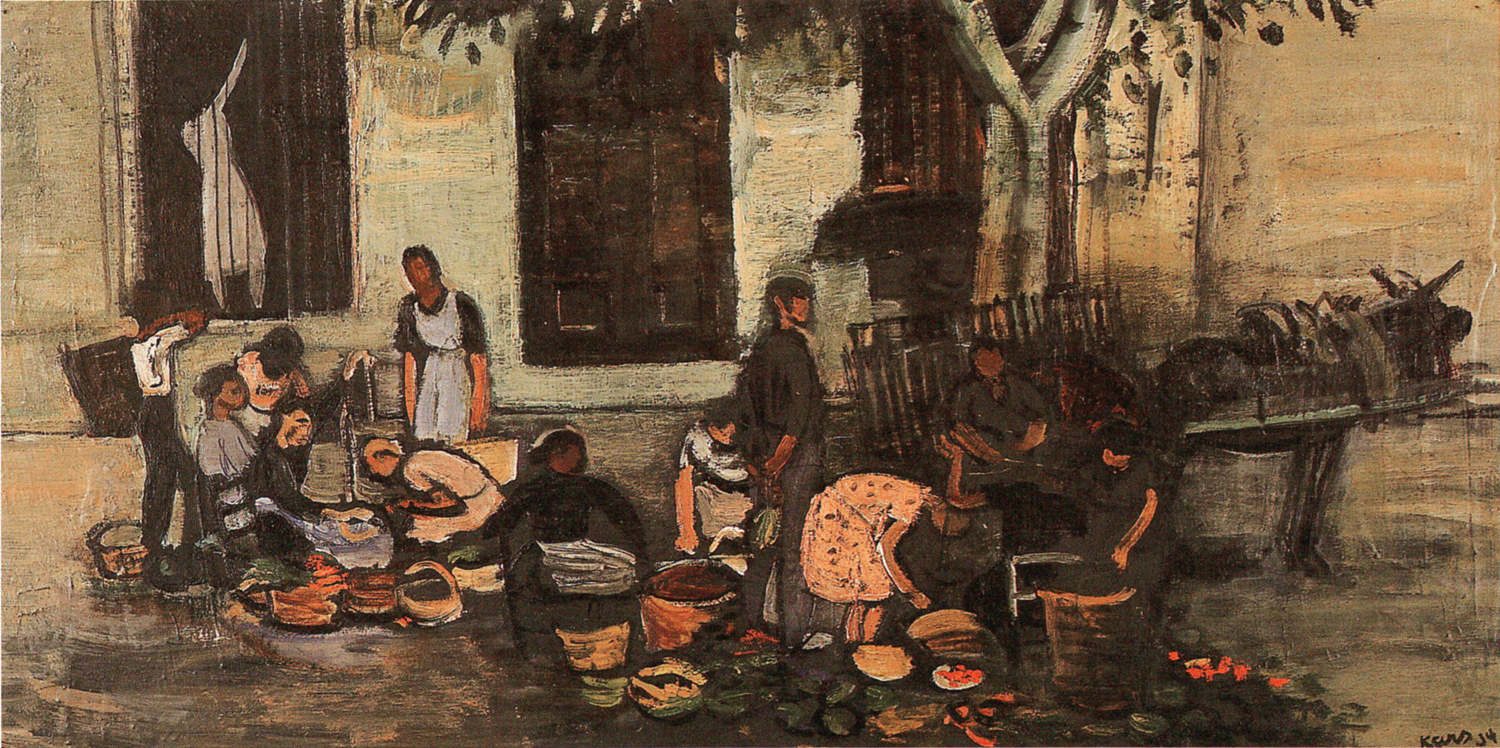
Market in Tosse del Mar, 1934

An exhibition of his work took place at the Berthe Weill gallery in 1928.

In 1933, he bought a house in Tossa de Mar near Barcelona. Along with a group of artists (Rafael Benet, Enric Casanovas and Alberto del Castillo) he inaugurated the Museu Municipal De Tossa Del Mar on 1 September 1935 as a modern art museum. He returned to live in Caulaincourt street in Montmartre, Paris, in 1936.

When World War II started and Germany occupied Paris, he took refuge in Lyon, where he started to draw children with a sad expression. In December 1942 he moved to the safety of his sister's home in Switzerland. Away from France, he made a large number of drawings and paintings depicting refugees seeking shelter. He committed suicide in Geneva on 5 February 1945, most likely after receiving news of the deaths of relatives.

Florent Fels, who met Georges Kars before 1930, writes:

Although I lived in the strangest environment of Montmartre, next to artists with the most twisted mind, Kars stands there, singularly well balanced. He is so witty that he could be a cousin of Hoffmann's. We always expect him, just like the magician from Königsberg to create a burlesque miracle like turning the Sacré-Coeur church into an illuminated pool for the One Thousand and One Nights or to create some tales worthy of The Serapion Brethren.

When his wife Nora died in 1966, the contents of his atelier were auctioned at the Palais Galliera in Paris. Pierre Levy, a French industrialist and art collector, and Oscar Ghez acquired an important part of the artworks. In 1983 the Modern Art Museum of Troyes staged the first Kars retrospective.

== Gallery ==
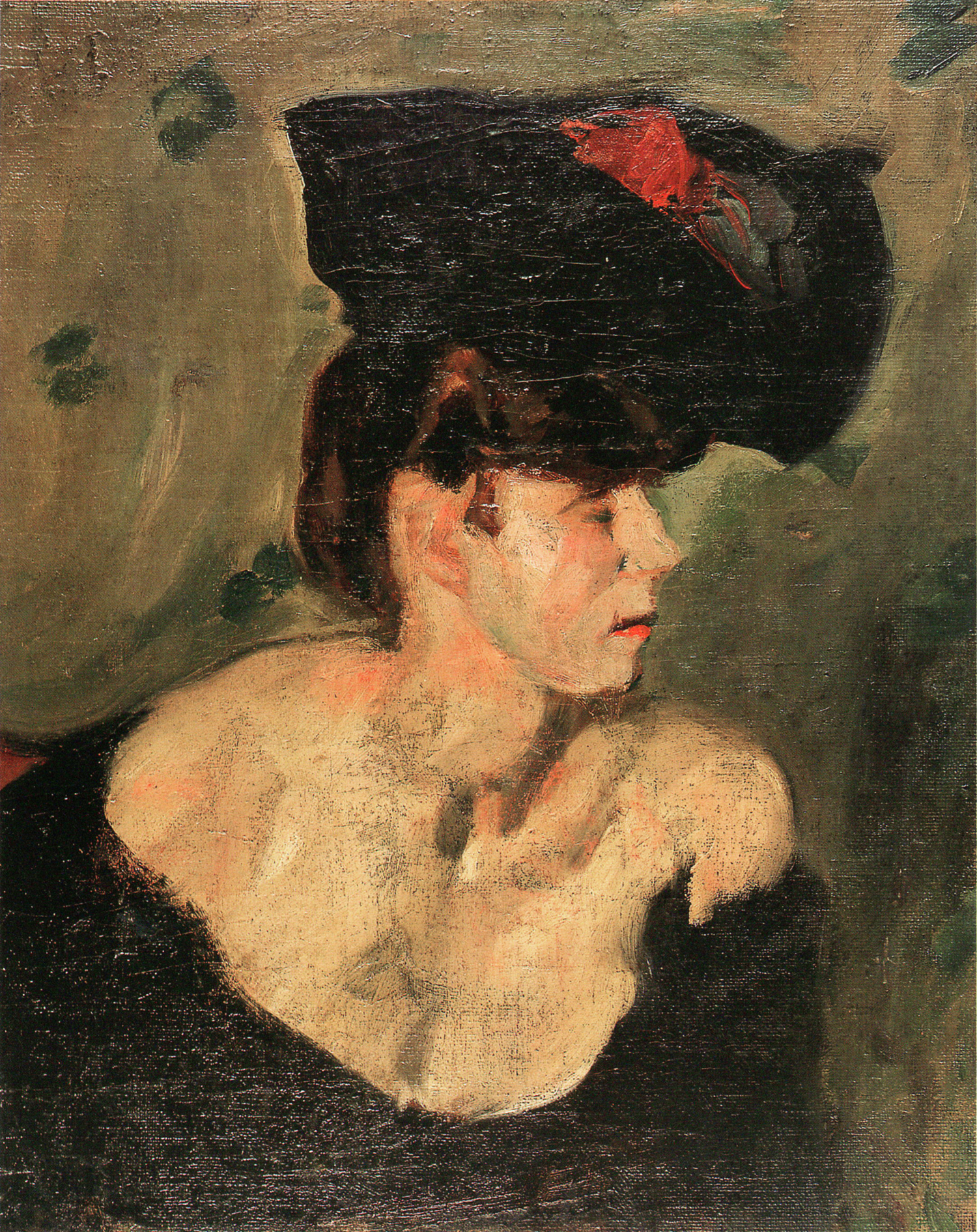
Portrait of a lady in a hat, 1908

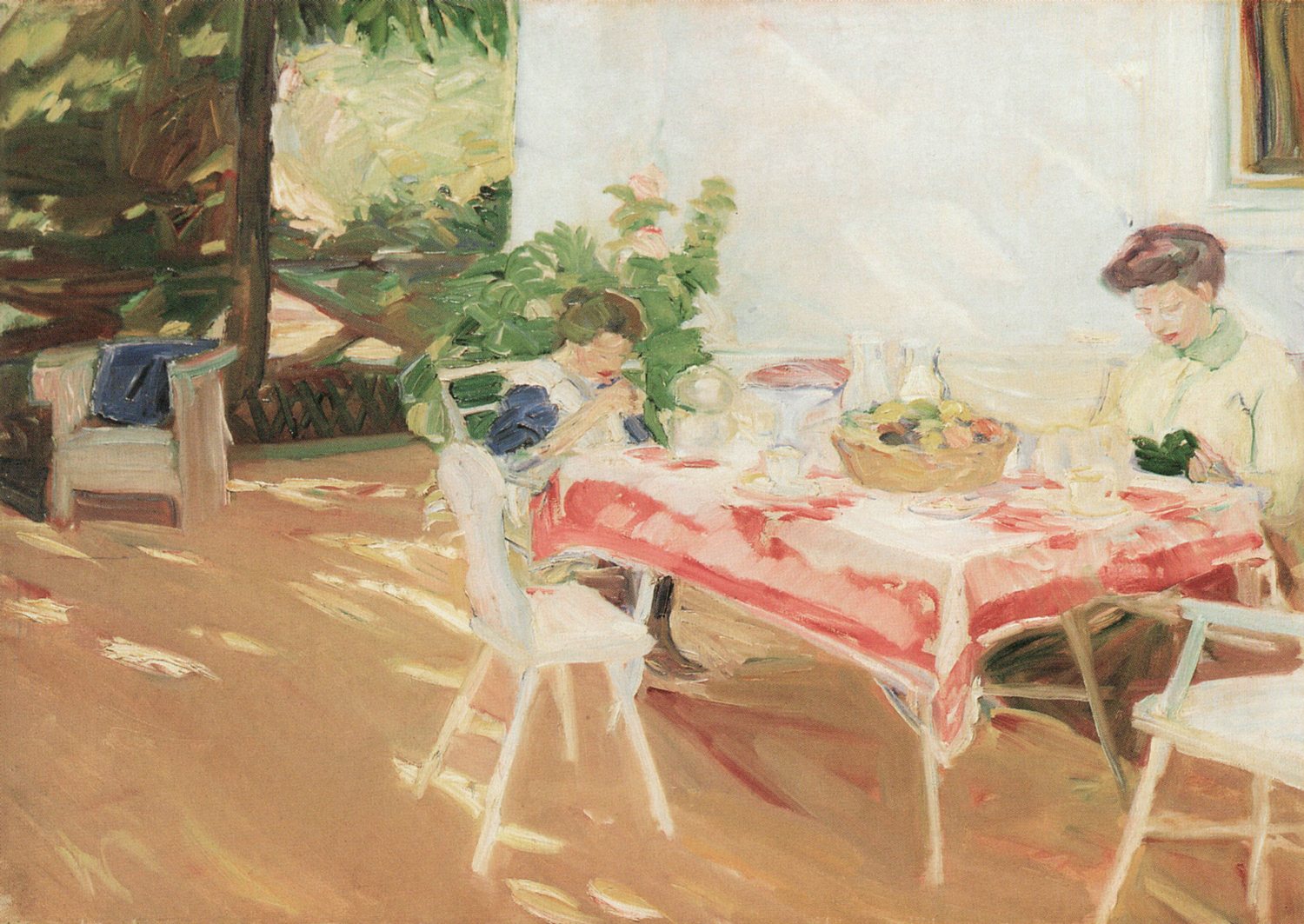
U svačiny, 1908

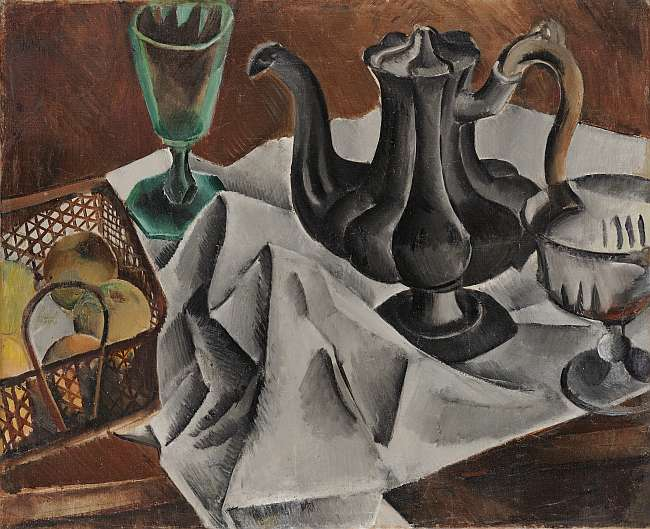
Still life with a green glass, 1914

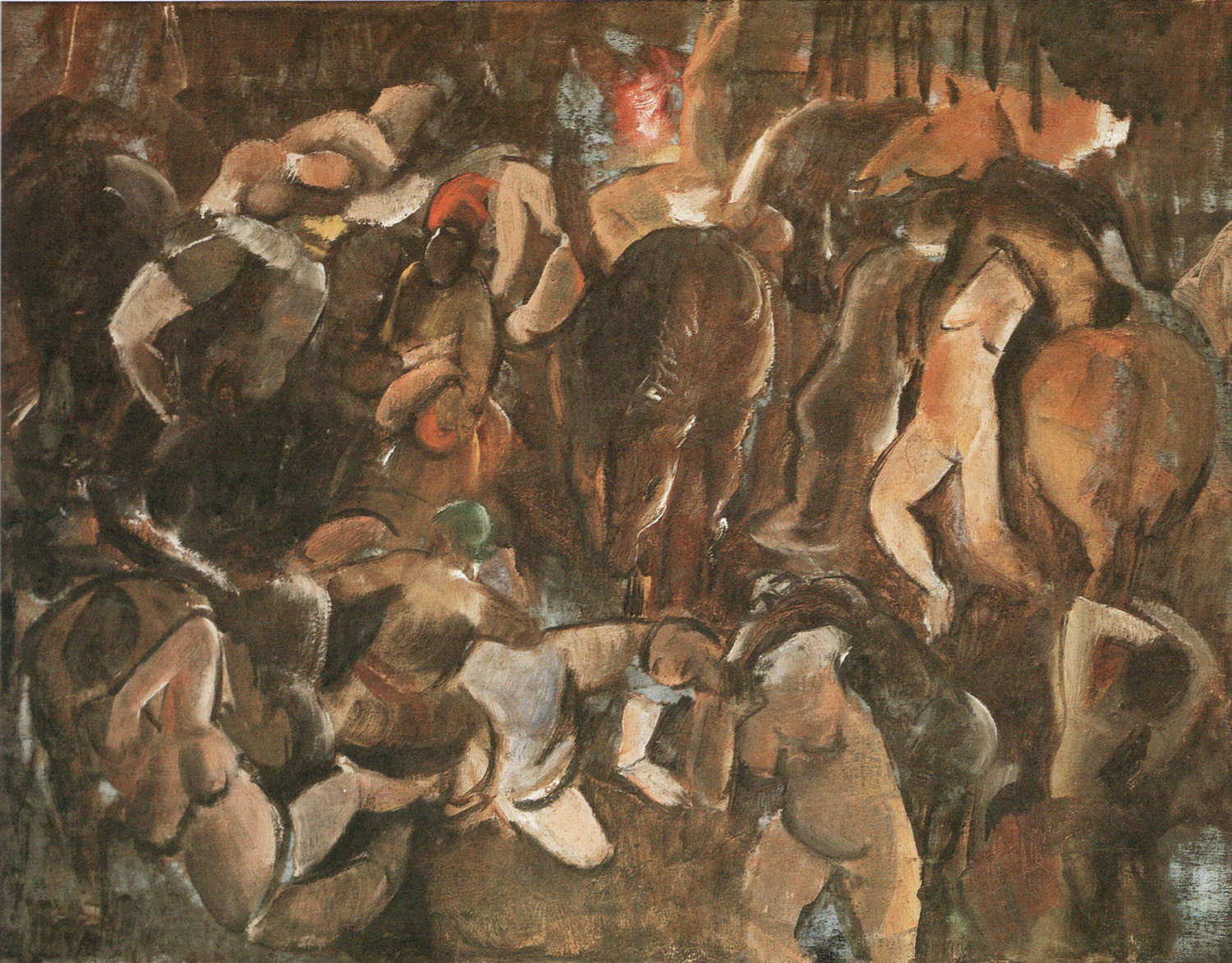
Nudes (Murder of Innocents, Abduction of Sabinek), 1919

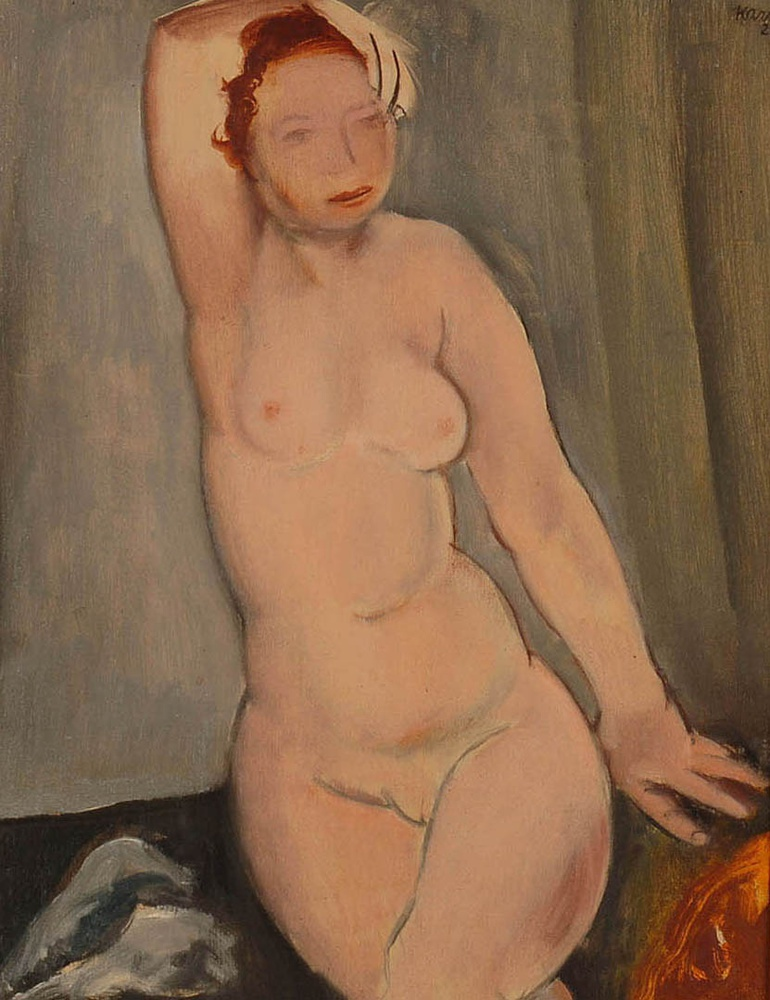
Seated Nude, 1921

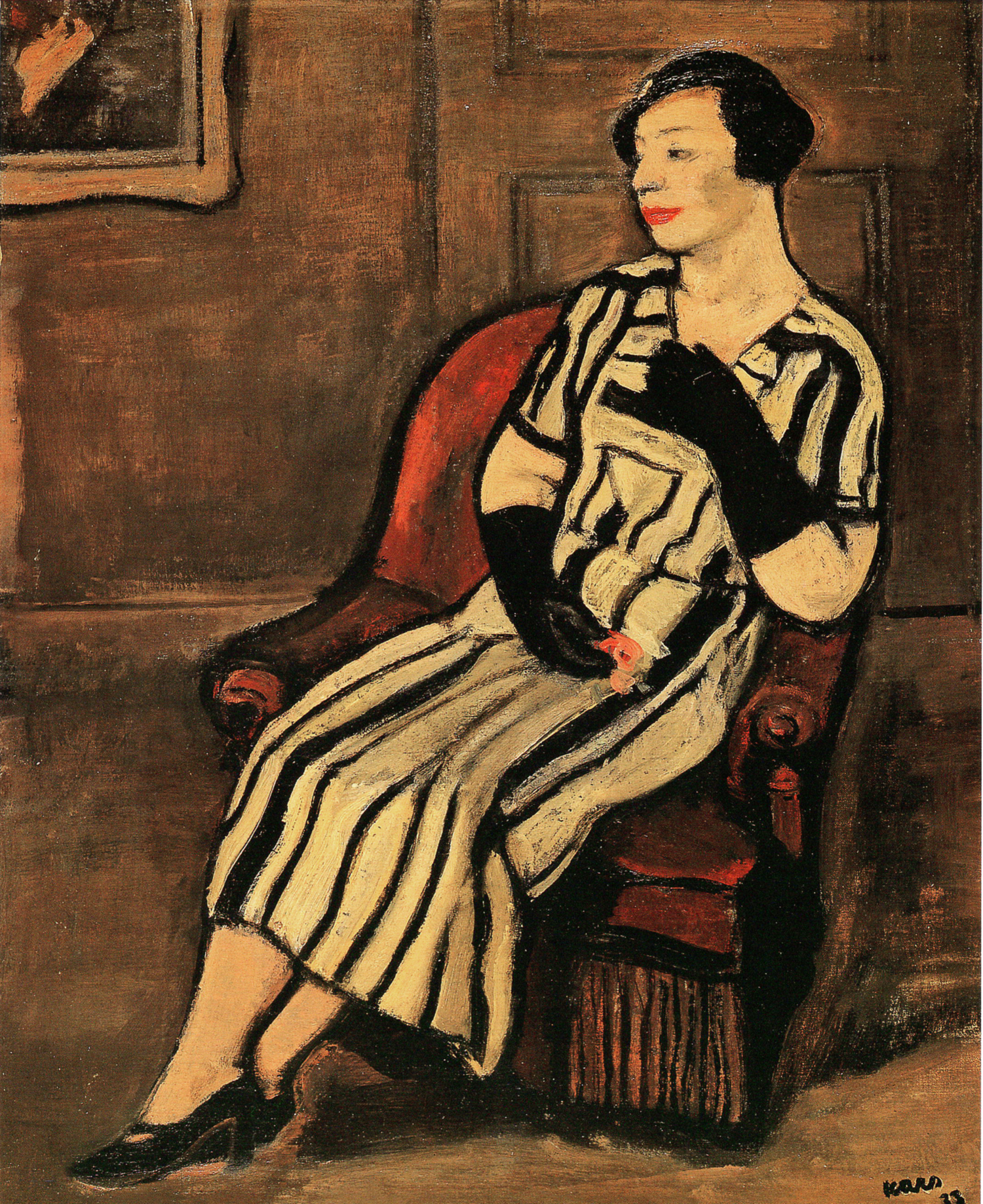
Portrait of Mrs. Suvičová - Black gloves, 1933

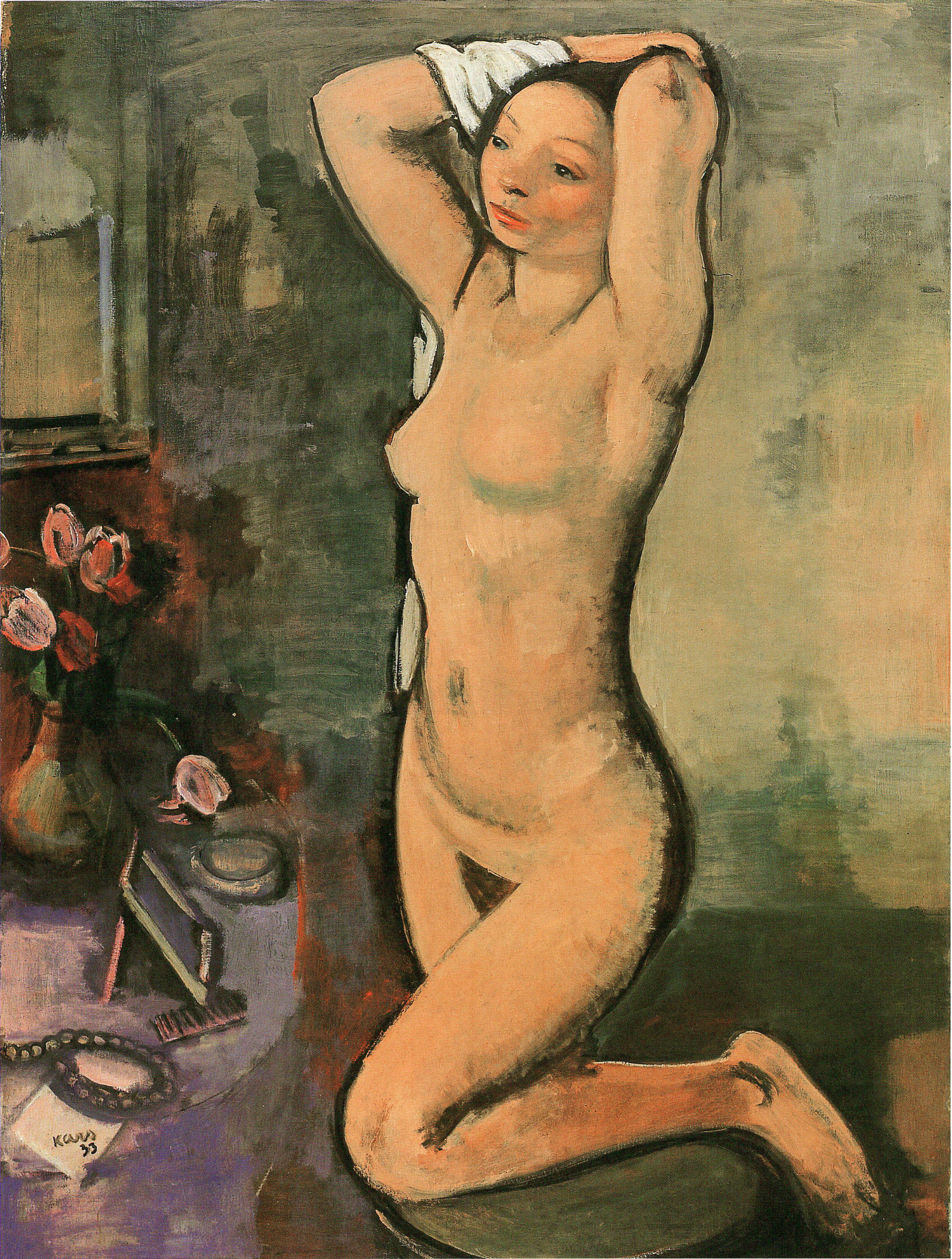
Ráno, 1933

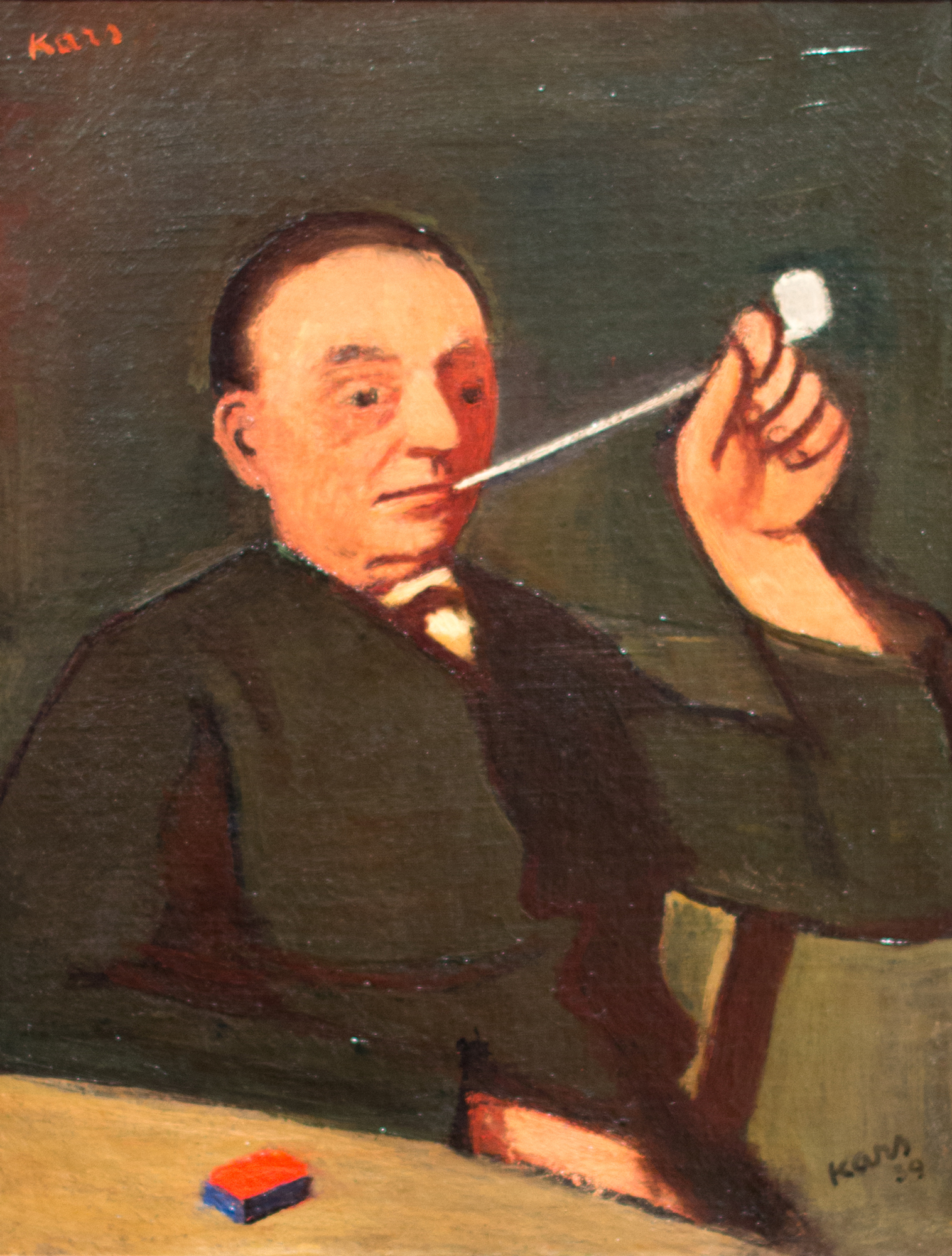
Self portrait, 1939

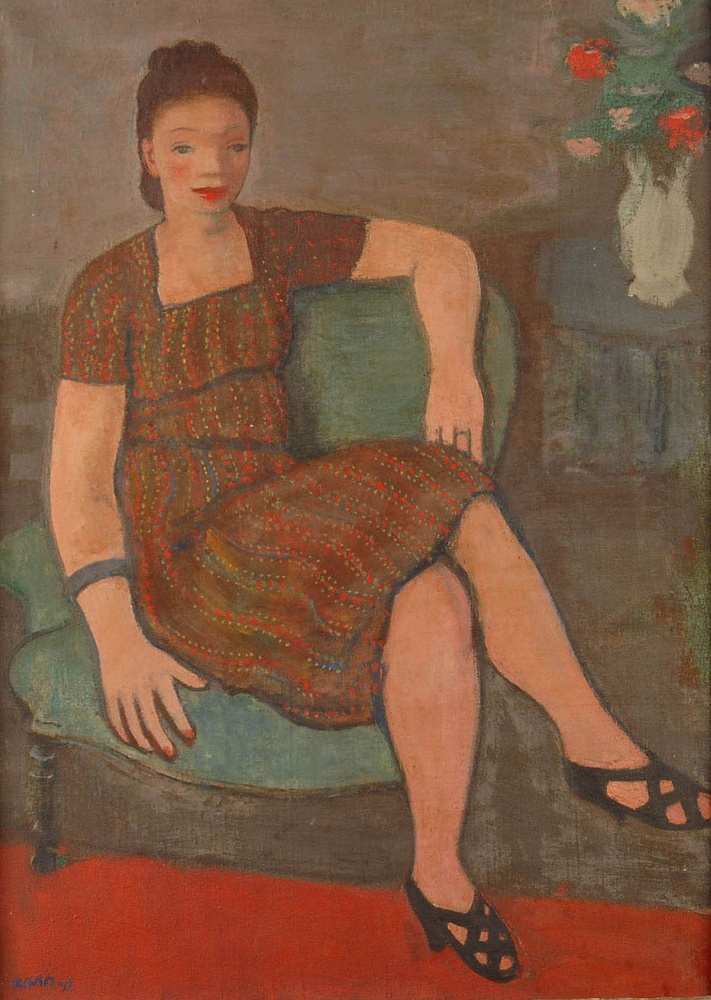
La robe pointillée, 1939

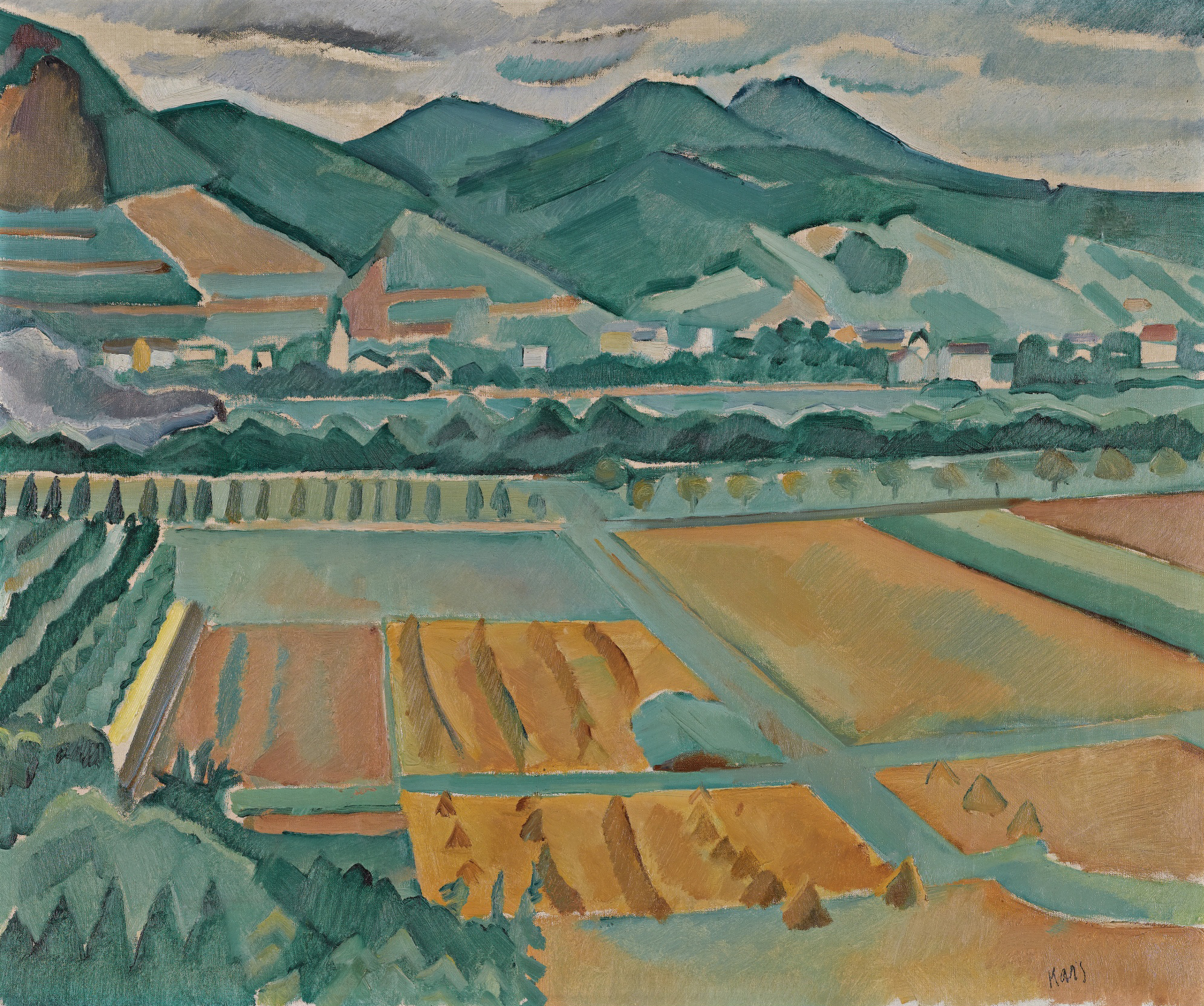
Landscape in Southern France
