= Vladislav Mirvald =

Czech artist (1921–2003)

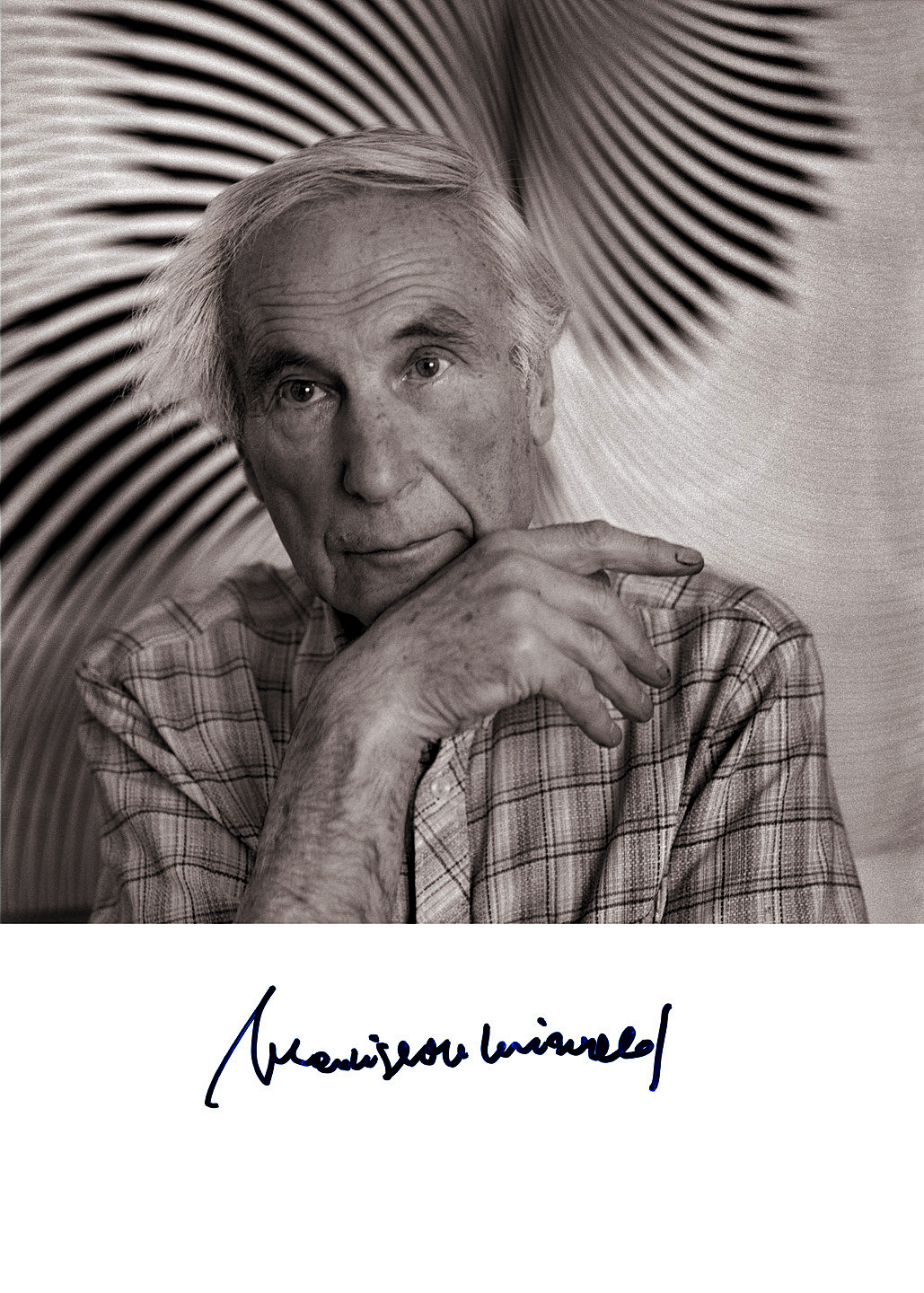
- Vladislav Mirvald
- Born: 3 August 1921; Záluží, Czechoslovakia
- Died: 19 April 2003 (aged 81); Louny, Czech Republic

Vladislav Mirvald (3 August 1921 – 19 April 2003) was a Czech painter.

A retrospective of his work was exhibited at Museum Kampa in Prague between 21 April 2015, and 6 July 2015.
