= Václav Rabas =

Czech painter (1885–1954)

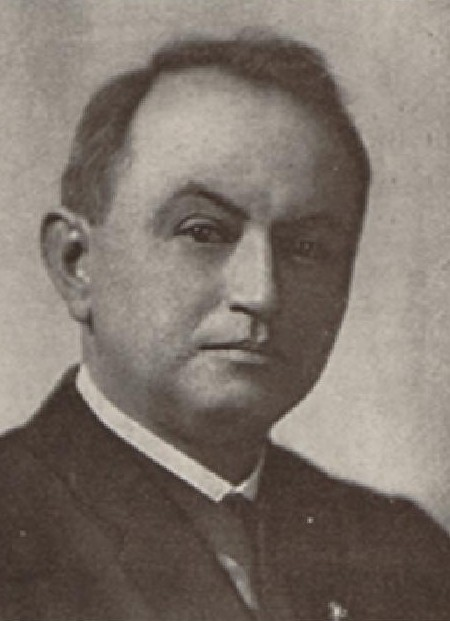
Václav Rabas

Václav Rabas (13 November 1885 in Krušovice – 26 October 1954 in Prague) was a Czech painter. He is among the most important modern Czech landscape painters.
