= Milan Knížák =

Czech artist, noise musician and political dissident (1940–2026)

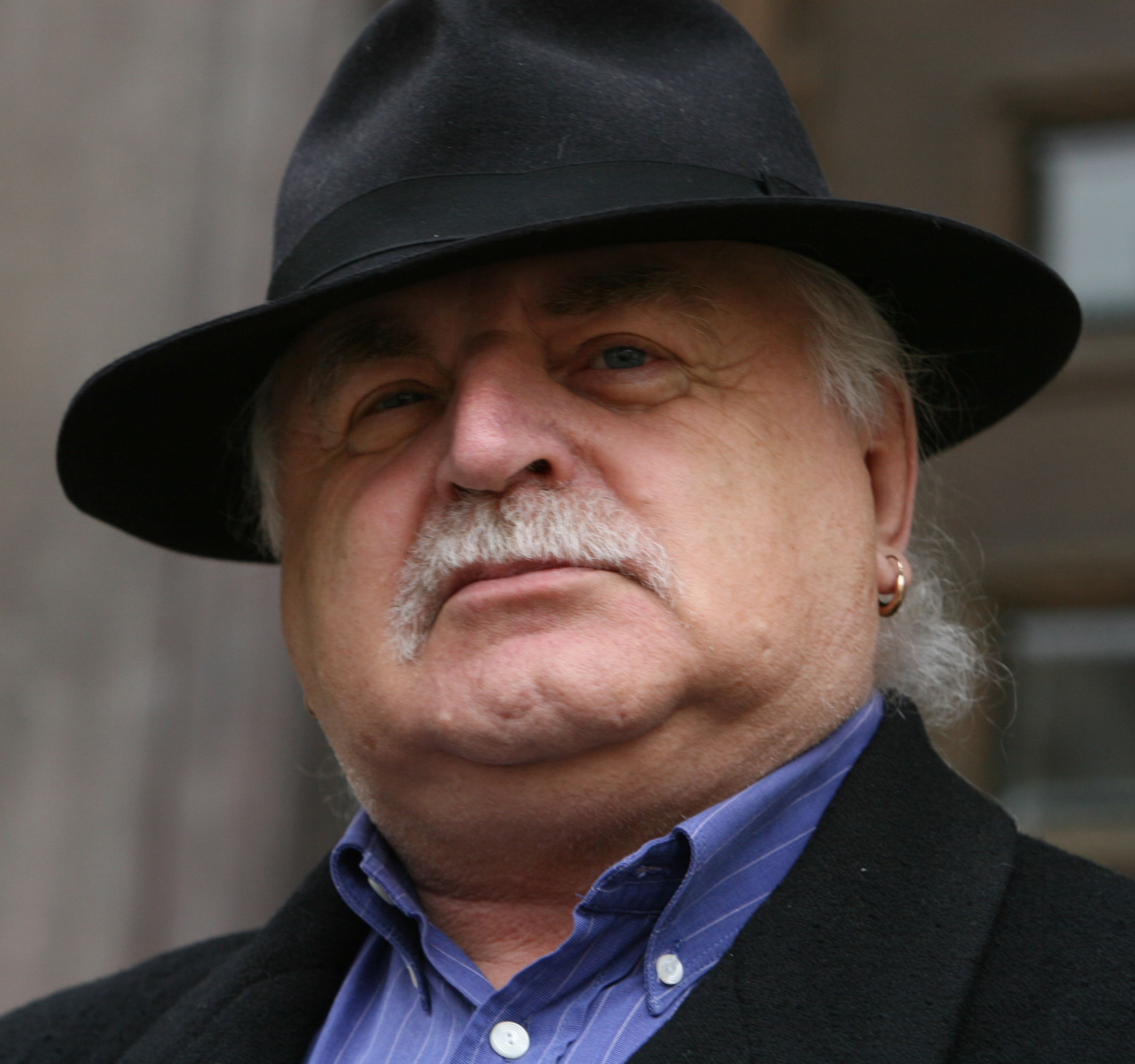
- Knížák in 2007
- Born: 19 April 1940; Plzeň, Protectorate of Bohemia and Moravia
- Died: 26 July 2026 (aged 86)
- Education: Academy of Fine Arts, Prague
- Known for: Performances, sculpture, visual art, aesthetics, art philosophy
- Awards: Recipient of the Medal of Merit

Milan Knížák (Czech: [ˈmɪlan ˈkɲiːʒaːk]; 19 April 1940 – 26 July 2026) was a Czech performance artist, sculptor, noise musician, installation artist, political dissident, graphic artist, art theorist and pedagogue of art. He was associated with Fluxus.

== Early life ==
Milan Knížák was the son of the painter, musician and teacher of mathematics Karel Knížák from Doubravka u Plzně, nowadays part of the city of Plzeň, and Julia Knížáková. His parents taught in Jarov (1932–1934) and later in Blovice near Plzeň. Milan Knížák was born in Plzeň on 19 April 1940. In 1945, after the expulsion of Germans from Czechoslovakia the family moved to Mariánské Lázně, a spa town close to the German border. There, his father played violin in a spa orchestra and Milan attended primary school, where he was interested in music and literature. He also took piano, trumpet, and guitar lessons.

== Studies and beginnings (1955–1965) ==
Knížák started painting at fourteen in Mariánské Lázně where his first exhibition was held in 1958. He attended secondary school (Gymnasium in Planá) and graduated in 1957. On several occasions young Knížák visited the studio of the painter Vladimír Modrý (1907–1976). Later Knížák wrote in his diary about the movie Fantastic Voyage and how its fantastic scenes reminded him of the paintings of Modrý. During the period of mid-1957 to 1958 he attended the Pedagogical University in Prague, majoring in art education and Russian language. In 1958 he dropped out and became an assistant worker at Prague's exhibition grounds. He later passed the exams at the Academy of Fine Arts in Prague, but soon abandoned his studies there. He then studied mathematical analysis at the Faculty of Mathematics and Physics, Charles University for one year.

== Actual and public art (1960–1975) ==
At the beginning of the 1960s, he created his first activity – happenings, ceremonies, installations, and various environments on the busy or calm streets or in courtyards of Prague.

Together with his friends he founded a contemporary art group called Actual Art. Sometime around 1966 the word "art" was dropped from the name and group was called poor AKTUAL. Already known and also documented are their actions in the part of old [Prague called New World, such as Demonstration of One (1964). Some of AKTUAL's songs were remastered by unofficial musical group The Plastic People of the Universe, in the guise of which members became, somewhat against their will, dissidents during political process in the autumn of the year 1976.

Knížák was a member of Fluxus, an international (anti-)artistic community of music, actions, poetry, objects, and events. Knížák was director of Fluxus East from the year 1965. He is known for having organized and performed in the first happening s and noise music concerts in Czechoslovakia: e.g. A Walk around Novy Svět (The part of old Prague called New World) and the Demonstration for Oneself (both 1964). Later he had contacts with the first contact mediated Czech philosopher Jindřich Chalupecký. Knížák was promoted to Director Fluxus East by director George Maciunas around 1965. And from there were managed he Fluxus festivals in the countries of the Eastern Bloc Thetein these events included events in Vilnius (1966), [Prague (1966), Budapest (1969), and Poznań (1977). Knížák was also visited by American beatnik poet Allen Ginsberg and conceptual art artist Joseph Kosuth.

George Maciunas invited Knížák to the United States in 1965 and he participated in Fluxus events there. He realized his Lying Ceremony in New Brunswick, New Jersey and the Difficult Ceremony in New York City. Maciunas prepared the publication of Knížák's Collected Works as a Fluxus Edition.

In October 1966, Knížák organised the first Fluxus concert in Czechoslovakia in Prague in which he appeared together with Ben Vautier, Jeff Berner, Alison Knowles, Serge Oldenbourg, and Dick Higgins.

Knížák returned to Czechoslovakia in 1970. His works were exhibited in the galleries in the East bloc, f.e. Kraków in Poland, Budapest in Hungary, but also in capitalistic Austria. In 1979 he received a fellowship from the DAAD to West Berlin, where he meet artist Wolf Vostell and Czech poet in emigration Jiří Kolář. In West Berlin he worked as a designer on an avant-garde film and created the automobile cycle of collages for Volkswagen.

== Political activities ==
During the communist era Knížák was under police surveillance and was called an Enemy of the State. He was arrested during an event with the music band The Plastic People of the Universe.

== Death ==
Knížák died on 26 July 2026, at the age of 86.

== Awards and positions ==
In 1998 Knížák unsuccessfully ran for the Senate as an independent, supported by the ODS. In 2010 he was awarded the Medal of Merit by the Czech Republic. Knížák was director of the Czech National Gallery in Prague between 1999 and 2011.

== Pedagogy ==
Knížák was a professor of intermedia at the Academy of Fine Arts in Prague from 1990. His pupils have included Jana Šindelová.

- 1998: École cantonale d'art de Lausanne (ECAL), Lausanne, Switzerland – lectures, lecture on history of performance art
- 1997: Centre Georges Pompidou, Domaine de Boisbuchet, France – extension and pedagogy
- 1991, 1992: Vitra Museum, Weil am Rhein, BRD – lectures
- 1991: Sommerakademie Berlin, BRD – pedagogy
- 1990–1997: Academy of Fine Arts in Prague, chancellor and professor of intermedia
- since 1989: professor of intermedia at the Academy of Fine Arts in Prague
- 1987, 1990, 1993, 1996: Inter. Sommerakademie Salzburg, Rakousko – pedagogy and lectures
- 1983: HfBK Hamburg, BRD – lectures on art
- 1969: University of Kentucky, Lexington, USA + UCLA, Los Angeles, USA – lectures on performance art

== Awards ==
- 1997: Medal of first instance of the Ministry of Education
- 2010: He became the holder of the Medal of Merit

== Selected Knížák Fluxus Event Specification ==
- 1965: Fashion specification: Cut a coat along its entire length. Wear each half separately.
- 1965: Cat specification: Get a cat.
- 1965–1970: Killing the Books specification: By shooting, by burning, by drowning, by cutting, by gluing, by painting white, or red, or black...
- 1968: Lying Ceremony specification: Blindfolded people lie on the ground for a long time.
