= Jindřich Chalupecký =

Czech art historian, literary theorist and translator (1910–1990)

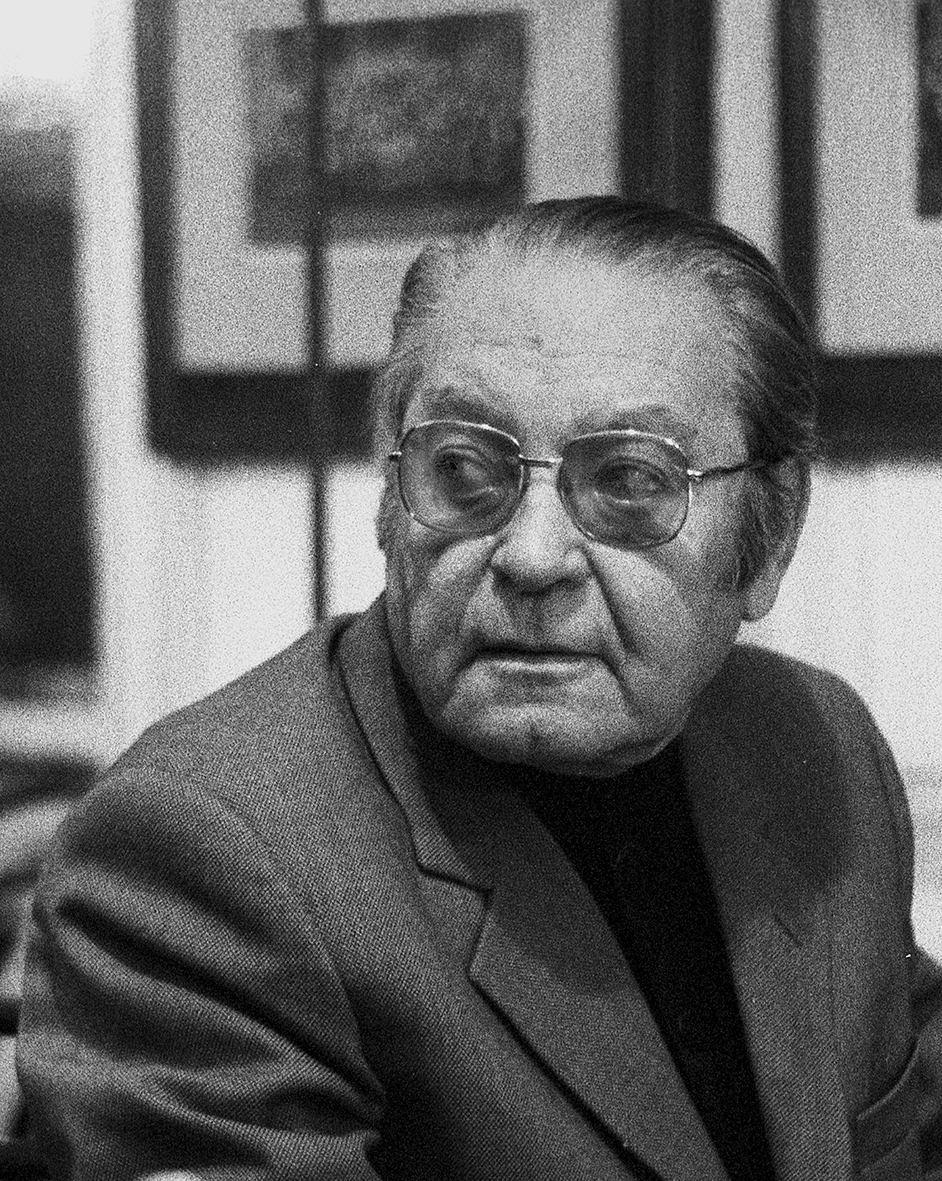
- Chalupecký in the 1980s
- Born: 12 February 1910; Prague, Bohemia, Austria-Hungary
- Died: 19 June 1990 (aged 80); Prague, Czechoslovakia
- Education: Faculty of Arts, Charles University
- Occupations: Art and literary critic, essayist, art historian, translator
- Spouse: Jiřina Hauková
- Awards: Order of Tomáš Garrigue Masaryk, in memoriam

Jindřich Chalupecký (12 February 1910 – 19 June 1990) was a Czech art and literary theorist and critic, essayist, art historian, and translator. He was the husband of poet Jiřina Hauková.

== Life ==
=== 1910–1948 ===
Jindřich Chalupecký was born on 12 February 1910 in Prague. His father was a university professor of ophthalmology, author of books such as Heinrich Heine and The Music of Colors. His father died of infectious hepatitis when Jindřich was eight years old, and his mother remarried to his father's assistant, Kamil Fiala. Fiala also worked as a translator from English and French and as a music and literary critic for the magazine Modern revue.

Chalupecký became interested in art while studying at the gymnasium on Křemencova Street in Prague. From 1928 to 1932, he studied pedagogy, psychology, literature, French and history of art at the Faculty of Arts, Charles University. He attended lectures by Jan Mukařovský, but found no connection between aesthetics as a scientific discipline and the meaning and place of art in the contemporary world. He did not complete his studies.

He made his debut in 1930 with articles in the weekly Čin (Action) and the magazines Lumír, Blok, Přítomnost, Listy pro umění a kritiku. He was a teacher and director of a business school, where the painter Zdenek Rykr also worked. In pre-war Czechoslovakia, he was one of the left-wing intellectuals and, in addition to publishing in literary magazines and newspapers, he was a theorist of Group 42, which began to form in the 1930s. In 1934, he spent several weeks in Paris, where he befriended František Gross and František Hudeček and curated an exhibition of his friend Zdenek Rykr. In 1935, he married Alžběta Dubitzská, but the couple divorced after the war in 1946.

During World War II, he was a member of the illegal "Artistic Five" of the National Revolutionary Committee of Intellectuals. In 1942, he was editor of the magazine Život ('Life') published by Umělecká beseda, and after the war he was briefly secretary of the newly founded Block (Syndicate) of Visual Artists. From 1946 to 1948 he was editor-in-chief of the quarterly magazine Listy ('Pages' for art and philosophy), and from 1946 to 1949 he was a member of the committee of the literary department of the Umělecká beseda. In 1944, the UB's Fine Arts Department published his study The Meaning of Fine Arts. In 1948, he was a member of the State Publishing Commission, and from 1948 to 1949, he was a member of the Syndicate of Czech Writers and secretary of the Art Council of the Union of Czechoslovak Fine Artists.

=== 1948–1968 ===
After the 1948 Czechoslovak coup d'état, he was labeled a proponent of "decadent art" and lost the opportunity to publish. In 1949, his article Intellectuals under Socialism was published anonymously, abroad describing the cultural wasteland at the very beginning of communist rule. He took a job in the exhibition department of ÚLUV (Center of Folk Art Production), from where he moved to the Textilní tvorba (Textile design) company, and from 1959 he was head of the theoretical department of the Institute of Housing and Clothing Culture in Prague (ÚBOK). Textile art was not subject to ideological supervision by the Communist Party, and Chalupecký was able to travel to exhibitions abroad and had access to books and catalogs of modern art. He made a number of new friends among the younger generation of artists who opposed the aesthetic dogmas of socialist realism.

In the 1960s, he retired with the intention of reviewing art, but in the relaxed atmosphere of the mid-decade, he ended up participating in the revolutionary events in the art world. At the 1964 congress of the Union of Czechoslovak Visual Artists, which dismissed the former dogmatic leadership, he was elected a member of the presidium and became a member of the International Association of Art Critics. He was chairman of the editorial board of the magazine Výtvarná práce (Fine Arts) and the Obelisk publishing house, and from 1965 to 1970 he was curator of the Václav Špála Gallery in Prague. Under his leadership, the gallery became a center for exhibitions of Czech modern art. Thanks to Chalupecký, many artists from the generation that emerged at the turn of the 1950s and 1960s exhibited there for the first time. The first Czech exhibition of Marcel Duchamp and the Japanese Gutai group also took place there. In 1967, he received the Antonín Matějček Award by the Union of Czechoslovak visual artists.

In 1966, he organized an exhibition of Czech modern art entitled "Tschechoslowakische Kunst der Gegenwart" in Berlin, in 1967 "17 tsjechische kunstenaars" in The Hague, and in 1968 the exhibition "Arte contemporanea in Cecoslovacchia," which took place in 1969 at the Galleria Nazionale d'Arte in Rome.

=== 1968–1990 ===
After the occupation of Czechoslovakia in August 1968, he was gradually removed from all his positions. After the publication of the article "All Power to the Workers' Councils", which emerged at the very end of the 1960s and called for the destruction of the "tradition of passivity" and a revolution that would pave the way for pluralism, he was again banned from publishing. He was last allowed to travel abroad in 1969 as a juror at the International Exhibition of Modern Art in Paris. Under the pretext of reconstruction, the Václav Špála Gallery was closed in 1970. In 1970, Chalupecký held two more exhibitions entitled Confrontation in the substitute space of the Galerie Nova at Voršilská Street. The second exhibition was closed the day after it opened under the pretext of heating repairs and he then retired permanently. In the early 1970s, he was able to travel to Moscow, where he followed the activities of local avant-garde artists (Kabakov, Pivovarov, Bulatov, Steinberg, and others). Since 1969, Chalupecký cooperated on exhibitions with Schwarz Gallery in Milan (František Janoušek, 1969, Jiří Kolář, 1972, Ladislav Novák, 1974) and with Baruch Gallery in Chicago (Jiří Balcar, 1979).

During normalization in the 1970s and 1980s, he was not allowed to work publicly. He collaborated with the unofficial club Jazz Section and samizdat editions Petlice and Kritický sborník (Critical collection). Some of his articles were published abroad in the 1970s and 1980s in foreign magazines Flash Art, Data, Opus International, Studio International, Art Monthly and Artibus et Historiae, where he wrote regular reviews of events on the Czech art scene and in other countries of the Soviet bloc.

In 1978, he was asked to write a chapter on contemporary art in the USSR, Poland, and Czechoslovakia for an overview of art history published by the Berlin publishing house Ullstein Verlag. After 1980, he also wrote for the exile magazines Rozmluvy (London), Proměny and Cross-Currents. He maintained contact with the generation of artists of the 1960s, who created in private without the possibility of exhibiting. Between 1983 and 1988, he regularly met with a generation of artists who had graduated in the 1970s and had also become inconvenient for the regime, at the studio of Petr Pavlík. In 1988, Chalupecký participated in the founding of the New Group – a select association of artists, architects, and theorists that met in the hall of Prague's Hlahol Choir, opposite to Mánes Union of Fine Arts.

After the fall of the communist regime, Chalupecký was already seriously ill and dependent on hemodialysis. On the initiative of Jiří Kolář, a public collection of works of art was organized at the end of 1989, the auction of which was to raise funds for the purchase of a hemodialysis machine. The machine was eventually purchased by the Charter 77 Foundation. The donations were used to organize an exhibition entitled "Tribute to Jindřich Chalupecký" (16–28 January 1990), and the paintings became part of the collection of the Jan and Meda Mládek Foundation in Museum Kampa. Chalupecký died on 19 June 1990. He is buried at the Olšany Cemetery in Prague.

A selection of essays by Chalupecký, Cestou necestou / By hook or by crook (1934–1989), was prepared for samizdat publication in the late 1980s, but was revised several times until February 1990, when it was first taken on by the Odeon publishing house, which, however, ceased to exist shortly thereafter. This delayed the publication, and Chalupecký's selected works were not finally published until 1999 by H&H Publishing.

In 2014, the city of Prague named one of its parks after Chalupecký and Jiřina Hauková.

=== Awards ===
- 1967 Antonín Matějček Award
- 1991 Order of Tomáš Garrigue Masaryk in memoriam, III. class (1991)

At the end of his life, Chalupecký agreed that a prize would be awarded in his name to young artists. The prize was initiated by Theodor Pištěk, together with Václav Havel and Jiří Kolář. The Jindřich Chalupecký Award, presented by the Jindřich Chalupecký Society, is the most prestigious award that a Czech artist under the age of 35 can receive.

== Work ==
Chalupecký knew and commented on art from close up, almost from the inside, but without overemphasizing it, he drew on his deep knowledge of philosophy, history, and broader cultural and scientific contexts. He engaged in long discussions with artists, poets, and writers. Visits to their studios and workrooms allowed him to observe their work from an immediate proximity. He was probably the most influential figure in Czech art theory in the second half of the 20th century, a man of strong character, with knowledge spanning a number of fields, who wrote about art in a way that is difficult to imitate and has yet to be surpassed. He himself believed that the purpose of the work of an art critic was not to classify the present in history, but to find words for what vaguely occupies the minds of artists, thereby contributing to the creation of a spiritual environment for them and for those who encounter their work.

During the war, in February 1940, he wrote an essay entitled "The World We Live In," which was published at the request of Vladimír Holan in E.F. Burian Theater Magazine Program D 40 and later became a kind of programmatic manifesto for Group 42. The manifesto ends with these words:

Art discovers reality, creates reality, reveals reality, the world in which we live, and us who live in it. For the theme, meaning, and purpose of art is nothing other than the everyday, terrifying, and glorious drama of man and reality: the drama of mystery facing miracle. If modern art is incapable of this, it will be useless.

In his last article in the quarterly Listy, which was banned by the communist regime in 1948, he reflects on the mission of the artist. "Art cannot serve political tasks because its mission is to be truthful."

Chalupecký was primarily concerned with contemporary visual art. He was troubled by the question of modern society's relationship to visual art and the question of the definition and boundaries of contemporary art, such as the legitimacy of performance art as a visual art form. He summarized these reflections in his book Na hranicích umění (On the Frontiers of Art). For the younger generation, Chalupecký represented a silenced spokesperson for free artistic thought, who in his reflections questioned the apparent certainties of artistic tradition while also passing on information about current events in the world. His courage to seek out untried methods and forms of expression through which art can respond to external circumstances and the inner life of contemporary man was inspiring. He was intimately familiar with the work of artists, whom he visited in their studios, and he also paid attention to solitary figures outside the art scene, such as Vladimír Boudník.

His book dedicated to Marcel Duchamp and entitled The Fate of the Artist – Duchampian Meditations, was published posthumously in 1998. In it, he reflects on the historical milestone represented by Duchamp's radical shift from traditional painting to his "ready-mades" and the transition from the decorative function of a work of art to a work that has become a sign. According to Chalupecký, "art is a bridge that connects what is here and now with what is nowhere and never."

Chalupecký was demanding of himself, and his stubbornness and uncompromising judgments made him unpleasant to many. He consistently favored exploratory and nonconformist creative acts and was able to recognize art that transcended the limitations of the local environment. His legacy is a belief in the spiritual dimension of art, through which it contributes to the humanization of the world. In his reflection on human awareness of the world, he wrote: "Realizing, preserving, and communicating this awareness is the purpose of art. The intoxication and dazzlement we call beauty, the special strength that art gives us, even the happiness we experience through it, is most likely the feeling that we have momentarily attained that totality of being in our consciousness."

=== Selected bibliography ===
- Smysl moderního umění / The Meaning of Modern Art, Art department of Umělecká beseda, Prague 1944
- Veliká příležitost – poznámky k reorganisaci českého výtvarnictví / A Great Opportunity – Notes on the Reorganization of Czech Art, Art department of Umělecká beseda, Prague 1946
- Kultura a lid / Culture and People, Družstvo Dílo přátel umění a knihy; Živé dokumenty. Malá řada; vol. 3., 1947
- Richard Weiner, Štorch-Marien, Aventinum, Prague 1947
- Mostra d´arte contemporanea cecoslovacca, cat. Galleria delle Scorpione, Trieste 1947
- Intelektuál za socialismu / Intellectuals under Socialism, Prague 1949
- Politická závěť Františka Halase / The Political Testament of František Halas, Frankfurt am Main 1952
- Umění dnes / Art Today, Publishing House of Czechoslovak Visual Artists, Prague 1966
- Tschechoslowakische Kunst der Gegenwart, Akademie der Künste Berlin, 1966
- Arte contemporanea in Cecoslovacchia, De Luca Editori ďArte, Rome 1969 (with Palma Bucarelli)
- Il surrealismo eretico di Ladislav Novák, 64 p., Galleria Schwarz, Milan 1974
- Marcel Duchamp a osud moderního umění / Marcel Duchamp and the Fate of Modern Art, 1975, samizdat
- Vladimir Yakovlev, (Gennadiy Aygi, Jindřich Chalupecký), Borgen 1976
- O dada, surrealismu a českém umění / On Dada, Surrealism, and Czech Art, 67 pp. Jazzpetit No. 2; supplement to the Jazz bulletin, Jazz Section, Prague 1977 samizdat
- Cesta Jiřího Koláře / The Journey of Jiří Kolář, 1977, samizdat
- Tschechoslowakei, Die Kunst des 20. Jahrhunderts. Propyläen Kunstgeschichte, Berlin 1979
- Richard Weiner a český expresionismus. Richard Weiner a skupina Le Grand Jeu / Richard Weiner and Czech Expressionism. Richard Weiner and the Le Grand Jeu Groupe, 1979, samizdat
- Podobizna umělce v moderním věku: Duchampsovské meditace / Portrait of an Artist in the Modern Age: Duchampian Meditations, manuscript 1982 (2 volumes)
- Praha 1984 / Prague 1984, Critical Anthology, 1984, samizdat
- Poezie a politika / Poetry and Politics, 1984, samizdat
- Jiří Kolář, Revue K, Alfortville 1987
- Na hranicích umění / On the Frontiers of Art, Arkýř, Munich 1987, ISBN 9783922810162, Prostor Prague 1990, ISBN 8085190060
- Obhajoba umění / Defense of Art 1934-1948 (samizdat 1988), Československý spisovatel Prague 1991, ISBN 9788020203229
- František Janoušek, Odeon Prague 1991, ISBN 8020703284
- Expresionisté / Expressionists: Richard Weiner – Jakub Deml – Ladislav Klíma – Strange Hašek , Torst Prague 1992, ISBN 9788085639001
- Nové umění v Čechách / New Art in Bohemia (samizdat 1988), published by H+H Jinočany 1994, ISBN 8085787814
- Tíha doby / The Weight of Time, (Essays on the temporal context and cultural situations of 1968–1988), Votobia Publishing House, Olomouc 1997, ISBN 8071981753 (paperback)
- Úděl umělce, (Duchampovské meditace) / The Fate of the Artist, (Duchampian Meditations), Torst, Prague 1998, ISBN 8072150502, A művész sorsa: Duchamp-meditációk, Budapest: Balassi, 2002, ISBN 9635064934
- Cestou necestou 1934–1989 / On the Road, Off the Road 1934–1989, Trochtová Z, Rous J, (eds.) published by H+H Jinočany 1994, ISBN 8086022617
- Evropa a umění / Europe and Art (completed 1989), Torst Prague 2005, ISBN 8072152645

=== Selected articles in magazines ===
- Svět, v němž žijeme / The World We Live In, Program D 40, 1939/40, no. 4., 8. 2. 1940, pp. 88–89, reprinted in: Obhajoba umění / Defense of Art, 1991, pp. 68–74; repr. in: České umění / Czech Art 1938–1989, 2001, pp. 35–37.
- Dvě kapitoly k filozofii architektury / Two Chapters on the Philosophy of Architecture, Život 18, 1942, pp. 60–64
- Konec moderní doby / The End of the Modern Era, Listy pro umění a filozofii 1, no. 1 (1946), pp. 7–23; reprinted in: Obhajoba umění / Defense of Art, pp. 155–177; reprinted in: Z dějin českého myšlení o literatuře 1 / From the History of Czech Thought on Literature 1 (1945–1948), Prague 2001, pp. 364–383; repr. in: České umění 1938–1989, 2001, pp. 71–81
- Kultura za okupace / Culture under Occupation, Listy pro umění a filozofii / Letters for Art and Philosophy 1, no. 1 (1946), pp. 132–134; reprinted in: Z dějin českého myšlení o literatuře 1 / From the History of Czech Thought on Literature 1 (1945–1948), Prague 2001, pp. 15–19
- Básník, charakter, politika / Poet, Character, Politics, Listy pro umění a filozofii / Letters for Art and Philosophy 1, no. 2 (1946), pp. 298–302; reprinted in: Z dějin českého myšlení o literatuře 1 / From the History of Czech Thought on Literature 1 (1945–1948), Prague, 2001, pp. 19–25
- Poznámka o Cézannovi / Note on Cézanne, Listy pro umění a filozofii / Letters for Art and Philosophy 1, no. 3 (1947), pp. 460–463
- Kultura a politika / Culture and Politics, Listy pro umění a filozofii / Letters for Art and Philosophy 1, no. 3 (1947), pp. 468–473; reprinted in: Obhajoba umění / Defense of Art, 1991, pp. 178–186; reprinted in: Z dějin českého myšlení o literatuře / From the History of Czech Thought on Literature 1 (1945–1948), Prague, 2001, pp. 217–224; reprinted in: České umění / Czech Art 1938–1989, 2001, pp. 82–86
- Současná filosofie a její čeští kritikové / Contemporary Philosophy and Its Czech Critics, Listy pro umění a filozofii / Letters for Art and Philosophy 2, no. 2 (1948), pp. 69–87
- Nové úkoly / New Tasks, Listy pro umění a filozofii / Letters for Art and Philosophy 3, no. 1 (1948), pp. 16–20; reprinted in: Defense of Art / Obhajoba umění, 1991, pp. 187–197; reprinted in: Z dějin českého myšlení o literatuře / From the History of Czech Thought on Literature 1 (1945–1948), Prague, 2001, pp. 347–356
- Za svět lidštější / For a More Humane World, Výtvarná práce 6, 1958, no. 13/14, pp. 60–64
- Počátky Skupiny 42 / The Beginnings of Group 42, Výtvarná práce 11, 1963, no. 19/20, pp. 1, 8–9
- Byt a filozofie / Apartment and Philosophy, Výtvarná práce 12, 1964, no. 22, pp. 1, 7, no. 23, p. 6
- Co je to abstrakce / What is Abstraction, Výtvarná práce 14, 1964, no. 1, pp. 1, 6.
- Umění / Art 1967, Výtvarná práce 17, 1967, no. 10, pps. 474–483
- Přítomnost člověka / The Presence of Man, Výtvarné umění 18, 1968, no. 1/2, pp. 2–12
- Nezbytí svobody / The Necessity of Freedom, Literární listy I, 28. 11. 1968, no. 4, pp. 1, 3
- Všechnu moc dělnickým radám / All Power to the Workers' Councils, Listy I, 20. 2. 1969, no. 7, pp. 1, 3
- Happening a spol. / Happening and Co, Sešity 1969, no. 33, pp. 13–16
- Tragické umění / Tragic Art, Výtvarná práce 18, 1970, no. 10, p. 7
- Umění v našem věku / Art in Our Time, Výtvarné umění 20, 1970, no. 2, pp. 65–74
- The Fate of a Generation, Notiazario di Arte Contemporanea 1972, no. 10, pp. 10–14
- Moscow Diary, Studio International (London) 185, 1973, no. 952, pp. 81–96
- Les symboles chez M. Duchamp, Opus International 1974
- Tempo Zero, Data (Milano) 1975, 18. Sept–Oct., pp. 80–87
- Art in a different world, Studio International 167, 1976, no. 982 (July-Aug.), pp. 79–82
- L'anima dell'androgino" / "The Soul of the Androgyne, Flash Art 1977, č. 78/79 Nov.–Dec., s. 55–57
- The Work and the Sacrifice, Flash Art 1978, no. 80/81 Feb.–April, p. 31
- L´Europe e l´arte, Flash Art 1981
- Spellbound by Prague, Cross-Currents 1982
- The Leson of Prague, Studio International 196, 1983
- No Longer Art, Art Monthly 79, 1984, Sept., pp. 3–5
- Marcel Duchamp - A Re-Evaluation, Artibus et Historiae 6, no. 11, 1985, p. 125-136
- Les ready-made de Duchamp et la Théorie du symbole, Artibus et Historiae 7, no. 13, 1986, p. 153-163

=== Translations ===
- Articles by Heidegger, Jaspers and Sartre for the periodical Listy pro umění a filozofii, Søren Kierkegaard for the periodical Život
- T. S. Eliot, The Waste Land / Pustá země, translation J. Hauková and J. Chalupecký, ed. Stýblo, Prague 1946

== Sources ==
- Onřej Houšťava (ed.), Světy Jindřicha Chalupeckého / Worlds of J.Ch., Společnost Jindřicha Chalupeckého, Praha 2022, ISBN 978-80-908535-0-8
- Marie Gabrielová, Tvrdohlaví podruhé a potřetí / Stubborn for the second and third time, Diploma thesis, FF UP Olomouc, 2018
- Anděla Horová: Jindřich Chalupecký, in: Lubomír Slavíček (ed.), Slovník historiků umění, výtvarných kritiků, teoretiků a publicistů v českých zemích a jejich spolupracovníků z příbuzných oborů (asi 1800-2008) / Dictionary of Art Historians, Art Critics, Theorists, and Publicists in the Czech Lands and Their Collaborators from Related Fields (ca. 1800–2008), 1st edition, 2 volumes (1807 pp.), Vol. 1. A-M, Academia, Prague 2016, ISBN 978-80-200-2094-9, pp. 510–513
- Aneta Skotníková, Contemporary Czech art groups, Bachelor´s thesis, PedF UK Prague, 2014
- Pavel Kosatík, Česká inteligence (Od Jaroslava Golla po Magora) / Czech inteligentsia, Mladá fronta, Prague 2011, pp. 280–285
- Jakub Hladík, Listy, quarterly magazine for art and philosophy 1946–1948 (history and development of the magazine, bibliography). Bachelor's thesis, Institute of Czech Literature and Literary Studies, Faculty of Arts, Charles University, 2011
- Josef Ledvina, "Czech Art Around 1980 from the Point of View of Cultural Sociology", Master thesis, Institute of Art History, Faculty of Arts of the Charles University, 2010
- Kateřina Sedláková, Jindřich Chalupecký on art. Reflections from the 1940s and 1960s. Bachelor's thesis, Faculty of Arts, Masaryk University, Brno, 2009
- Jana Zaoralová, On the poetics of Group 42. Diploma thesis, Faculty of Pedagogy, Charles University, Prague, 2006
- Zina Trochtová, Jan Rous (eds.): Jindřich Chalupecký - Cestou necestou / By hook or by crook, H & H, Jinočany 1999, ISBN 80-86022-61-7
- J. Sedlář: Jindřich Chalupecký, in: Jiří Gabriel (ed.), Slovník českých filozofů / Dictionary of Czech philosophers, Masaryk University Brno 1998, ISBN 9788021018402, pp. 215–216
- Vladimír Forst, et al., Lexikon české literatury : osobnosti, díla, instituce (Encyclopedia of Czech Literature: Personalities, Works, Institutions). Compiled by a team of authors and editors, editor-in-chief Jiří Opelík, 7 volumes (589 pp.), 1st edition. Volume 2/I. H-J., Academia, Prague 1993, ISBN 80-200-0468-8
- Jiří Brabec et al., Dictionary of Banned Authors: 1948-1980. 1st edition. Prague: State Pedagogical Publishing House, 1991. 541 pp. Monolingual specialized dictionaries, ISBN 80-04-25417-9
- Martin Podivínský, in: Machala L (ed.), Česká a slovenská literatura v exilu a samizdatu / Czech and Slovak literature in exile and samizdat, Hanácké nakladatelství Olomouc 1991, pp. 126–127
- Bregantová P, Dostálová K,. Bibliography of the works of Jindřich Chalupecký. Výtvarná kultura 1990, no. 3, pp. 9–15
- Jaromír Pelc: Group 42, Kmen, no. 42, Prague 1989, October 19, pp. 1–5
- Kdo je kdo / Who is who 1969, p. 296
- Jaroslav Kunc, Česká literární bibliografie I - dodatky / Czech literary bibliography I, Supplements, Prague 1964, p. 772
