= Jiří Kolář =

Czech poet, playwright, and artist (1914–2002)

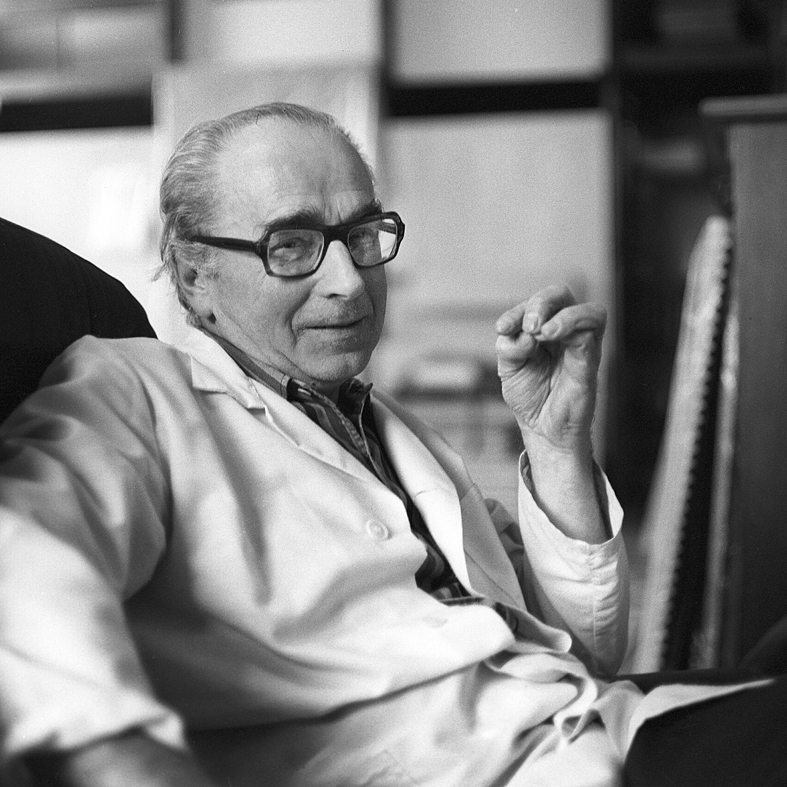
Kolář in 1979

Jiří Kolář (Czech pronunciation; 24 September 1914 – 11 August 2002) was a Czech poet, writer, painter and translator. His work included both literary and visual art.

== Life ==
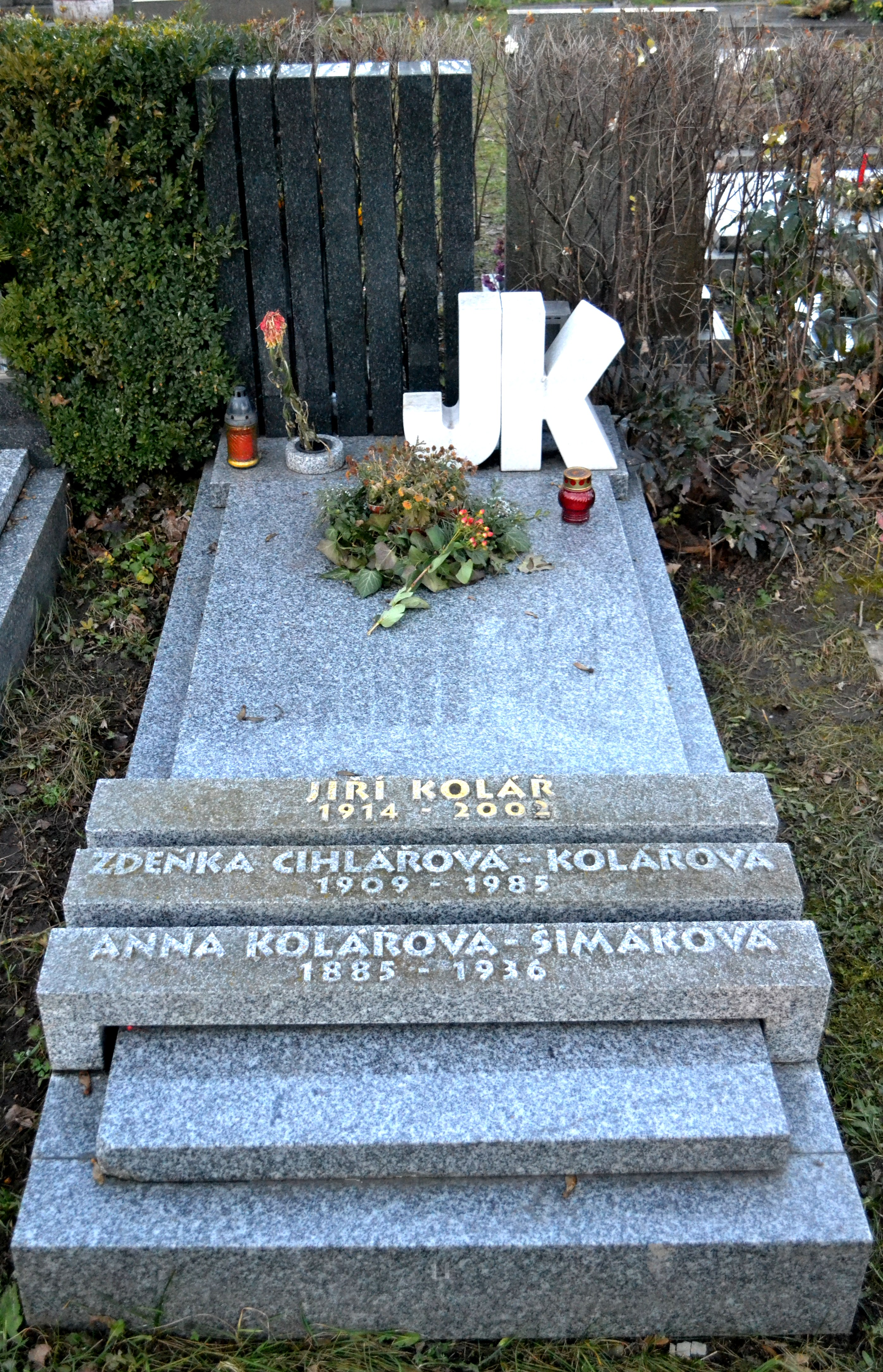
Grave of Koláš at Vinohrady Cemetery

Kolář was born on 24 September 1914 in Protivín, Bohemia, Austria-Hungary, in a working-class environment. His father was a baker and his mother a seamstress, and he himself trained early in life as a cabinet maker (which cost him a finger). He later changed trades several times, working as a construction worker, security guard, and bartender, among other jobs. In 1943 he became a full-time writer while living and working in Kladno. He moved to Prague in 1945 to work as an editor of the publishing house Družstvo Dílo. Kolář joined the Communist Party in 1945 but left the Party the same year. Because of his critical stance towards the regime he was not allowed to publish after communists took control in Czechoslovakia in 1948. He married Běla Helclová in 1949. When in 1952 police found his manuscript, Prométheova játra, in the property of Václav Černý he was arrested and spent several months in prison.

Kolář was one of a group of several artists, among whom Václav Havel, Václav Černý, Jan Vladislav and Josef Hiršal, who met and discussed in Café Slavia, both during the period leading up to the Prague Spring when the communist regime grew more permissive, and in the period of normalization after the Prague Spring. Kolář's wild behavior lost him former friends (e.g. he threw coffee on Josef Hiršal's shirt and had his soda water poured on him in return). The failure of the Prague Spring in 1968 brought Kolář and his work into disrepute again. In 1970 cerebral apoplexy stiffened his right arm. Kolář signed Charter 77 and while on a scholarship to West Berlin, the government decided to force him to emigrate; he was therefore not allowed to return home. From 1980 on he lived in Paris. After 1989 he visited his homeland more and more often. In 1999 Kolář injured his spine and he spent his last years in a Prague hospital.

== Literary work ==
Kolář's poetry was first published in 1938 in a private edition; these early poems are not included in his complete work, probably because they are openly erotic, describing oral sex (Ústnice), sex positions (Svícen a trakař) and sex with a prostitute (Růže Večernice). Thus Křestný list (Baptism Certificate, 1941) is considered his debut. Křestný list and Kolář's three other collections of poems from the 1940s (Sedm kantát, Limb a jiné básně, Ódy a variace) belong stylistically to the existentialist artistic movement of Skupina 42 of which Kolář was a member; other members included Jindřich Chalupecký, Ivan Blatný, Josef Kainar, Jiřina Hauková and Kamil Lhoták.

During the years of Stalinism in Czechoslovakia (1948–1953) Kolář wrote poetic diaries – Očitý svědek (Eyewitness, 1949), Prométheova játra (Prometheus' Liver, 1950). In 1957 he wrote a creative re-interpretation of Sun Zi's The Art of War, an ancient Chinese classic on the art of warfare, under the name Mistr Sun o básnickém umění (Master Sun on the Poetic Arts). In 1964 Náhodný svědek (Accidental Witness), a selection of his work from the 1940s was published, and in 1966 a censored selection from his 1950s work came out under the name Vršovický Ezop (Aesop from Vršovice). In the 1960s he started writing experimental poetry, creating new forms of poetry which he gave names such as analfabetogram and cvokogram. In these new forms of poetry the line between the literary and the visual increasingly started to blur, which ultimately led to his experiments in visual art.

== Death ==
Kolář died in Prague on 11 August 2002, at the age of 87.

=== Poetry ===
- Křestný list (1941)
- Sedm kantát (1945)
- Limb a jiné básně (1945)
- Ódy a variace (1946)
- Dny v roce (1948)
- Mistr Sun o básnickém umění (1957)
- Básně ticha (1965)
- Evidentní poezie (1965)
- L'enseigne de Gersaint (1965, also in English and German, title taken from Watteau's painting)
- Vršovický Ezop (1966)
- Nový Epiktet (1968)
- Návod k upotřebení (1969)
- Očitý svědek (Munich 1983)
- Prométheova játra (Toronto 1985, Prague 1991)
- Roky v dnech (1992)

=== Translations and re-told stories ===
- Ezop: Bajky (1957, adaptation of old Czech texts)
- Kocourkov (1959, based on Johann Friedrich von Schönberg, written with Josef Hiršal)
- O podivuhodném životě mudrce Ezopa, který rozuměl řeči ptáků, zvířat, hmyzu, rostlin i věcí (1960, adaptation of old Czech texts, written with Hiršal)
- Enšpígl (1962, adaptation of old German texts, written with Hiršal)
- Baron Prášil (1965, based on Gottfried August Bürger, written with Hiršal)

=== Plays ===
- Mor v Athénách (1965)
- Unser täglich Brot (Vienna 1966, translated by K. B. Schäufellen, in Czech Chléb náš vezdejší, Prague 1991)

== Visual art ==
His first exhibitions in 1937 focused on his collages. In the 1960s Kolář first combined painting and poetry but he gradually turned completely to experiments in visual art. In his work he used a scalpel to cut pictures out of magazines. He produced colors in his collages by gluing on printed fragments of paper from various different sources.

His collages were intended to influence the viewer's outlook on life; the technique of using fragments of text and images from various different sources was well suited to achieve the effect Kolář wanted, by showing the destruction and fragmentation of the world Kolář inhabited. Simultaneously, by juxtaposition and contrasting of these different fragments the technique of the collage served to create surprising and visually striking new combinations; for instance, the combination of astronomical maps with Braille writing. Kolář invented or helped to develop new techniques of collage – confrontage, froissage, rollage, chiasmage and others.

From the 1960s Kolář's visual artwork was featured regularly in exhibitions by galleries and museums. Some of the more prominent exhibitions of his work were in the New York Guggenheim museum in 1975, in Prague in 1994 in Dům U Černé Matky Boží, in Madrid in 1996 in the Museo Nacional Centro de Arte Reina Sofia.

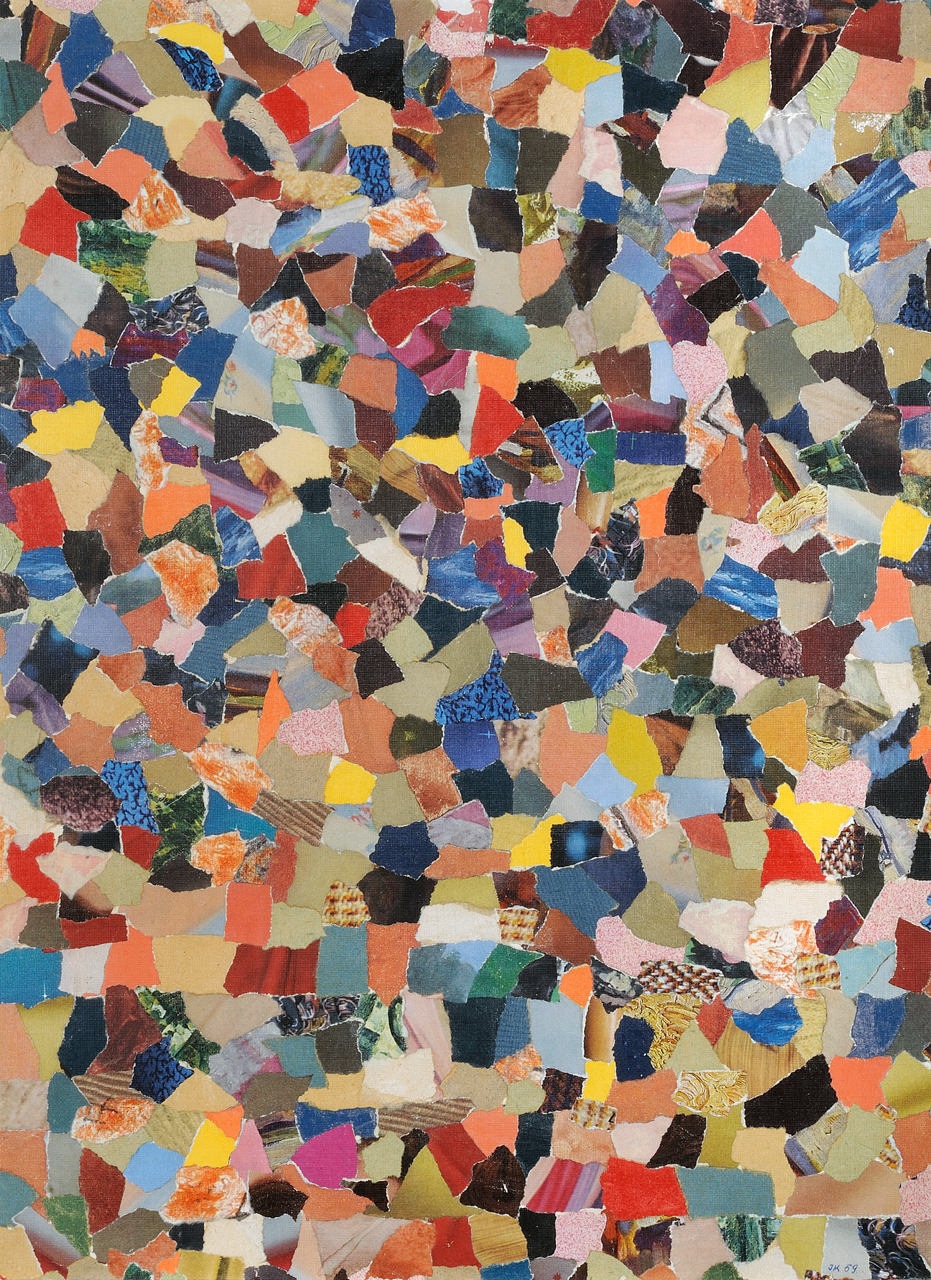
Jiří Kolář, In full sunlight (1959), collage

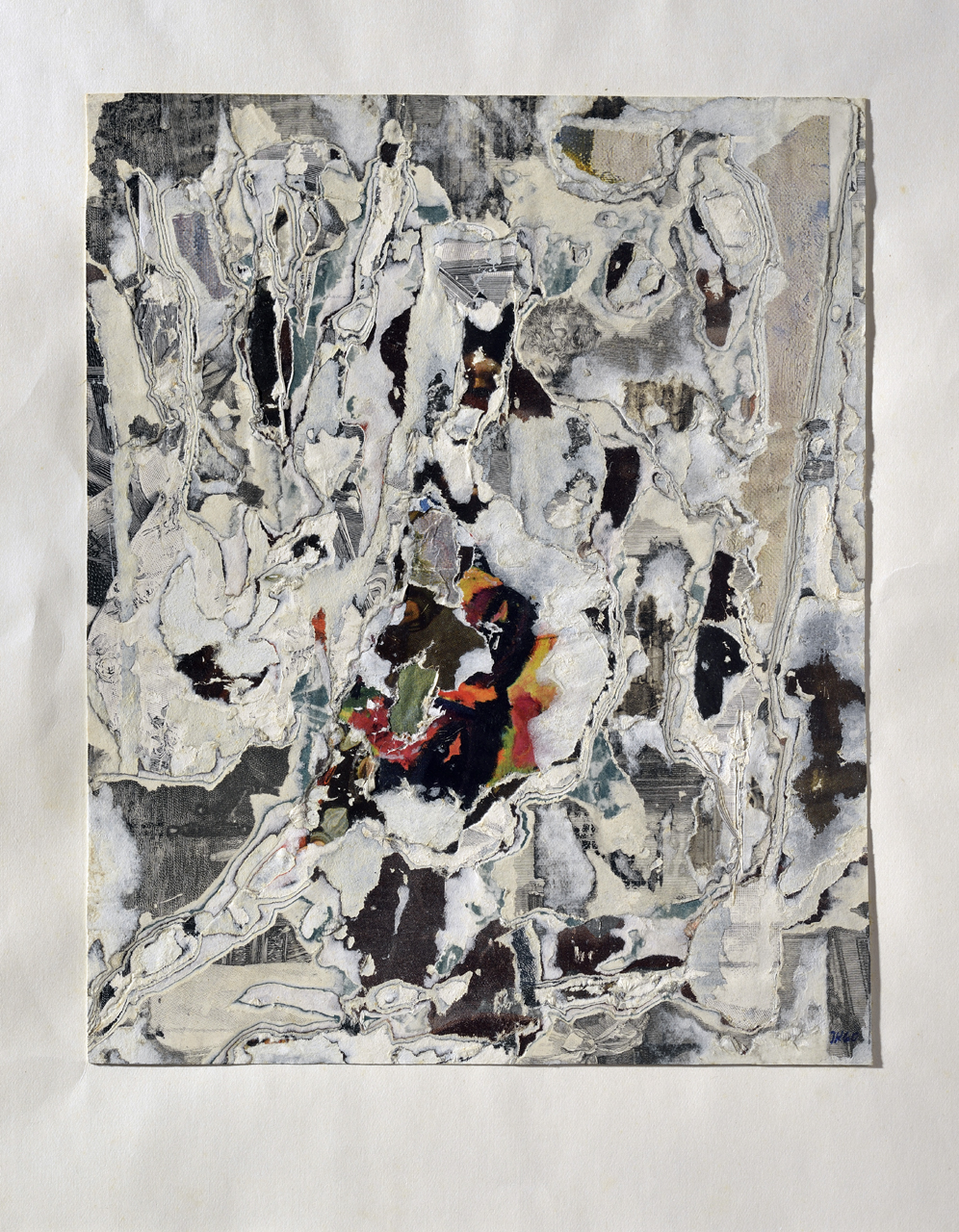
Jiří Kolář, Cast down face (1960), stratifie

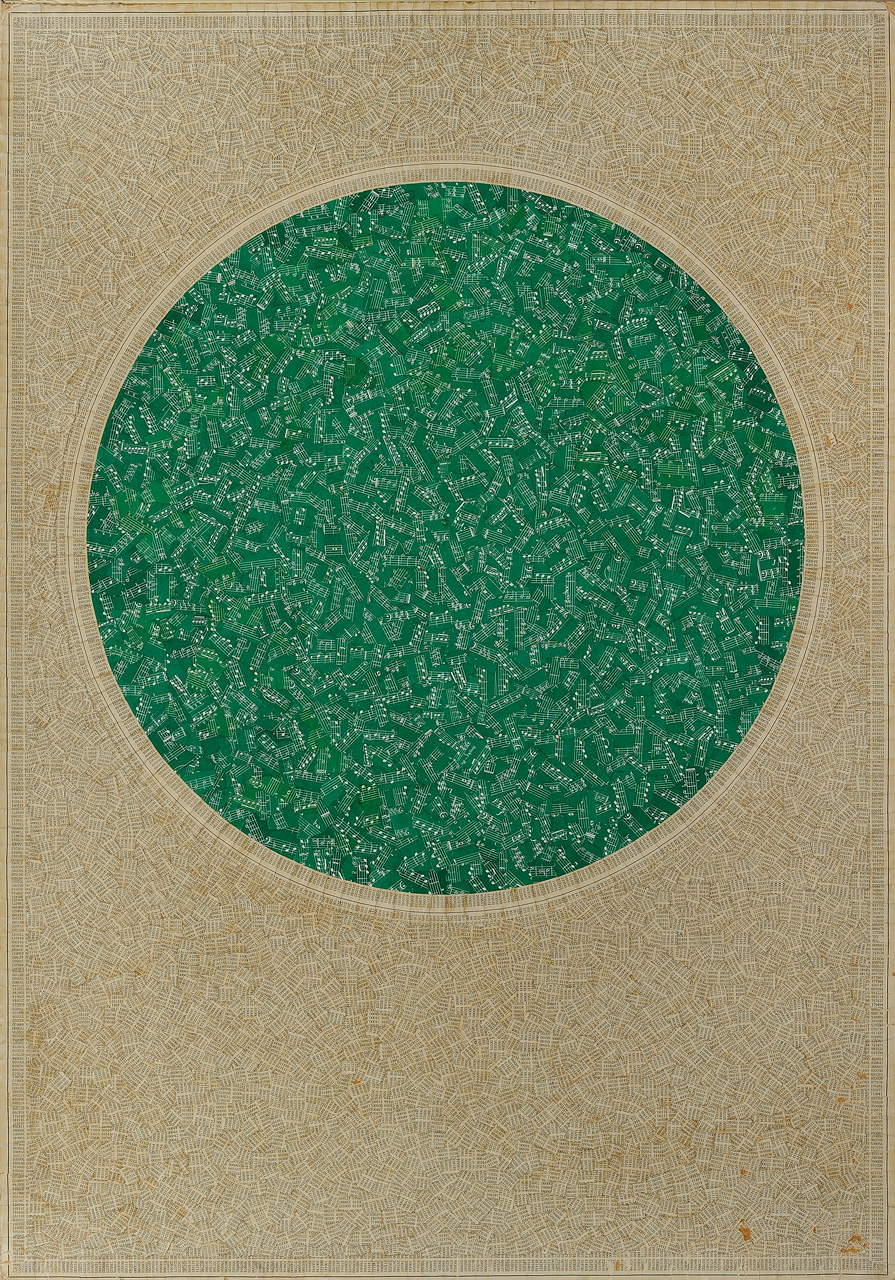
Jiří Kolář, Musical Circle (1965), embossed chiasmage

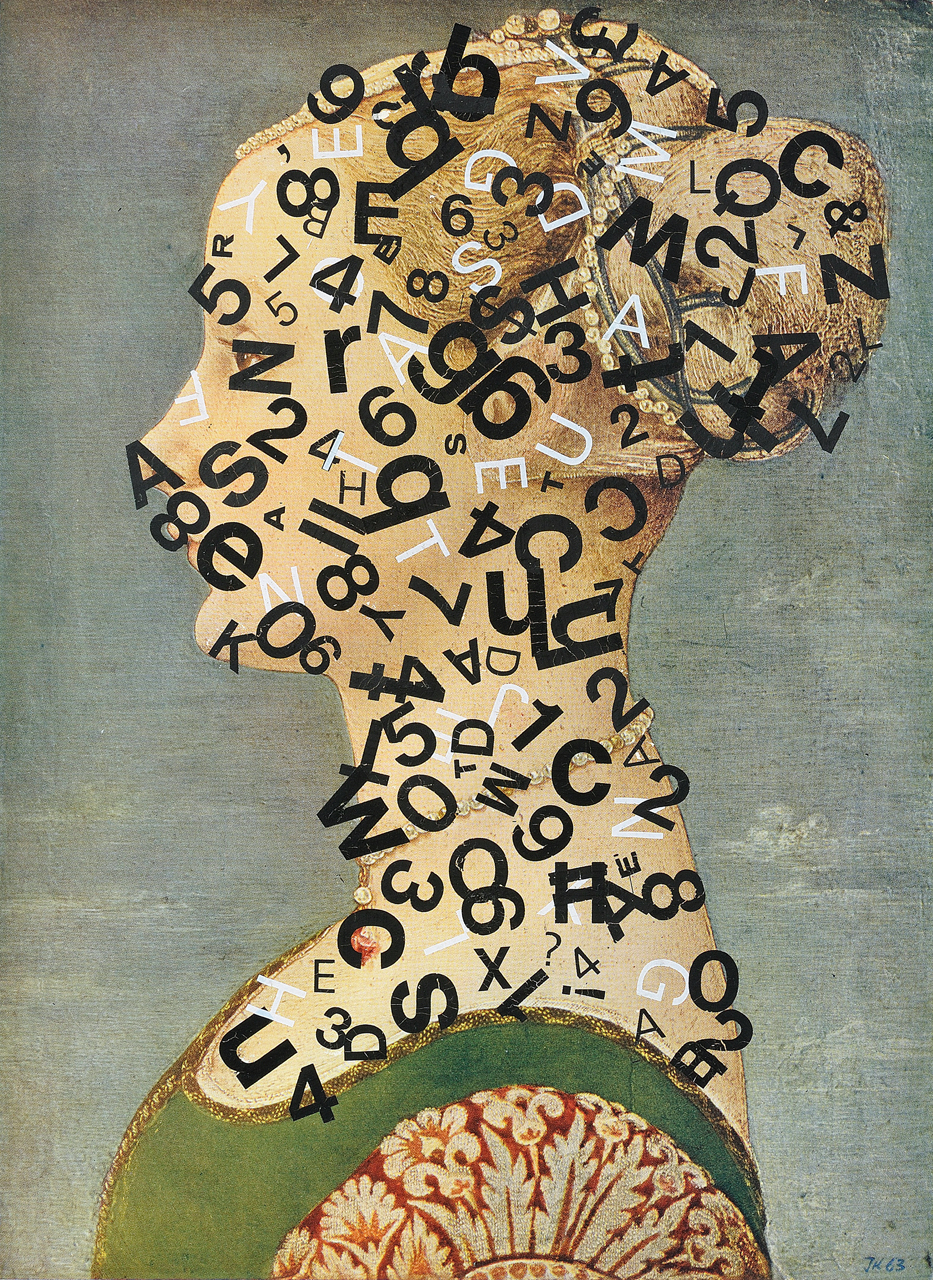
Jiří Kolář, Descriptive portrait (1963), collage

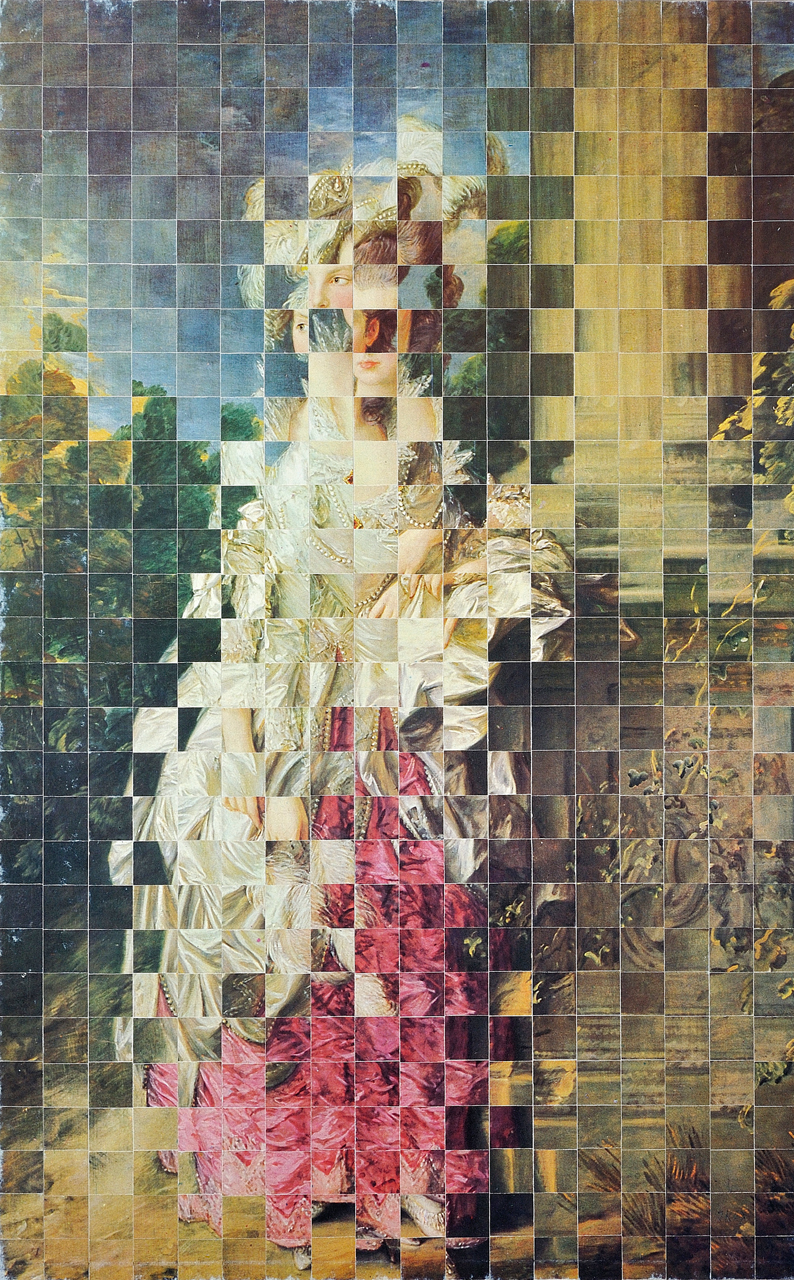
Jiří Kolář, Lady in love (1967), rollage-cubomania

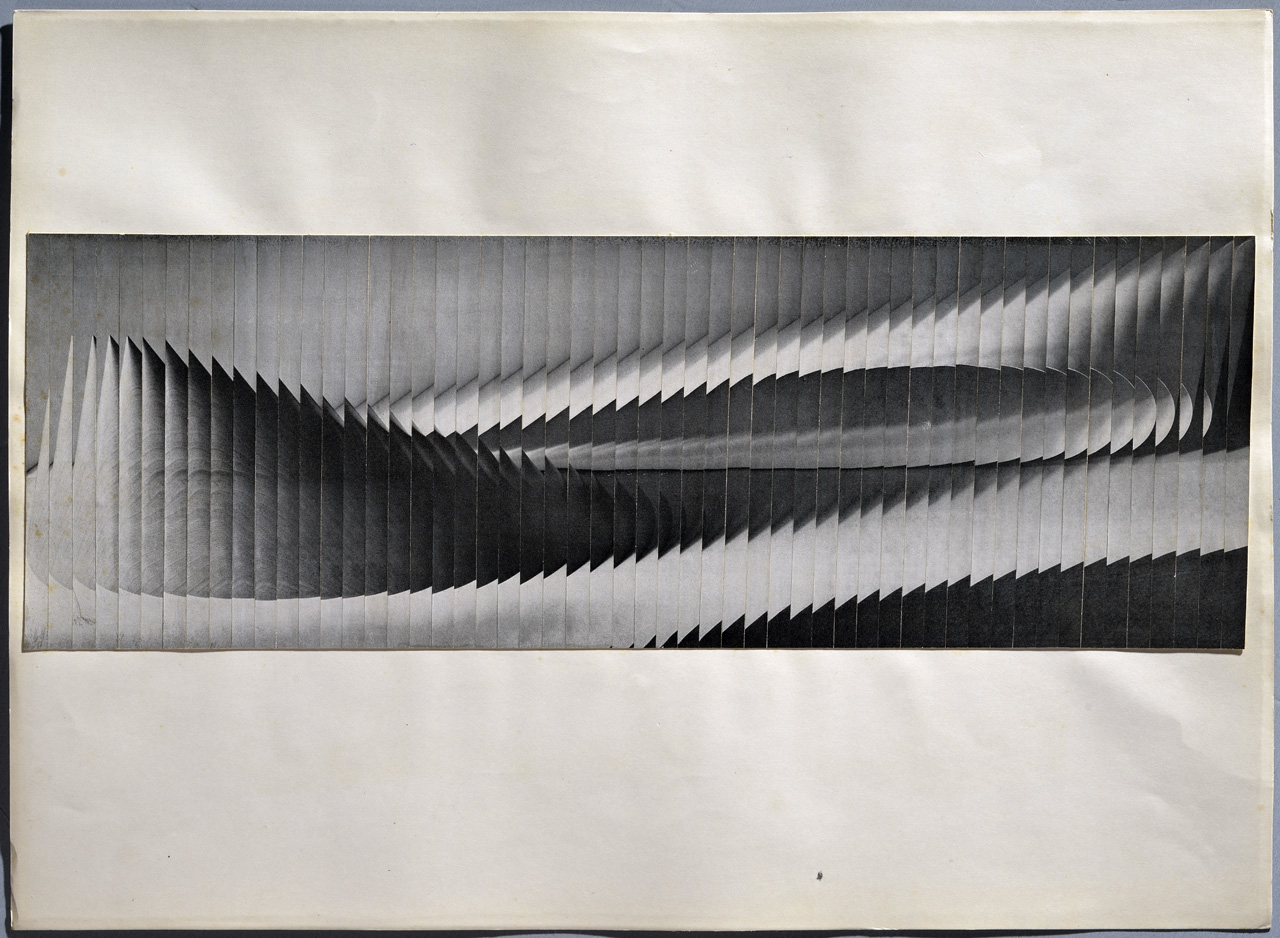
Jiří Kolář, No title (1959–1962), rollage

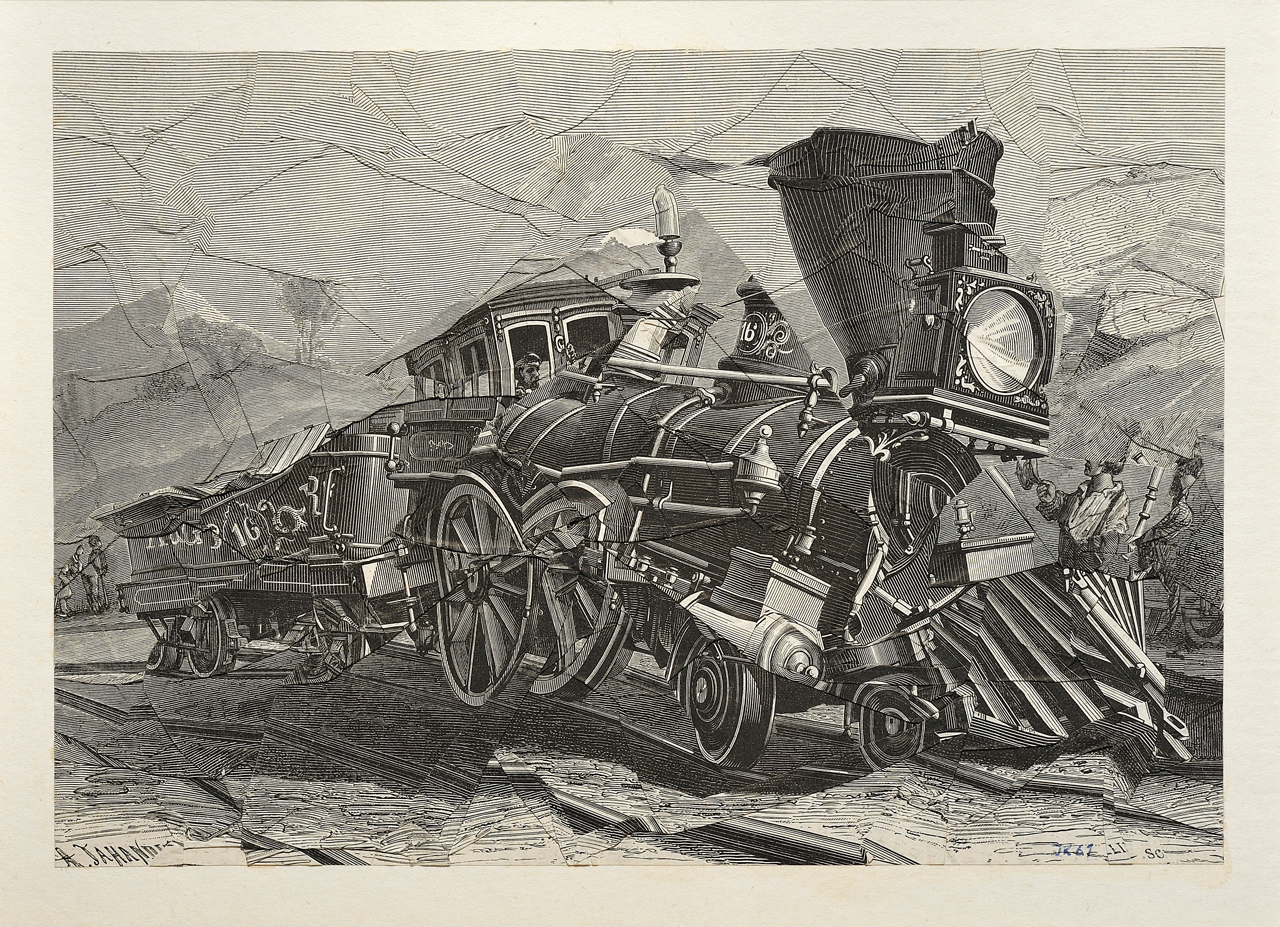
Jiří Kolář, Serve to Muse, at least once (1962), froissage

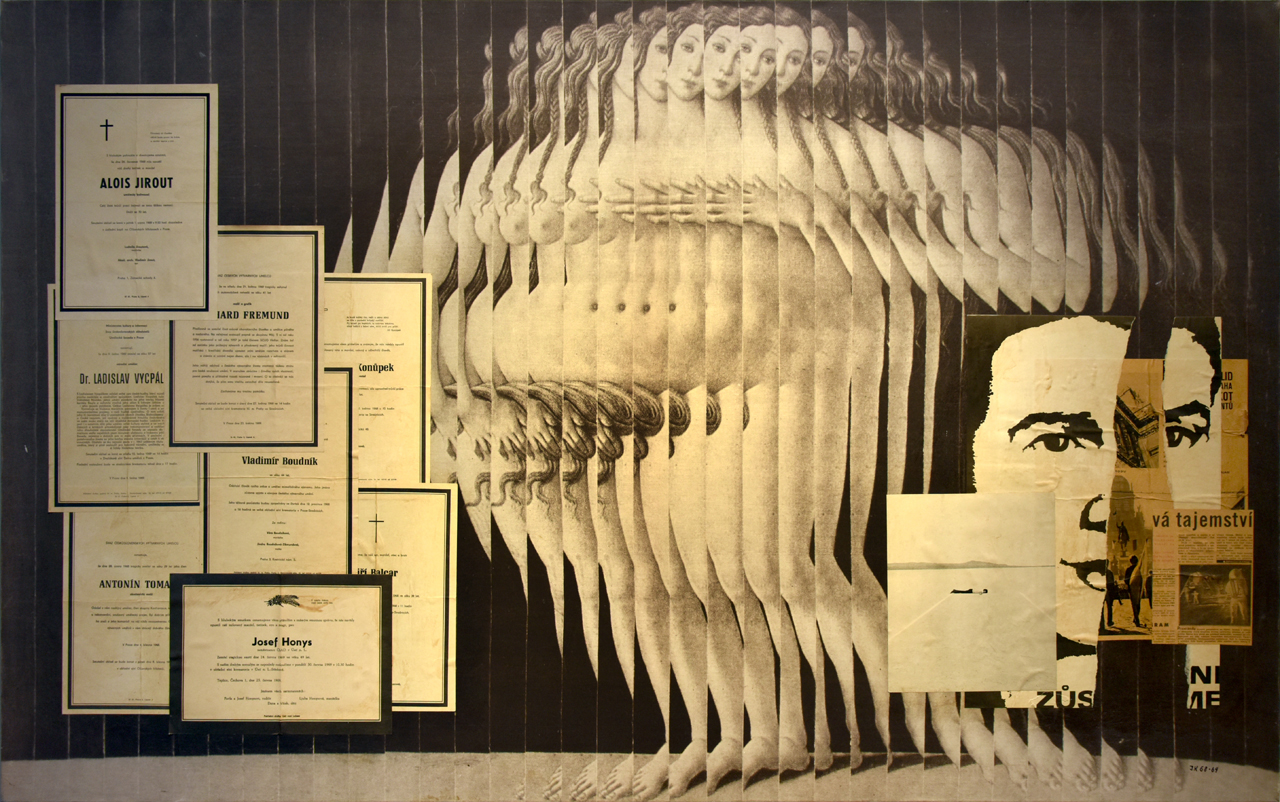
Jiří Kolář, Hommage to Jan Palach (1968–1969), rollage and collage

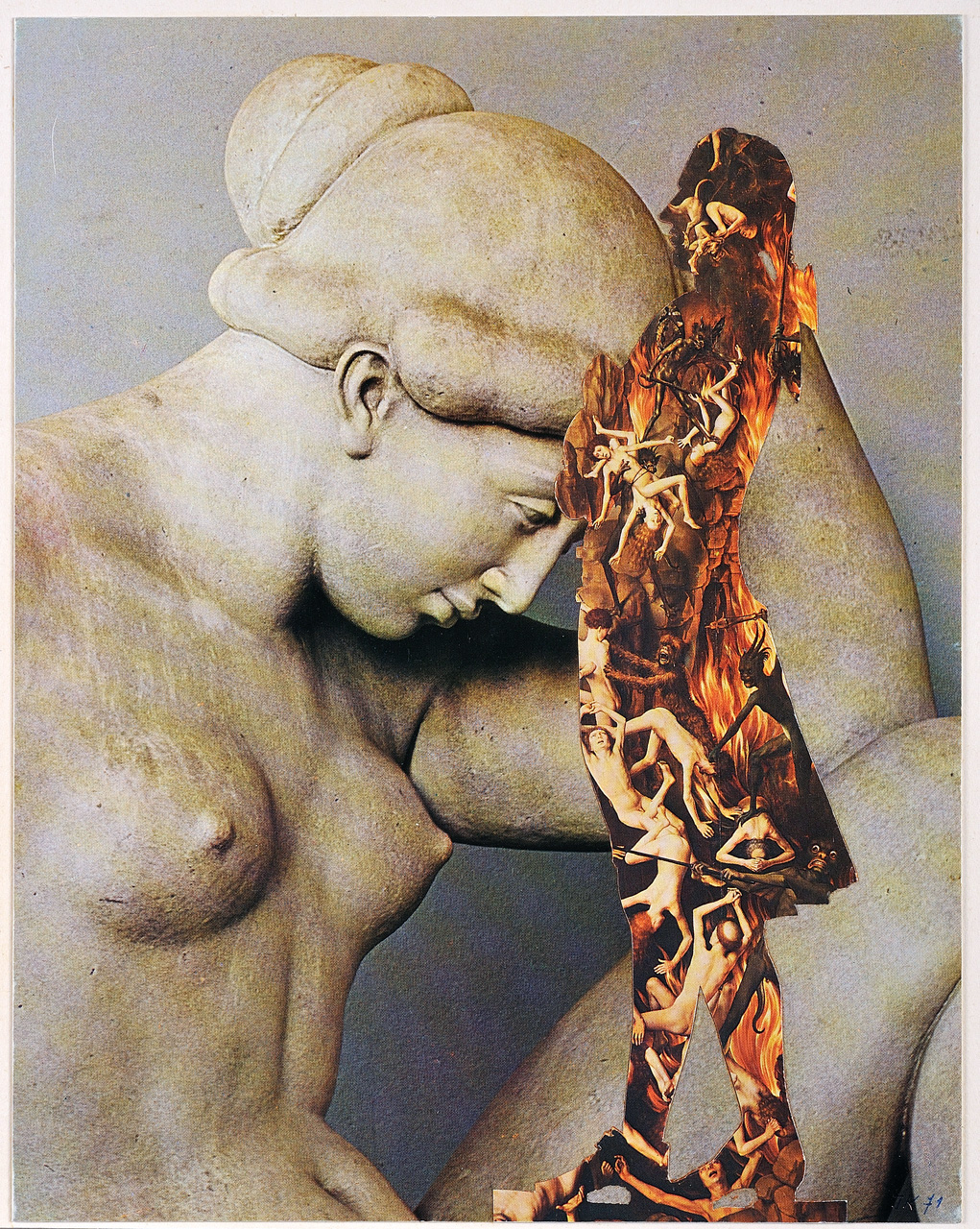
Jiří Kolář, Beautiful hell (1971), prollage

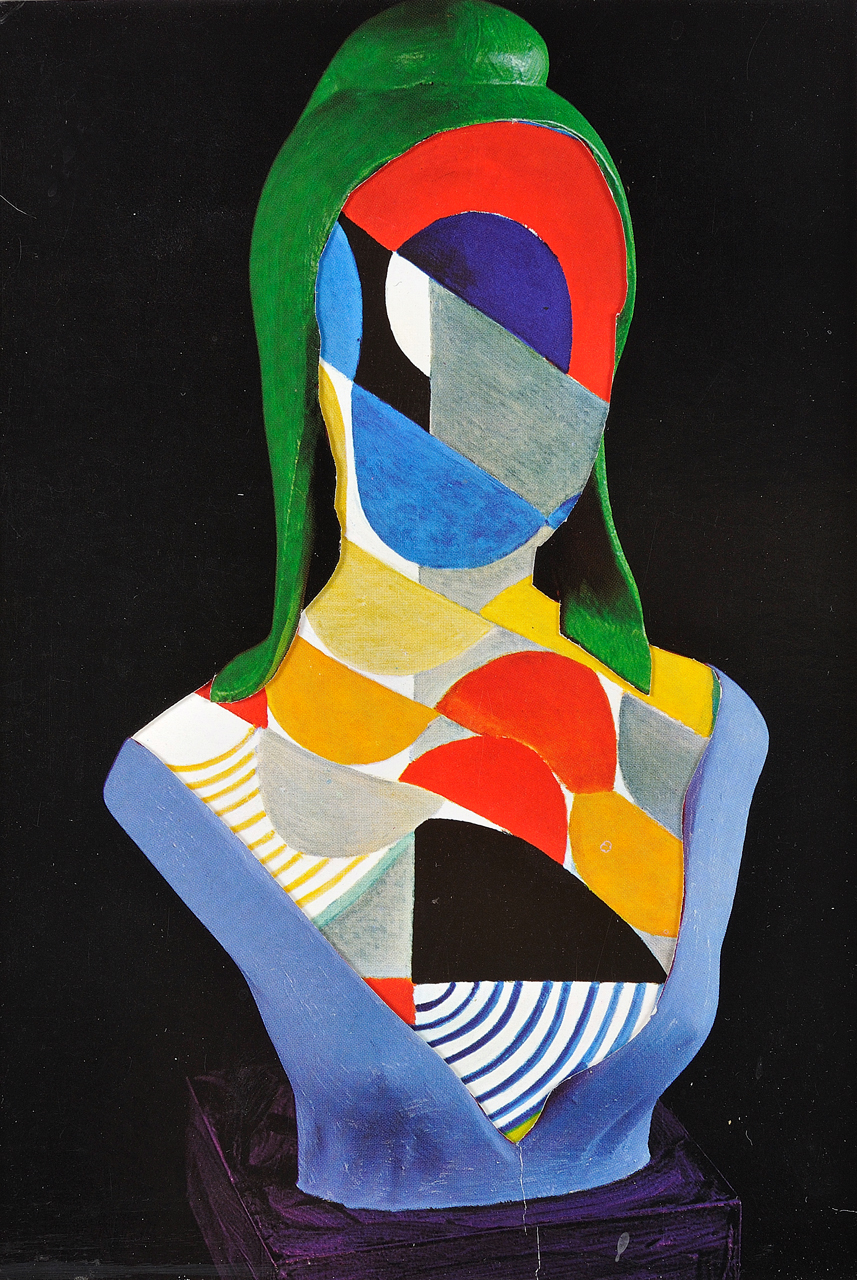
Jiří Kolář, P.F. 89 (1988), intercollage

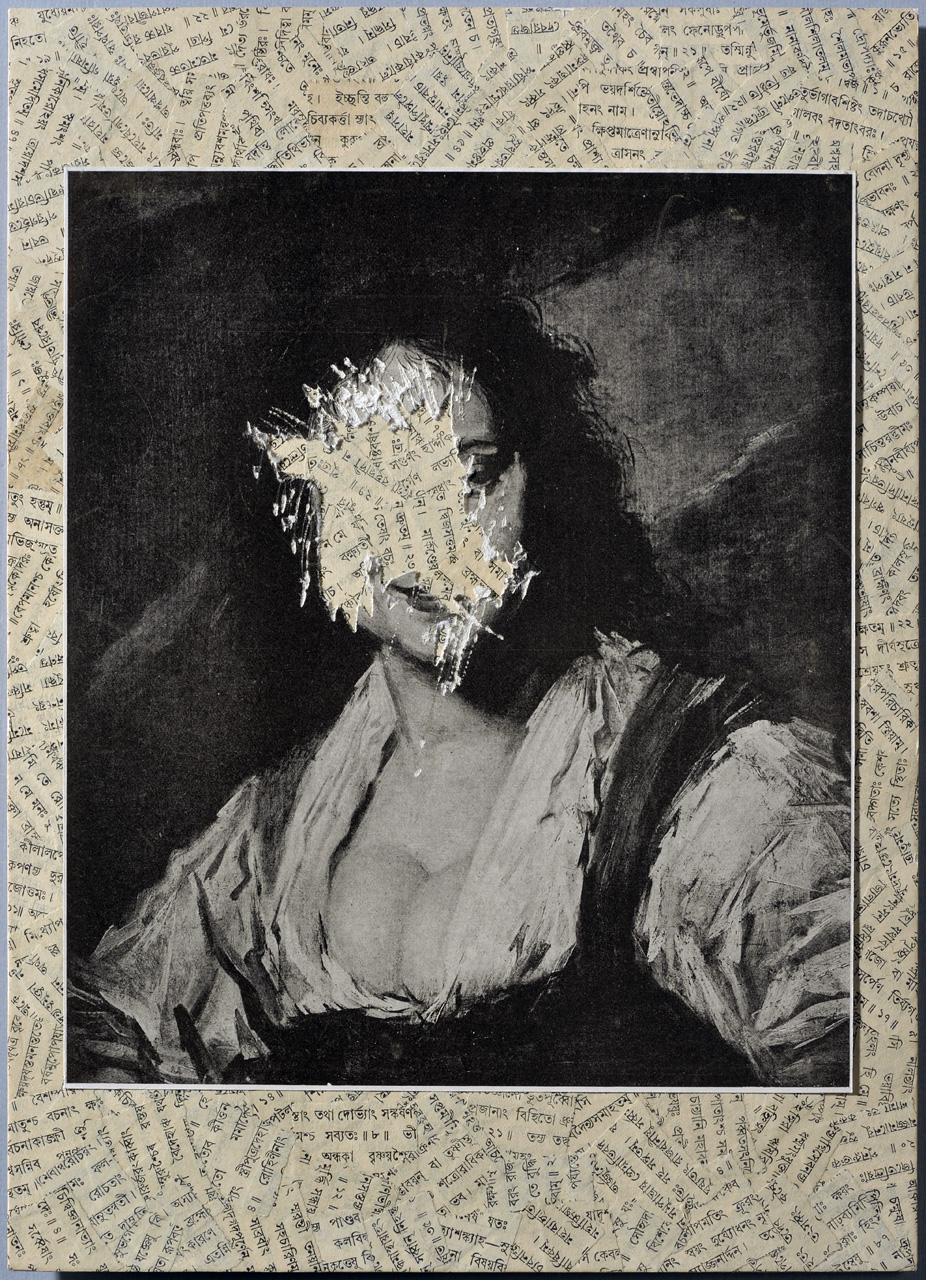
Jiří Kolář, No title (1965), scratched collage and chiasmage

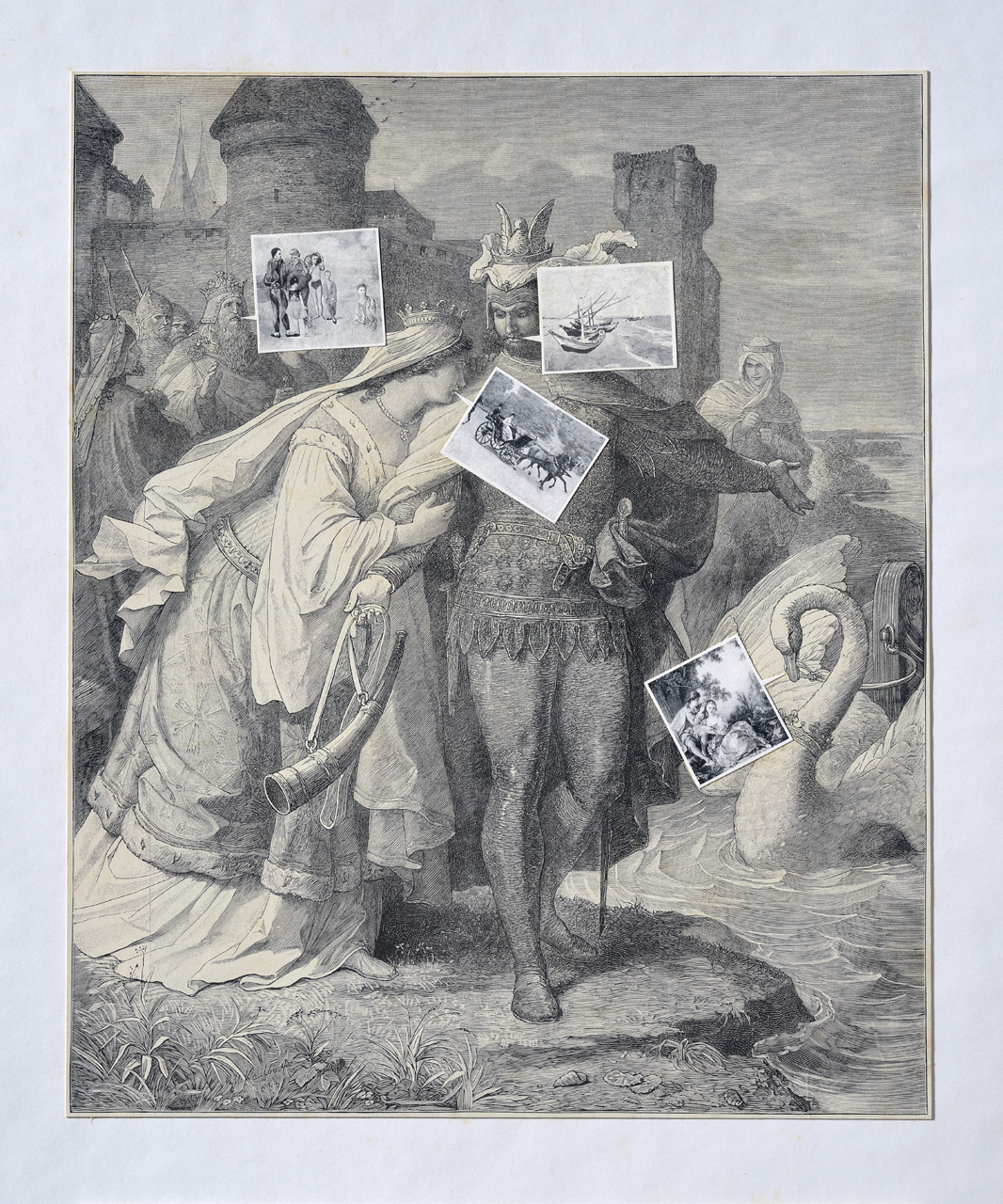
Jiří Kolář, Lohengrin, comics (1964), collage

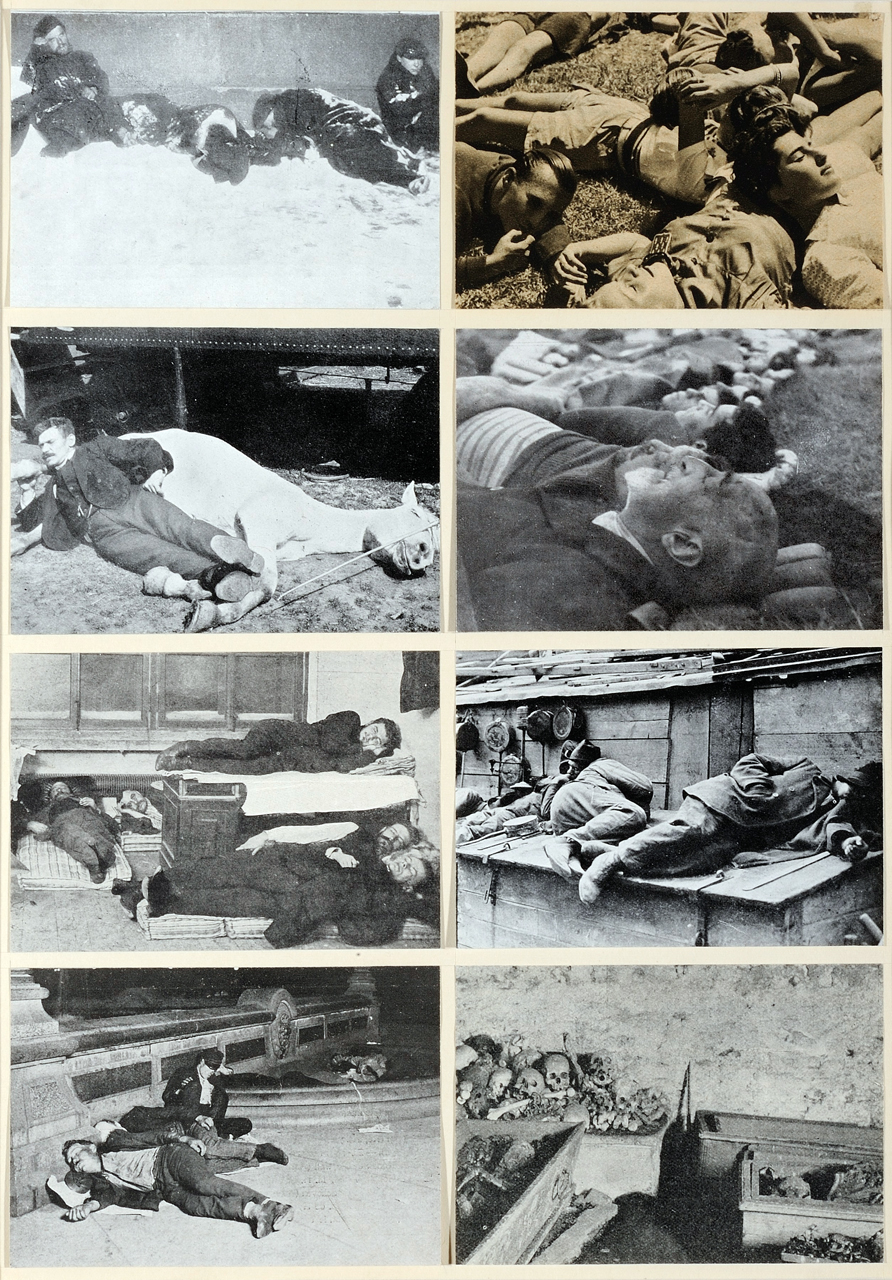
Jiří Kolář, Sleepers (1952), confrontage

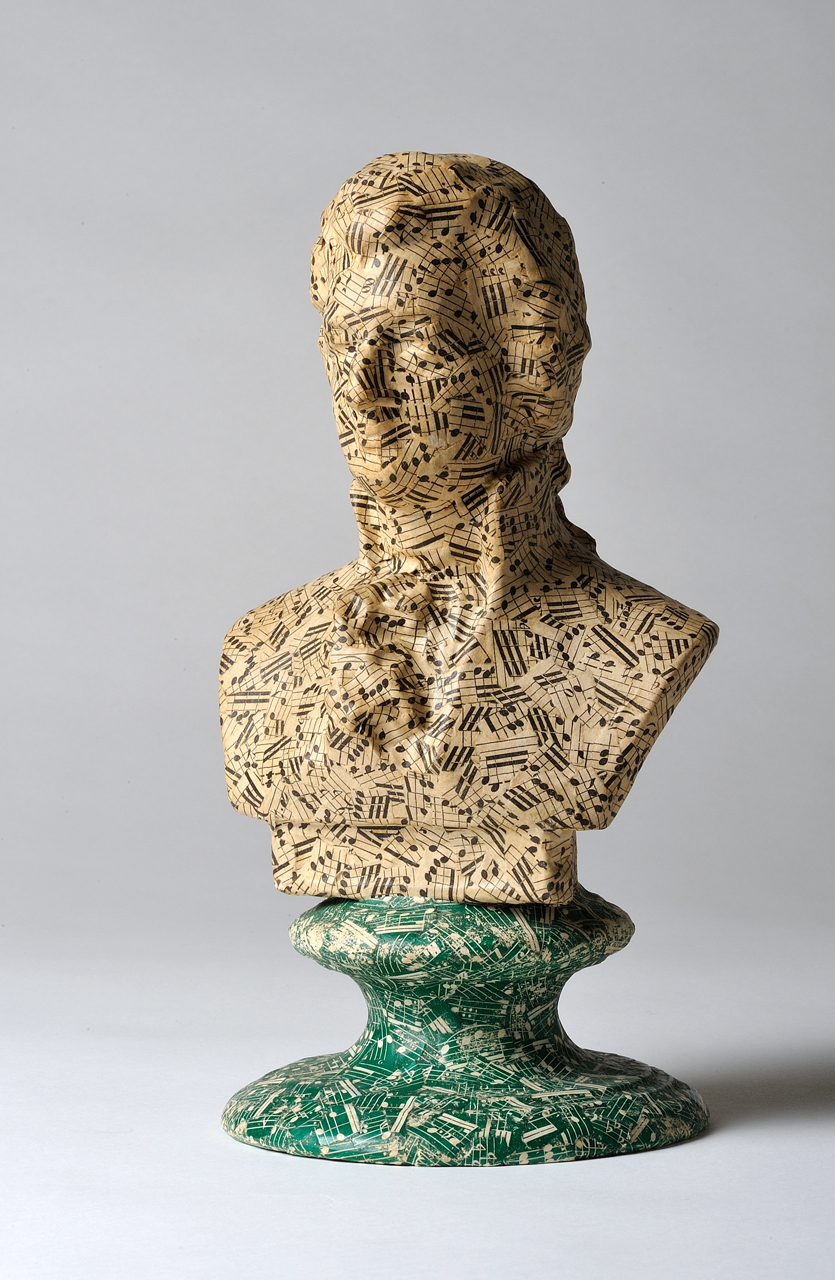
Jiří Kolář, W. A. Mozart (60s), chiasmage, collaged object

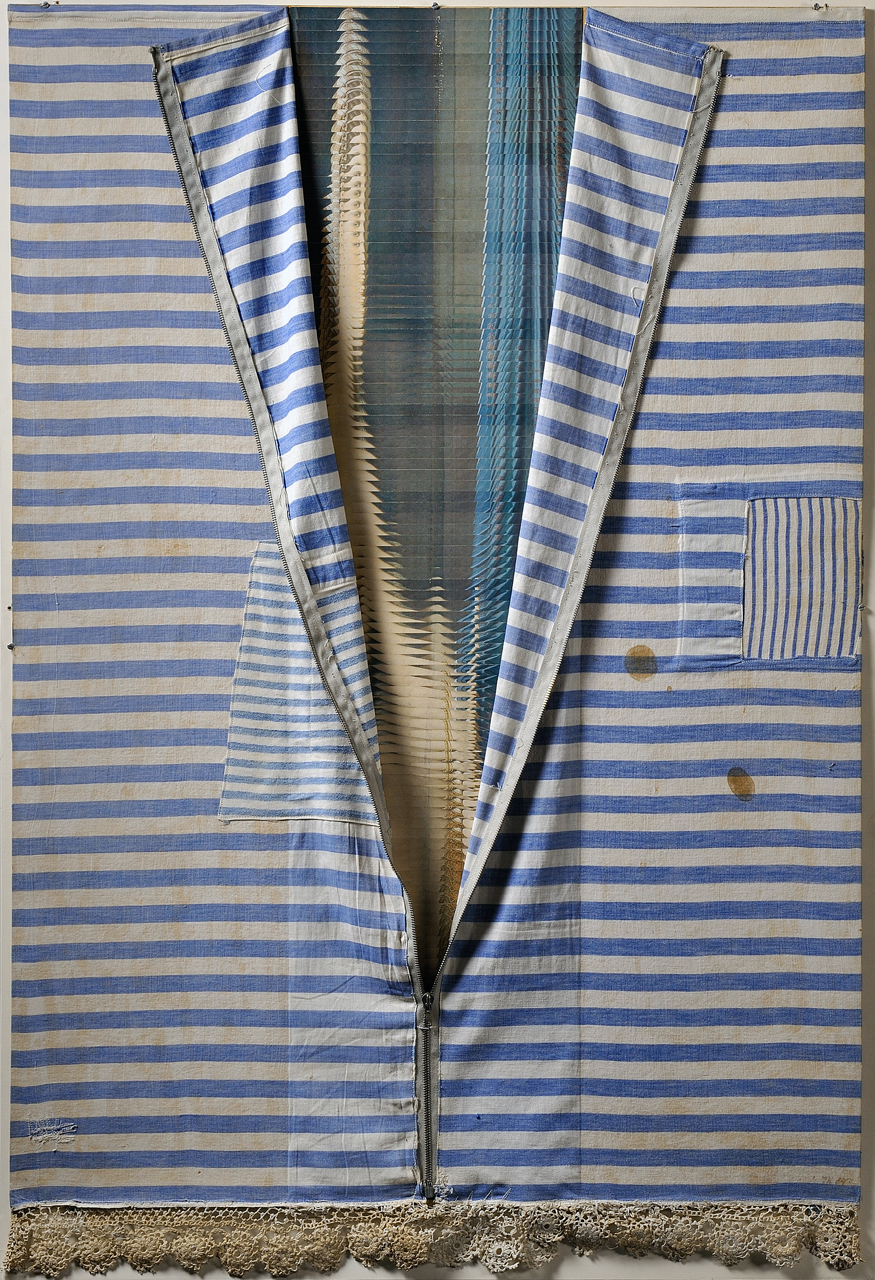
Jiří Kolář, Odalisque (1964), unzipped collage, rollage
