= Matal =

Matal may refer to:

- Matal language, Cameroon
- Bohumír Matal, Czech painter
- Matal v. Tam, a U.S. Supreme Court case
