= Richard Weiner (Czech writer) =

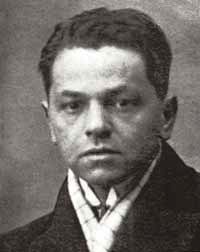
Richard Weiner

Richard Weiner (6 November 1884 – 3 January 1937) was a Czech writer, poet, and journalist. He is considered one of the most notable 20th century Czech authors, and influenced the literary work of many of his peers, as well as younger writers. His works, however, are little known outside of the Czech Republic. Because of his enigmatic writings, he has often been likened to Franz Kafka, although mutual influences can be ruled out with near certainty. He has been called "the poet of anxiety", others spoke of him as "the Odd-man out" of Czech literature. Karel Čapek, his contemporary, dubbed him "the man of pain."

He was a cousin of lawyer and member of the Czechoslovak government-in-exile Rudolf Rabl.

== Life ==
Weiner was born in Písek, South Bohemian Region, Austria-Hungary (now the Czech Republic). His parents ran a distillery and confectionery and Richard, the oldest of five children, was destined to take over the family's business. He studied chemistry at the Technical University in Prague and after graduating in 1906 with a degree in Chemical engineering he went on to take further studies in Zurich and Aachen. In 1908 he served in the military and in 1909 he began working as a chemist in the Bohemian city of Pardubice, and in Freising and Allach (near Munich, Germany).

In 1911, however, and after many sleepless nights, Weiner determined that he would rather try to make his living as an independent journalist and writer. The following year he moved to Paris and started writing as a correspondent for the Czech daily newspaper Samostatnost. Beginning in 1913 he primarily worked for Lidové noviny and published his first volume of poetry. While he was on vacation in Prague in the summer of 1914 World War I broke out. He was conscripted for military service and served at the Serbian front. In January 1915 he suffered a nervous breakdown and was discharged from the army. For the rest of the war he worked for various Prague newspapers and published three collections of short stories, among them Lítice (Furies, 1916), one of the first Czech books dealing with World War I.

In 1919 Weiner returned to Paris once again as a correspondent for Lidové noviny. He was to stay in Paris for nearly the rest of his life, only returning to Prague in 1936 when he had fallen seriously ill with stomach cancer. He died in a Prague sanatorium on 3 January 1937. He was buried at the Jewish cemetery of his hometown. His tomb was wrecked in a pogrom shortly before the outbreak of World War II.

== Work ==
=== Journalist ===
Weiner's journalistic work focused on French and particularly Parisian politics and culture, but covered everyday life and sensational crimes as well. He reviewed plays, literature, and exhibitions and even wrote a regular column on fashion under a female pseudonym. His style has been described as "impressionist" by contemporaries. For this reason his work may be difficult to understand now, because Weiner presupposed familiarity with the news of his day. "But is not his journalistic writing of that time a wonderful source of study of this time-period?" his friend and fellow correspondent Gustav Winter asked in his obituary of 1937. "This time period with its special fragrance Weiner perceived and interpreted however more by an intuition than hard study. He was proud of it - and rightly so." In her study of Weiner's work, Marie Langerová has characterized Weiner's quest as a journalist as that of a "destroyer of national myths".

=== Writer ===
Weiner's literary work is generally divided into two distinct phases. His first poems and short stories appear to be influenced by the modernist literature of the early 20th century. At the same time he developed his own new poetics under the influence of Charles Vildrac and Georges Duhamel. Whereas Weiner did not publish any literary works for several years after 1919, he started writing prose and poetry once again when he met a group of French surrealists, including Roger Vailland, René Daumal and Roger Gilbert-Lecomte, who called themselves Le Grand Jeu (The Big Game). Between 1927 and 1933 Weiner published three more volumes of poetry, the prose work Lazebník (The Barber; 1929) and the novel Hra doopravdy (A Game for Real; 1933).

Weiner used literature as a means to explore the depths of being, while at the same time consciously reflecting the limits of language as a means of communication. Alfred Thomas argues: "Weiner's subtle fiction exposes – not the defunct status of language per se – but the fragmentation of a unified discourse subtended by a monistic, morally unambiguous truth." Referring to Weiner's homosexuality Thomas has also stressed, that Weiner's language is not emptied of meaning as some critics had insisted, but that his stories "explore the relationship between identity understood in terms of social morality and identity conceived in the subjective terms of sexuality."

With his prose Weiner reached an extreme degree of abstraction. Taking Hra doopravdy for an example, Walter Schamschula has pointed out that this novel consists of two distinct parts which are seemingly not connected to each other. But whereas the content of the first part might be accessible to the reader by viewing it as a dream, the plot is increasingly atomized in the second part. According to Schamschula critics have argued that a rational understanding of this novel is not possible, but he claims that it can nonetheless be accessed by recognizing its elaborate stage of abstraction. In particular, Schamschula stresses Weiner's commitment to the optical and to geometrical structures. Weiner's philosophy might be described as existentialism.

In his lifetime, Weiner was already viewed as a literary outsider. His works did not sell at all and after his death he fell almost into oblivion. With the exception of a small volume by Jindřich Chalupecký, founder of the Group 42, he became recognized as an important author only in the wake of the Prague Spring and particularly after 1989. Until recently, he has not been translated into English. In 2015, an English translation (by Benjamin Paloff) of Hra doopravdy (as The Game For Real) appeared on Two Lines Press.

== Works ==
- Netečný divák a jiné prósy. Fr. Borový, V Praze 1917.
- Rozcestí. Básně. Fr. Borový, V Praze 1918.
- Lítice. 2nd edition, Praha 1928.
- Mnoho nocí. Básně. Vydal Ot. Štorch-Marien, Praha 1928.
- Hra doopravdy. New edition, Mladá Fronta, Praha 1967.
- Lazebník Hra doopravdy. Odeon, Praha 1974.
- Sluncem svržený sok. Československý spisovatel, Praha 1989, ISBN 80-202-0092-4.
- Škleb. ARGO, Praha 1993, ISBN 80-85794-03-9.
- Spisy. (Works). 5 Vols., ed. by Zina Trochová. Torst, Praha 1996ff.

== Bibliography ==
- Jindřich Chalupecký: Richard Weiner. Aventinum, V Praze 1947.
- Lubomír Doležel: Radical Semantics. Franz Kafka and Richard Weiner. In: Jürgen Esser; Vilém Fried; Axel Hübler (1981). Forms and functions: papers in general, English, and applied linguistics : presented to Vilém Fried on the occasion of his sixty-fifth birthday. Gunter Narr Verlag. ISBN 978-3-87808-149-4., pp. 225–230.
- Jindřich Chalupecký: Expresionisté. Richard Weiner, Jakub Deml, Ladislav Klíma, Podivný Hašek. Torst, Praha 1992, ISBN 80-85639-00-9.
- Alfred Thomas: The Labyrinth of the Word: Truth and Representation in Czech Literature. Oldenburg, Munich 1995.
- Marie Langerova: The Ideology, Politics and Autonomous Art of Richard Weiner. (An Event in Discourse), 31 July 1998. (PDF in Czech)
- Marie Langerová: Weiner. Host, Brno 2000, ISBN 80-86055-97-3.
- Karel Srp: Nepovědomé body. Josef Šíma, Richard Weiner a skupina Le grand jeu. In: Umění.52, Nr. 1 2004, pp. 11–36.
- Filip Charvát: Richard Weiner oder Die Kunst zu scheitern. Interpretationen zum Erzählwerk; mit einer vergleichenden Studie zu Franz Kafka.Univ. Jana Evangelisty Purkyně, Ústí nad Labem 2006, ISBN 978-80-7044-766-6.
- Tomáš Jirsa: Medialita nepřítomného subjektu. Estetika absence, dianarace a postmoderní impulzy "Prázdné židle" Richarda Weinera. Svět literatury, Vol. 25, No. 55, 2017, pp. 109–131.
- Tomáš Jirsa: Portrait of Absence: The Aisthetic Mediality of Empty Chairs. Zeitschrift für Medien- und Kulturforschung, Vol. 7, No. 2, 2016, pp. 13–28.
- Tomáš Jirsa: Tváří v tvář beztvarosti. Afektivní a vizuální figury v moderní literatuře. Host, Brno 2016, ISBN 978-80-7491-793-6.
- Vanda Pickett (2006). Consciousness of fiction: structures of narrative uncertainty in the prose of Richard Weiner. Linacre College (University of Oxford).: D.Phil. thesis, degree awarded 2006.
- Dobrava Moldanová: České příběhy. Univ. U. E. Purkyně, Ústí nad Labem 2007, ISBN 978-80-7044-846-5.
- Walter Schamschula: Geschichte der tschechischen Literatur. Von der Gründung der Republik bis zur Gegenwart. Köln 2004, pp. 305–310.
- Alfred Thomas: The Bohemian Body. Gender and Sexuality in Modern Czech Culture. Univ. of Wisconsin Press, Madison, WI 2007.
- Lubomír Doležel: Studie z české literatury a poetiky. Torst, Brno 2008, ISBN 978-80-7215-337-4.
- Josef Hrdlička: Obrazy světa v české literatuře. Studie o způsobech celku; Komenský, Mácha, Šlejhar, Weiner. 1. Auflage. Malvern, Praha 2008, ISBN 978-80-86702-41-4.
- Petr Málek: Melancholie moderny. Alegorie, vypravěč, smrt. Dauphin, Praha 2008, ISBN 978-80-7272-167-2.
