= Václav Černý =

Václav Černý may refer to:

- Václav Černý (writer) (1905–1987), Czech writer
- Václav Černý (footballer) (born 1997), Czech footballer
