= Jana Šindelová =

Czech printmaker (born 1970)

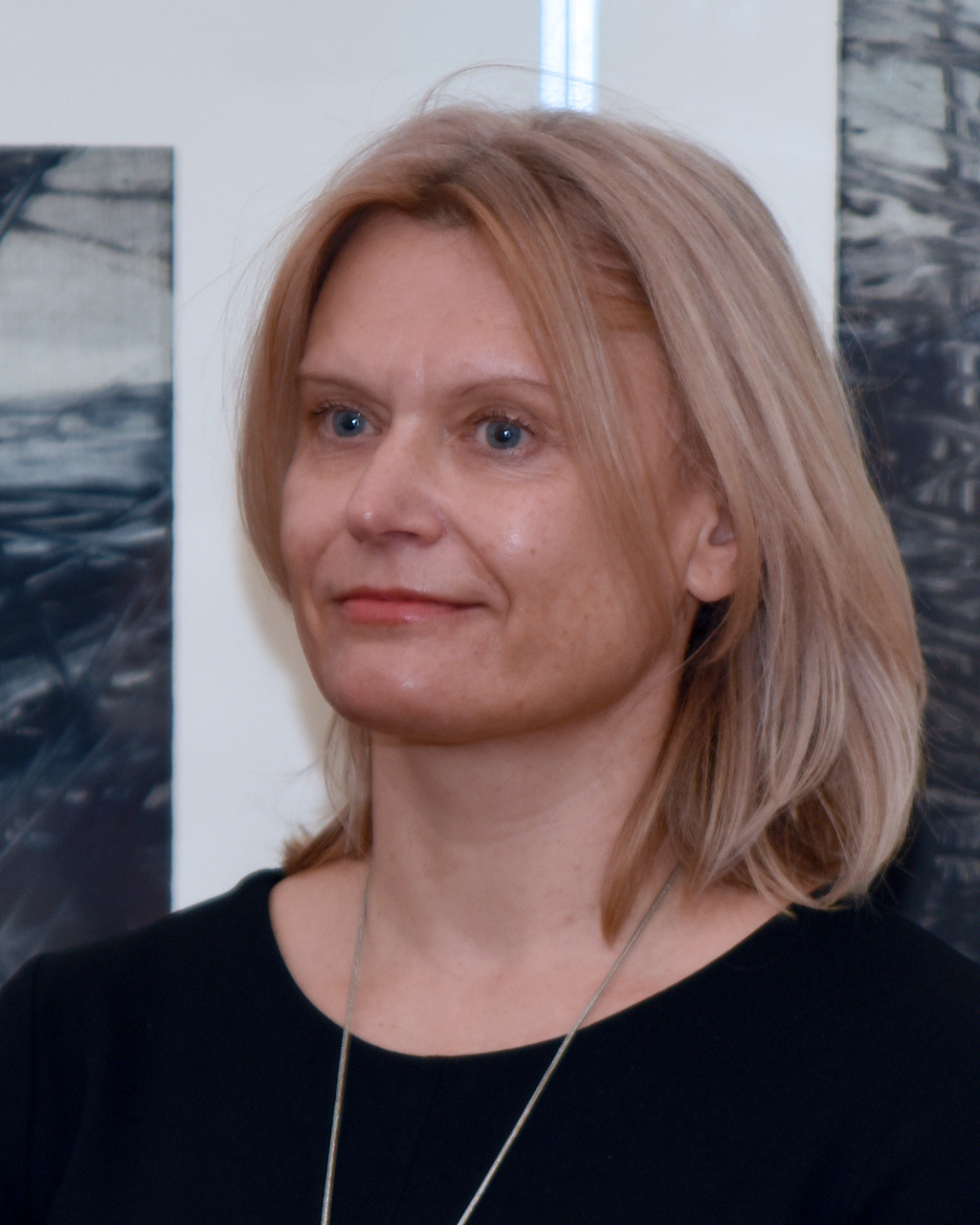
Jana Šindelová (2022)

Jana Šindelová (born 1970) is a Czech printmaker.

Born in Šternberk, Šindelová studied under Jiří Lindovský at the Academy of Fine Arts in Prague from 1994 until 2000. Other instructors have included Milan Knížák. She joined the artists' organization Hollar in 2014. During her career she has exhibited her work both in the Czech Republic and abroad, and she has won a variety of awards. Her 1996 print Bez názvu/Untitled, an etching with mixed media, is owned by the National Gallery of Art.
