= Jiří Kotalík =

Czech art historian and director

Jiří Kotalík (22 July 1920 – 26 January 1996) was a Czech art historian. He was the director of the National Gallery Prague from 1967 to 1990. He was one of the members of Group 42. Kotalík remained at the National Gallery until his retirement in 1990.
