= Rudolf Rabl =

Czech lawyer

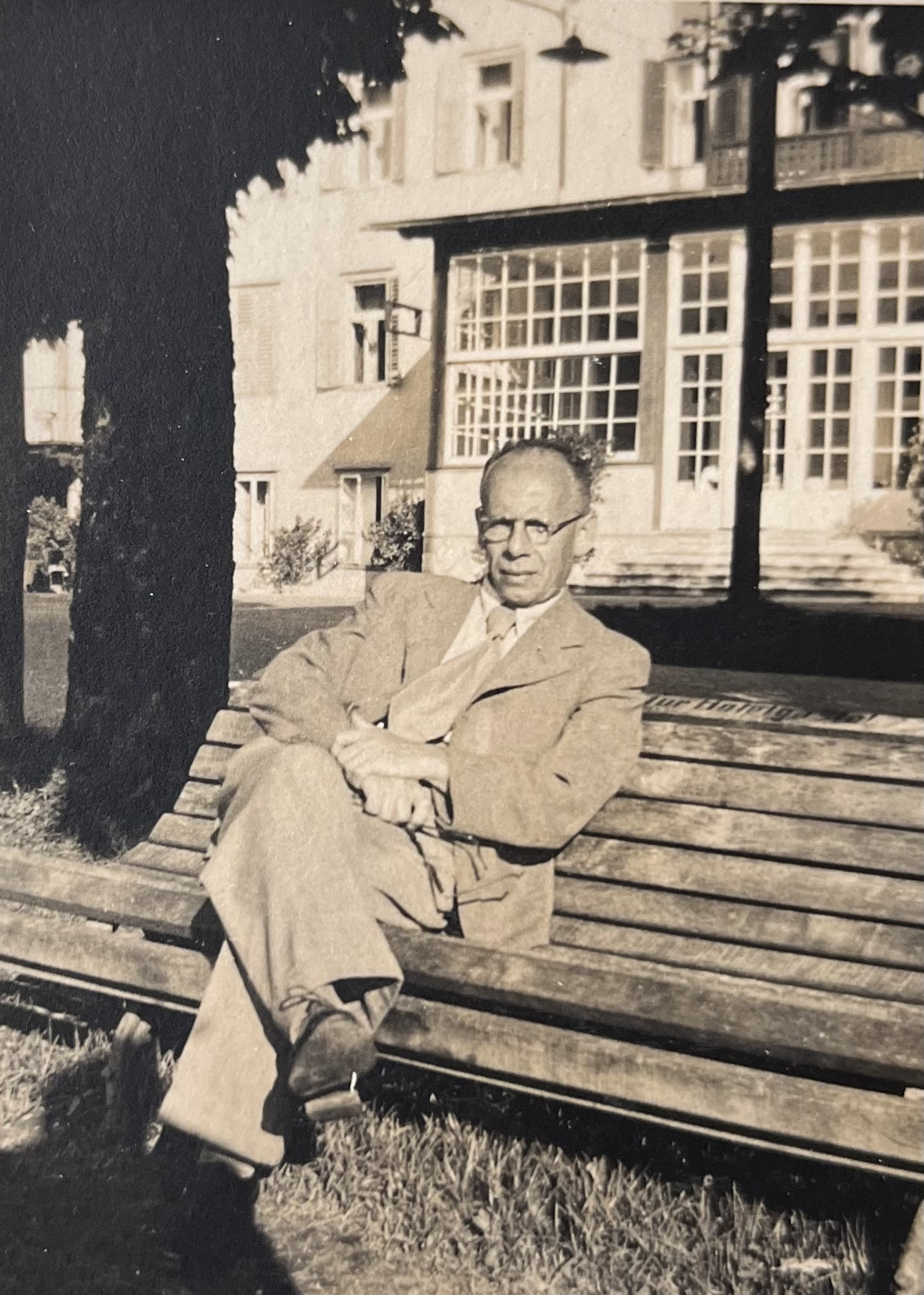
- Born: 23 March 1889; Jindřichův Hradec, Bohemia, Austria-Hungary
- Died: 20 August 1951 (aged 62); Newcastle upon Tyne, United Kingdom
- Education: Charles University; University of Pisa; University of Vienna
- Known for: Legal work, role in Czechoslovak government-in-exile

Rudolf Rabl (23 March 1889 – 20 August 1951) was a Czech lawyer, writer, art collector and member of the Czechoslovak government-in-exile in 1940–1945.

== Early life and education ==
Rabl was born into a German-speaking assimilated Jewish family in southern Bohemia. The Rabls had lived in the Czech lands (Bohemia) since the late 15th century.

He studied law at Charles University in Prague, the University of Pisa, and the University of Vienna. He received his doctorate in law from Charles University in 1913 and a second doctorate in history of art from the Vienna School of Art History in 1916.

== Legal career ==
Rabl became an advocate in the high court and supreme court, and was involved in a number of high profile cases within Czechoslovakia and Austria.

From 1933 he acted on behalf of political and Jewish refugees wishing to flee to Czechoslovakia and co-founded the Czech Association for the Support of German Emigrants (Sdružení k podpoře německých emigrantů) in Prague, which was active throughout Czechoslovakia and was primarily made up of activists from the Czechoslovak section of the International Red Aid (which had been dissolved in 1932).

== Czechoslovak government-in-exile ==
Rabl became a member of the Czechoslovak government-in-exile in London in 1940. In this position he was able to use some influence to secure safe passage for several Jewish academics and political refugees.

He made regular broadcasts on BBC Radio during the war in both Czech and English. Czech historian Livia Rothkirchen described Rabl as being a member of "the cream of the cultural elite" in Europe.

== Personal life ==
Rabl had socialist sympathies and had an extensive art collection, including artwork by his friend Oskar Kokoschka. His first cousin was the writer Richard Weiner.

His first wife, Jula, died on 30 August 1939. He later married an English woman and had a daughter, Elizabeth Jula Rabl (b. 1944).
