= Běla Kolářová =

- Běla Kolářová, 1969
- Born: Běla Helclová; 24 March 1923; Terezín, Czechia
- Died: 12 April 2010 (aged 87); Prague, Czech Republic
- Known for: Photography
- Spouse: Jiří Kolář (m. 1949; died in 2002)

Běla Kolářová née Helclová (24 March 1923, in Terezín – 12 April 2010, in Prague) was a Czech artist and photographer. In 1949 she married Jiří Kolář (1914-2002). In 1985, she followed her husband in exile in Paris. They returned to Prague in 1999. She died in Prague on 12 April 2010.

== Style ==
Kolářová belongs to the generation which touched off an iconoclastic revolution and "rearmament" in Czech art during the 1960s. This new wave hit the scene with a program of objective tendencies, proclaiming that art can exist as a process, concept, method, experiment and language, or as something "concrete"—such as a found and designed object. Kolářová’s training is in photography, and her role in the 1960s reversal was associated with this medium from the beginning. As with many of her contemporaries, she arrived at the conclusion that it is not possible to photograph the world, i.e. to use classic methods of representing reality.

She therefore invented her own method and technology, the artificial negative. She pressed small objects into layers of paraffin on small pieces of cellophane, or she actually applied small fragments of natural and artificial materials. Instead of choosing the world that it is possible to photograph and represent as an exterior appearance, she chose the world that is possible to accept, to appropriate as an assemblage of material fragments, using light to transfer them into an autonomous picture on the sensitive surface of photographic paper.

Her path began in doubt. She doubted the meaning of photography, despite considering it her personal medium. Reflecting on this in 1968, she asked herself, "Was there really nothing left but to add the things we see to those already seen a hundred times over, to keep reshaping that which has long been discovered?" From this sense of distrust, she developed a form of experimental photography that was close to the principles of the 1920s movement, New Vision. The artist stated, "Gradually I begun to perceive a world which, in fact, was left out unnoticed by photographers. A world so negligible and everyday as if past the merit of being photographed. Small things, indispendable for our life yet taken for granted so that we can hardly notice them in spite of their great number..." [Bèla Kolářová, 'One of the Ways,' in Bèla Kolářová. cat. Raven Row (London, 2013),10-14]

For some time, Kolárová worked without a camera. She arranged bits of paper, thread, or shards on transparent film, or pressed them like stamps, into a coat of paraffin. She then exposed these compositions and called them "artificial negatives." These were similar to the cliché verre process.

After this phase, she photographed regular objects: household objects, eggshells, crow caps. These systematic formations of ordinary objects initiated her next artistic phase, around 1964. She removed the mediating camera and turned to assemblage. Marie Klimešová notes, Kolářová took recourse here to the modernist or minimalist model of the grid. She did this deliberately to limit the role of the artist's "signature" in favor of a conceptualism that was still unusual.

She was inspired by the constructivist-geometrical program of the group Křižovatka that she was part of along with her husband and fellow artists Zdeněk Sýkora and Karel Malich. Kolárová was never devoted to purely rational, completely self-sufficient structure.

A tension filled geometry of intimacy emerged in the late 1970s. She started to use cosmetics to draw. She used lipstick, eyeshadow, eyeliner, and similar. While working this way, she still remained faithful to the grid model while mixing it with a colorful symbolism of femininity.

== Career ==
Kolářová's work has been exhibited extensively since the 1960s. In 1966, the Gallery in Charles Square in Prague held her first solo exhibition. By the 1980s, Kolářová's work included more assemblages. In 1994, she participated in the group exhibition Europa, Europa. Das Jahrhundert der Avantgarde in Mittel- und Osteuropa (Europe, Europe. The Century of the Avant-garde in Central and Eastern Europe) at the Kunst- und Ausstellungshalle der Bundesrepublik Deutschland in Bonn. Her work continues to be exhibited posthumously. Her work was included in the 2021 exhibition Women in Abstraction at the Centre Pompidou.

Her work is owned by the Moravian Gallery in Brno, the Musée National d'Art Moderne in Paris, the National Gallery in Prague, the Museum of Decorative Arts in Prague, and the Olomouc Museum of Art. In 2017 the Metropolitan Museum of Art acquired an early piece entitled "Letters From Portugal".

== Bibliography ==
- Kolářová, Běla (1999), Objekty a asambláže, Praha: Torst, ISBN 80-85639-15-7
- Kolářová, Běla (2003), Běla Kolářová, Praha: Arbor vitae, ISBN 80-86300-38-2
- Valoch, Jiří (2006), Běla Kolářová, Praha: Národní galerie, ISBN 80-7035-324-4
- Kolářová, Běla (2008), Běla Kolářová, Praha: Museum Kampa, ISBN 978-80-254-2502-2
