= Ladislav Zívr =

Czech sculptor (1909–1980)

Ladislav Zívr (23 May 1909 – 4 September 1980) was a Czech sculptor.

Zívr was born in Nová Paka and died in Ždírec (a hamlet in Levínská Olešnice), Czechoslovakia (now the Czech Republic).

Because of family tradition he attended pottery school, and clay remained his preferred material, although he used other techniques as well, such as mixed media or a combination of gypsum with natural materials. His works were inspired mostly by Cubism and Surrealism.

He later attended the Academy of Arts, Architecture and Design in Prague in Prague, where he met with the era's avant-garde artists. He was a member of the Group 42 art group, where he was the only sculptor.
