= Levínská Olešnice =

- Municipality
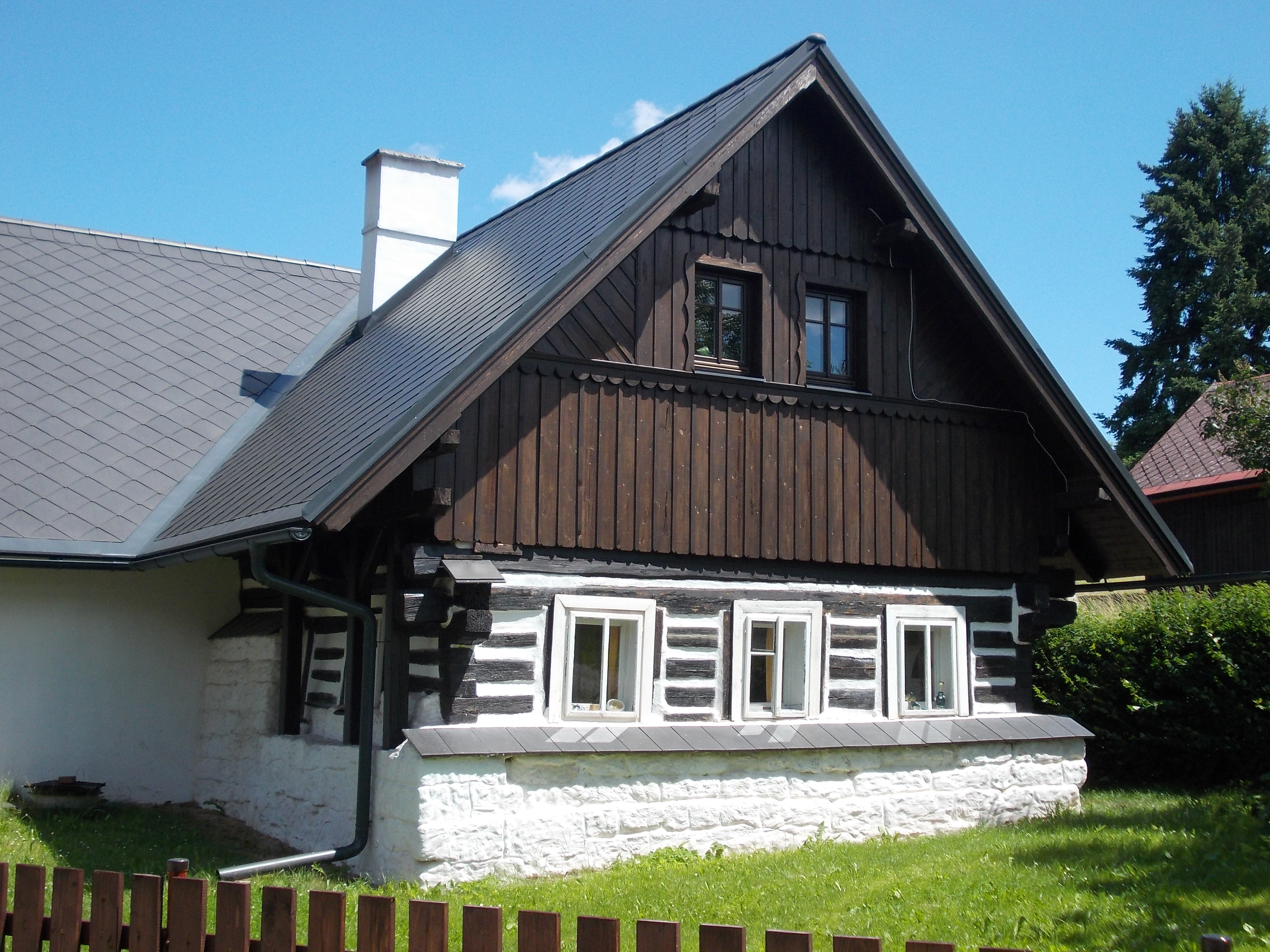
- House No. 28, a traditional log building

- Flag Coat of arms

- Location in the Czech Republic
- Coordinates: 50°31′42″N 15°32′27″E
- Country: Czech Republic
- Region: Liberec
- District: Semily
- First mentioned: 1384

Area
  - Total: 10.05 km^{2} (3.88 sq mi)
- Elevation: 472 m (1,549 ft)

Population (2026-01-01)
  - Total: 330
  - Density: 33/km^{2} (85/sq mi)
- Time zone: UTC+1 (CET)
  - Summer (DST): UTC+2 (CEST)
- Postal codes: 507 91, 514 01
- Website: www.levinskaolesnice.cz

Levínská Olešnice is a municipality and village in Semily District in the Liberec Region of the Czech Republic. It has about 300 inhabitants.

== Administrative division ==
Levínská Olešnice consists of two municipal parts (in brackets population according to the 2021 census):

- Levínská Olešnice (276)
- Žďár (64)

== Demographics ==
Historical population
Year	Pop.	±%
1869	1,483	—
1880	1,388	−6.4%
1890	1,354	−2.4%
1900	1,276	−5.8%
1910	1,193	−6.5%
1921	1,116	−6.5%
1930	982	−12.0%
1950	655	−33.3%
1961	607	−7.3%
1970	476	−21.6%
1980	429	−9.9%
1991	372	−13.3%
2001	379	+1.9%
2011	349	−7.9%
2021	340	−2.6%
Source: Censuses

== Notable people ==
- Ladislav Zívr (1909–1980), sculptor; died here
