= Jiřina Hauková =

Czech poet and translator (1919–2005)

Jiřina Hauková (January 27, 1919, Přerov – December 15, 2005) was a Czech poet and translator. She was a member of the Group 42 (Skupina 42), together with her husband Jindřich Chalupecký.

== Biography ==
Having graduated from a grammar school in 1939, she started to study philosophy in Brno, where she stayed until the Nazi occupants closed all universities. After that she worked as an editor in Obzor (The Horizon) in Přerov. She finished her studies in 1949 at the Charles University in Prague. Until 1950, when she started career as a professional writer, she worked for the Ministry of Information. After 1968 she was banned to publish and some of her works were published abroad. Apart from her own books of poetry, she was a celebrated translator from English. She translated The Waste Land (together with her husband) in 1947, and also books by Edgar Allan Poe, John Keats, Emily Dickinson and Dylan Thomas. She was Thomas’ interpreter and guide when he visited Prague in March 1949 to attend a writers’ conference. She has given an account of Thomas’ visit in her memoirs, Záblesky života, which has been partly reproduced in an English translation.

In 1996 she received, together with the poet Zbyněk Hejda, the prestigious Jaroslav Seifert Award for the outstanding lifetime contribution to the Czech literature.

== Bibliography ==
=== Poetry ===
- Přísluní, 1943
- Cizí pokoj, 1946
- Oheň ve sněhu, 1958
- Rozvodí času, 1970
- Spodní proudy, abroad 1988, in the Czech Republic 1992
- Motýl a smrt, 1990
- Světlo září, 1995
- Mozaika z vedřin, 1997
- Básně, 2000 (Collected Poems)
- Večerní prška, 2002

=== Memoirs ===
- Záblesky života, 1996
