= Studio International =

British magazine

- Categories: Contemporary art
- Frequency: Bi-monthly
- Publisher: The Studio Trust
- Founded: 1964
- Final issue Number: 1993; 201 (1022/23)
- Country: United Kingdom
- Based in: London
- Language: English
- Website: studio-international.co.uk
- ISSN: 0039-4114

Studio International is an international illustrated contemporary art magazine, formerly published in hard copy in London from 1964 until 1992, and electronically published since 2000. It incorporated an earlier magazine, The Studio: An Illustrated Magazine of Fine and Applied Art, and was sometimes titled Studio International, incorporating The Studio. Other issues are named Studio International: Journal of Modern Art. Six issues per year were published until July 1992, when regular physical publication ended. A single issue, volume 201 number 1022/23, appeared in 1993 for the centenary of The Studio.

A year-book on architecture and interior design, Decorative Art in Modern Interiors, was published until 1980.

In 2000, the title was relaunched as an internet-based e-magazine; from 2005, some of the content has been published in yearbooks.
