= Cross-Currents =

- Discipline: East Asian studies
- Language: English
- Edited by: Sungtaek Cho and Wen-hsin Yeh

Publication details
- History: 2011–2020
- Publisher: University of Hawai'i Press
- Frequency: quarterly
- Open access: Yes
- License: Creative Commons Attribution-NonCommercial-NoDerivs 3.0 United States License

Standard abbreviations
- ISO 4: Cross-Currents

Indexing
- ISSN: 2158-9666 (print); 2158-9674 (web)

Links
- Journal homepage

Cross-Currents: East Asian History and Culture Review was a peer-reviewed open access scholarly journal on East Asian history and culture. It was a joint enterprise of the Research Institute of Korean Studies (RIKS) at Korea University and the Institute of East Asian Studies (IEAS) at the University of California, Berkeley. The current editors-in-chief were Sungtaek Cho (Korea University) and Wen-hsin Yeh (UC Berkeley). It was published by the University of Hawaiʻi Press. The title ceased publication after vol. 9 no. 1 in 2020.
