= Bohumír Matal =

Czech painter (1922–1988)

Bohumír Matal (13 February 1922, Brno – 7 July 1988, Prudká) was a Czech painter, and one of the youngest members of Group 42.

== Life ==
Bohumír Matal studied at the School of Arts and Crafts in Brno with E. Hrbek, František Václav Süsser from 1937 through 1941. In 1941 he was arrested for antifascist activity and sent to the Lohbruck labor camp in Germany, where he worked in a chain factory. Although he couldn't paint anymore, he wrote letters to his family accompanied with his own illustrations. During his stay in the labor camp he wrote more than 200 letters with black and white pencil drawings.

In 1945 he returned from Germany in ill health. After his recovery he started to paint again. Following an exhibition with other young painters in Paris in 1946, he had his first solo exhibition. Some of the most recurring themes in his work were urban civilization and industrialization - cement plants, paper mills etc. His first paintings feature airships, ports and streets in the rain; gradually, his work was connected with the program of Group 42.

In 1948, Matal painted mostly portraits, including the Cyclist series (1952-54). In the first half of the 1950s the political situation changed and Matal, together with Vladislav Vaculka and Vladimír Vašíček, founded Group Brno 57.

In the 1960s experimentation and subtraction appeared in Matal's artwork. He also started working in scene design. In 1968 he left Brno and moved to Prudká at Doubravník, where he bought and renewed a mill as a studio. He died there after a long illness on July 7, 1988.
