= Kamil Lhoták =

Czech painter, graphic artist and illustrator

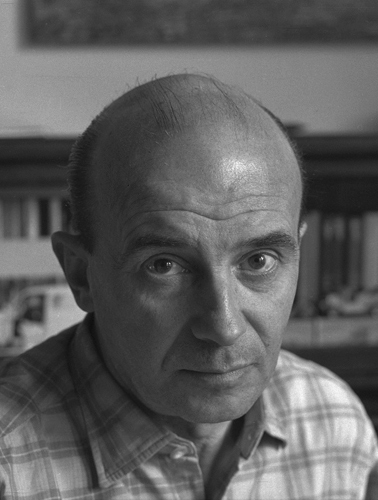
- Portrait of Kamil Lhoták by Karel Kuklík, 1960s
- Born: 25 July 1912; Prague, Austria-Hungary
- Died: 22 October 1990 (aged 78); Prague, Czechoslovakia
- Known for: Painting

Kamil Lhoták (25 July 1912 Prague – 22 October 1990, Prague) was a Czech painter, graphic artist, and illustrator. He was one of the members of Group 42.

== Biography ==
Kamil Lhoták was born on 25 July 1912 in Prague-Holešovice. His mother, Anna Kouglová, met and befriended young medical student Kamil Lhoták at the ball in Žofín. The couple never married but, they produced one child from their long-term relationship. Unequal social status and fears of damaging his career led Lhoták's father to hide his illegitimate son. However, he financially supported him and his mother his whole life. Lhoták Sr. was involved in viral research and experimented with the serum against poliomyelitis. During a rare visit with his family, he infected his young son with this disease. The effects of poliomyelitis deeply influenced Lhoták's health. The relationship between Lhoták father and son was complicated and traumatic.

Thanks to his mother, Lhoták became familiar with painting and literature at a young age. He was particularly fond of the works of Jules Verne, Edouard Riou, and Henri de Toulouse-Lautrec. His early artworks were influenced also by modern technical inventions; he often created drawings of cars, motorcycles, and bicycles.

In 1932 he began his studies at Jirásek Gymnasium in Prague. Together with his classmate he published "Auto-moto zpravodaj" (Auto-Moto News) and later he participated in publishing school magazine "Hledání umění". He also often visited the expositions of modern art in Aventinum.

Following his graduation at the gymnasium he continued studying at the Faculty of Law of Charles University. Even during these studies, he devoted himself to painting rather than law.

In 1938 he married Hertha Guthová, and a year later he organized his first exhibition in Beaufort Gallery in Jungmannova Street. In 1940 he became a member of the art association Umělecká beseda. During the World War II Lhoták created hundreds of artworks, and he also helped to establish the significant Czech art association Group 42. The first exhibition of the group was organized in 1943. According to Czech painter Libor Fára, one of Lhoták's presented paintings, "Dcera velkoměsta" (Daughter of a City), later caught the attention of Pablo Picasso at the exhibition in Paris.

In 1954, Lhoták began his collaboration with writer Adolf Branald. Together they created a book Dědeček automobil (Grandfather Automobile). Lhoták later considered his illustrations for this book as his best works. A year later, in 1955, they cooperated on the production of the film Dědeček automobil.

In the 1960s he met Anna Endrštová, who became his model and life partner. During the 1960s and 1970s he increased his work activities, annually creating a large number of paintings and book illustrations and also helping with exhibitions. His paintings from that time are influenced by modern art and op-art. He also took inspiration from the works of Roy Lichtenstein.

Lhoták continued his work in later life, creating in 1990 his last painting, "Meteor padá do moře" (Meteor Falls to the Sea). He died on 22 October 1990 in Prague.

== Style ==
Lhoták was an entirely self-taught painter, and he developed his style in an individual and original way. His paintings are based on a specific poetic view, and it is almost impossible to classify them into art genres. Technology and its inventions from the beginning of the 20th century, and particularly the pioneering inventions of motoring, aviation, and the railroads became his main source of inspiration. In his works, Lhoták also included the motives of the Prague periphery. Despite the dreamy atmosphere and poetic character, Lhoták's paintings retain strong reference to the real world and remain solely figurative.

Lhoták's style was significantly influenced by poetry, and especially by the works of Czech poets Jan Hanč and Ivan Blatný, fellow members of Group 42. During the years he adapted his style to various modern trends, but he managed to maintain his originality and specific artistic expression. He intentionally used some elements of naïve art and his works are well received for their directness and understandability.

== Selected exhibitions ==
- 1967 - Haus der Tschechoslowakischen Kultur, Berlin
- 1969 - Mahlerstraβe Gallery, Vienna
- 1977 - Galerie Kniha, Prague
- 1980 - Dům umění, Zlín
- 1986 - City Gallery Prague
- 1987 - Old City Town Hall, Prague

== See also ==
- Group 42
