= Group 42 =

1940s Czech artistic group

Group 42 (Czech: Skupina 42) was a Czech artistic group officially established on 27 November 1942 (though its roots date to 1938–1939, forming in 1940). The group's activity ceased in 1948 when they were banned by the government, but its influence on Czech literature and Czech art was still evident in further years.

This group was primarily influenced by civilism, cubism, futurism, constructivism, existentialism, and surrealism, and their work revealed a characteristic fascination with technology, evident in their frequent focus on cities, factories, industry, and machines. The human characters are generally common townspeople.

The article The World We Live In (Czech: Svět, v němž žijeme) by Jindřich Chalupecký provided Group 42's primary theoretical foundation.

== Members ==
=== Poets ===
- Ivan Blatný
- Jan Hanč
- Jiřina Hauková
- Josef Kainar
- Jiří Kolář (also a visual artist)

=== Painters ===
- František Gross
- František Hudeček
- Jan Kotík
- Kamil Lhoták
- Bohumír Matal
- Jan Smetana
- Karel Souček

=== Carver ===
- Ladislav Zívr

=== Photographer ===
- Miroslav Hák

=== Theoreticians ===
- Jindřich Chalupecký
- Jiří Kotalík
