= Václav Černý (writer) =

Czech literary scholar, writer and philosopher(1905-1987)

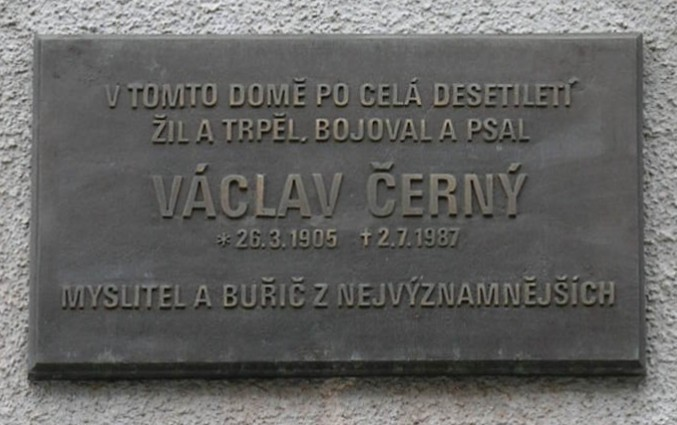
Plaque in Zelená Street, Prague, Dejvice.

Václav Černý (26 March 1905, Jizbice – 2 July 1987, Prague) was a Czech literary scholar, writer and philosopher. He was an enthusiast of Spanish literature and philosophy and translated into Czech a number of literary and philosophical works by Spanish writers as Ortega y Gasset, Unamuno and Cervantes.

== Bibliography ==
- Lidové kořeny současného umění, 1929
- Karel Čapek, 1936
- Esej o básnickém baroku, 1937
- Meditace o romantickém neklidu, 1943
- Boje a směry socialistické kultury, 1946
- Prvý sešit existencialismu, 1947
- Druhý sešit existencialismu, published in 1992 together with "První sešit existencialismu"
- Osobnost tvorba a boj, 1947
- Středověká milostná lyrika, 1948
- Jaroslav Seifert, 1954
- Staročeský mastičkář, 1955
- Lid a literatura ve středověku, zvláště pak v románských zemích, 1958
- Knížka o Babičce, 1963
- Středověké drama, 1964
- Studie ze starší světové literatury, 1969
- Studie a eseje z moderní světové literatury, 1969
- Až do předsíně nebes : čtrnáct studií o baroku našem i cizím, 1972, published in 1996
- O povaze naší kultury, 1981
- Paměti, three parts, originally published abroad, in the Czech Republic in 1992–1993
- Úvod do literární historie, texts of seminars from years 1969/1970, published posthumously in 1993
- Eseje o české a slovenské próze , 1994
- V zúženém prostoru, 1994
- Skutečnost a svoboda, 1995
- Vývoj a zločiny panslavismu, 1995
