= Czech and Slovak pavilion =

Venice Biennale national pavilion

Coordinates: 45.4283°N 12.3586°E

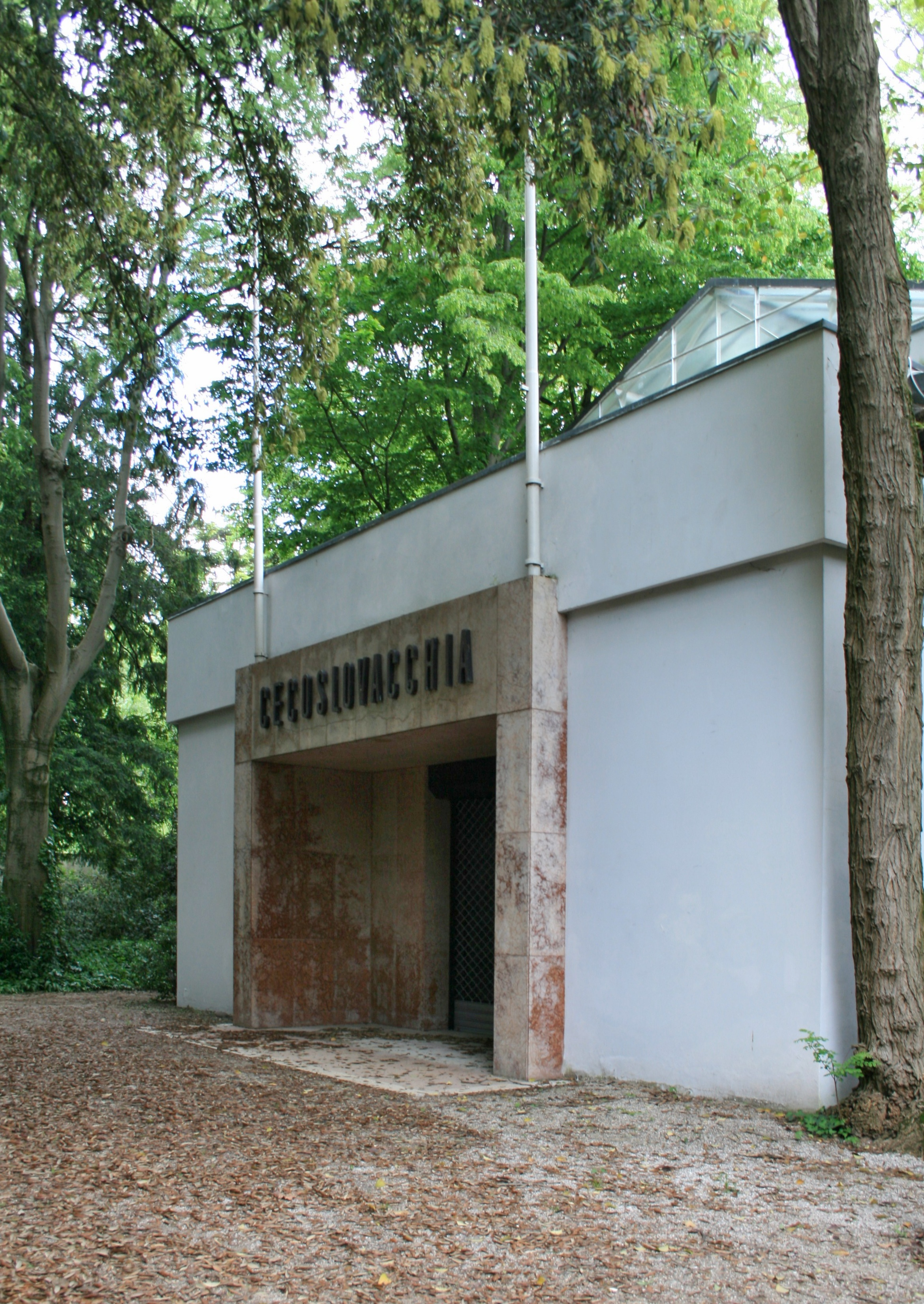
The pavilion in 2010

The Czech and Slovak pavilion houses the national representation of the Czech Republic and Slovakia during the Venice Biennale arts festivals.

== Background ==
The Venice Biennale is an international art biennial exhibition held in Venice, Italy. Often described as "the Olympics of the art world", participation in the Biennale is a prestigious event for contemporary artists. The festival has become a constellation of shows: a central exhibition curated by that year's artistic director, national pavilions hosted by individual nations, and independent exhibitions held throughout Venice. The Biennale's parent organisation also runs regular festivals in other arts: architecture, dance, film, music and theatre.

Outside the central international exhibition, individual nations produce their own shows, known as pavilions, as their national representation. Nations that own their pavilion buildings – such as the 30 housed in the Giardini – are responsible for their own upkeep and construction costs as well. Nations without dedicated buildings create pavilions in venues throughout the city.

== Organization and building ==
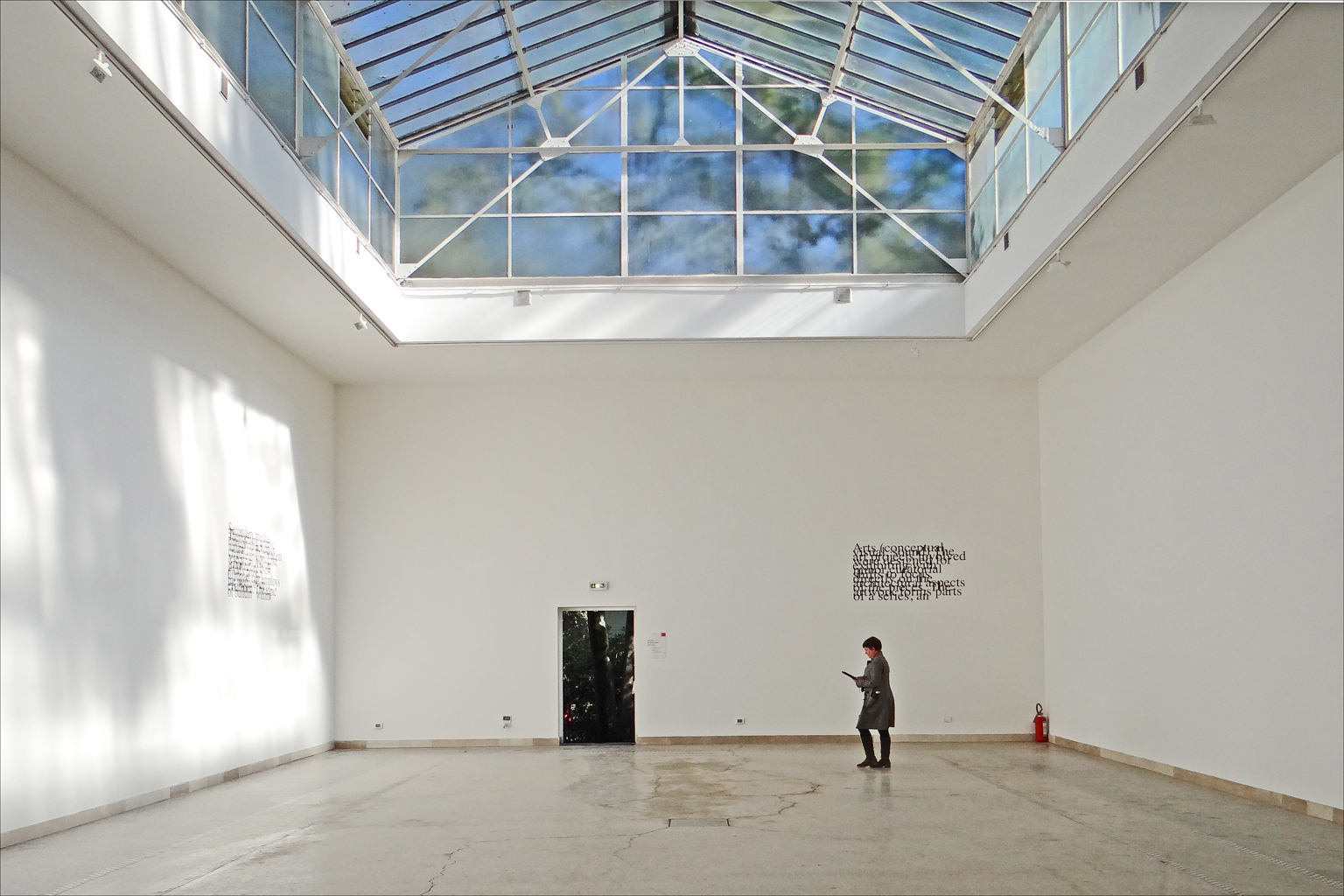
Interior, 2010

Architect Otakar Novotny designed the pavilion for Czechoslovakia in 1926 with strong influence from Cubism and European functionalism.

== Representation by year ==
=== Art ===
- 1926 — Charlotte Schrötter-Radnitz
- 1942 — Janko Alexy, Miloš Alexander Bazovský, Martin Benka, Ľudovít Fulla, Jan Hála, Jozef Kollar, Frantisek Kudlac, Eugen Lehotský, Gustáv Mallý, Peter Matejka, Lea Mrazova, Jan Mudroch, Karol Ondreička, Štefan Polkoráb, Teodor Tekel, Jaroslav Votruba, Júlia Kováciková-Horová, Vojtech Ihrisky, Jan Koniarek, Jozef Kostka, Ladislav Majerský, Fraňo Stefunko, Koloman Sokol
- 1956 — Josef Lada, Adolf Zábranský, Jiří Trnka, Antonín Pelc, Cyril Bouda, Václav Karel, Kamil Lhoták, Antonín Strnadel, Vincenc Vingler, a.o.
- 1964 — Vladimír Kompánek
- 1966 — Jozef Kornúcik, Vladimír Kompánek
- 1970 — Jozef Jankovič
- 1986 — Ivan Ouhel
- 1993 — František Skála, Daniel Fischer
- 1995 — Jozef Jankovič
- 1999 — (Curators: Petra Hanáková and Alexandra Kusá)
- 2001 — Jiří Surůvka, Ilona Németh (Curator: Katarína Rusnáková)
- 2005 — Stanislav Filko, Jan Mančuška, Boris Ondreička (Curator: Marek Pokorný)
- 2007 — Irena Jůzová (Curator: Tomáš Vlček)
- 2009 — Roman Ondak (Curator: Kathrin Rhomberg)
- 2011 — Dominik Lang (Curator: Yvona Ferencová)
- 2013 — Petra Feriancová, Zbyněk Baladrán (Curator: Marek Pokorný)
- 2015 — Jiří David (Curator: Katarína Rusnáková, Commissioner: Adam Budak)
- 2017 — Jana Želibská
- 2019 — Stanislav Kolíbal (Curator: Dieter Bogner, Commissioner: Adam Budak)

== Bibliography ==
- Russeth, Andrew (April 17, 2019). "The Venice Biennale: Everything You Could Ever Want to Know". ARTnews.
- Volpi, Cristiana (2013). "Czech Republic and Slovakia". In Re Rebaudengo, Adele (ed.). Pavilions and Garden of Venice Biennale. Rome: Contrasto. p. 172. ISBN 978-88-6965-440-4.
