= Mainer =

Mainer may refer to:

- Mainer (American), a person from Maine
- Mainer (magazine), an alternative magazine published in Portland, Maine, now known as The Bollard
- Mainer, the people of U.S. state Maine
- Martin Mainer (born 1959), Czech artist and professor
- J. E. Mainer (1908–1971), American old time fiddler
- Wade Mainer (1907–2011), American singer and banjoist
