= Lukáš Hofmann =

- Born: 22 February 1993 (age 33); Prague, Czech Republic
- Occupation: Artist
- Awards: Jindřich Chalupecký Award (2018)

Lukáš Hofmann (born 22 February 1993) is a Czech curator, casting director and interdisciplinary artist. His work revolves around performance, installation art and fashion practice. In 2018, Hofmann won the Jindřich Chalupecký Award.

Hofmann's recent works include Sospiri and Retrospective performances at the National Gallery Prague, Phantom Limb performance at National Gallery of Denmark, big bag with Barbara Klawitter and Nico Arauner at Moderna Museet, l'eau des algues with Nils Lange at Cabaret Voltaire, for the closing of Manifesta 11, Enzyme at Galerie Frangulyan, classic arrangement of four white roses in collaboration with Dan Bodan at the Schinkel Pavillon, Dry Me a River at a 5000 sqm cleared out Bauhaus hobby market for Plato Ostrava and IKEA Made Fashion, hosted at Galerie AVU.
