= Rodney Ewing =

Rodney Ewing may refer to:

- Rodney Ewing (artist) (born 1964), African-American artist
- Rodney C. Ewing (1946–2024), American mineralogist, materials scientist and nuclear safety expert
