= Derricotte =

Derricotte is a surname. Notable people with the surname include:

- Cheryl Derricotte, American visual artist
- Gene Derricotte (1926–2023), American college football player
- Juliette Derricotte (1897–1931), American educationist and political activist
- Toi Derricotte (born 1941), American poet
