= Jiří Černický =

Czech visual artist

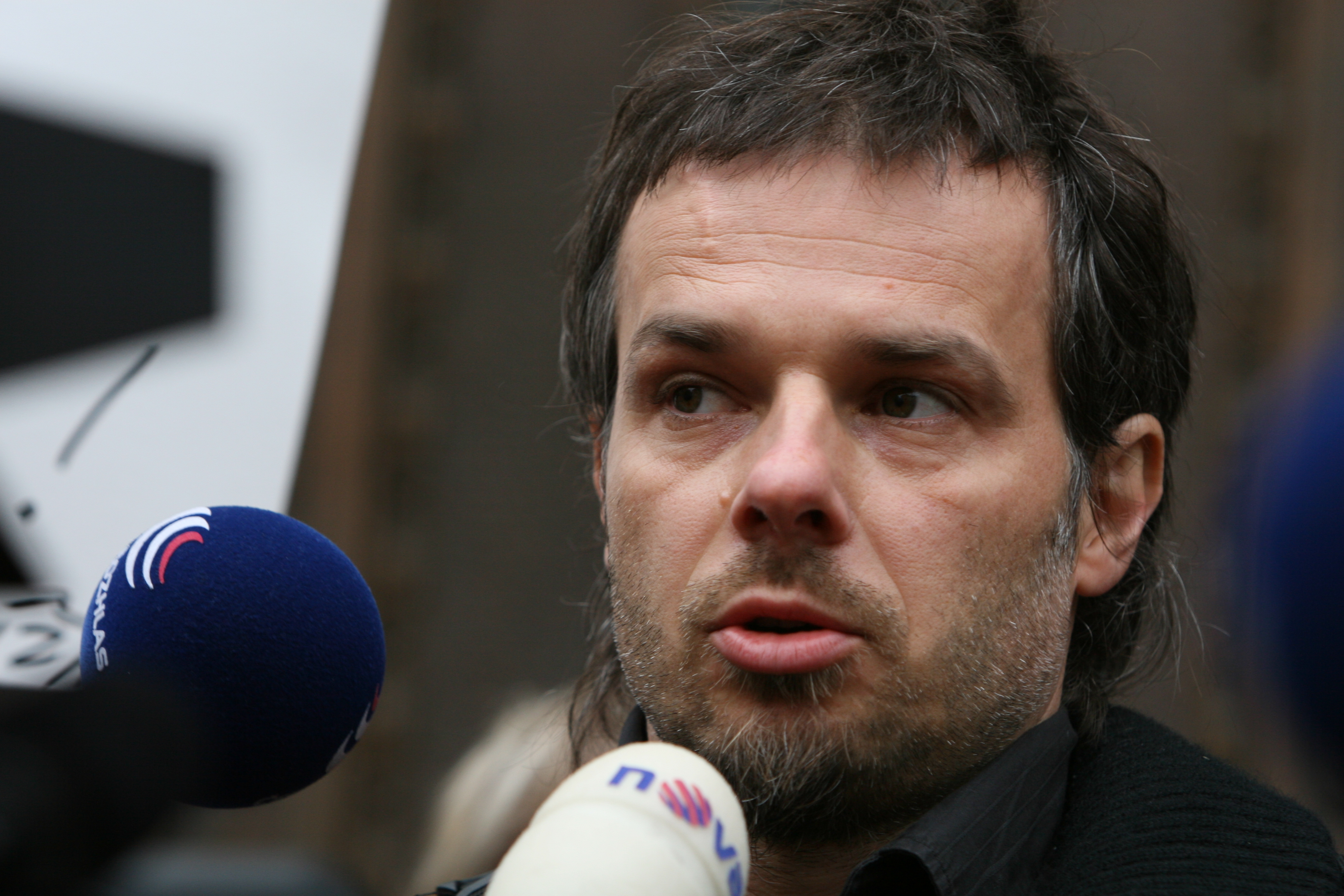
- Jiří Černický in 2007
- Born: 1 August 1966 (age 59); Ústí nad Labem, Czechoslovakia
- Education: Academy of Fine Arts in Prague Academy of Arts, Architecture & Design in Prague Faculty of Art and Design, Jan Evangelista Purkyně University in Ústí nad Labem
- Occupations: Visual artist, painter, sculptor
- Style: Intermedia
- Website: cernicky.com

Jiří Černický (born 1 August 1966) is a Czech visual artist. He is known for experimental intermedia projects involving video art, visual poetry and photography. He is a winner of the Jindřich Chalupecký Award, the Soros Award and the 48th October Salon Award (in Belgrade, Serbia), and was a finalist for the Alice Francis Award.

== Career ==
Černický first studied art in Ústí nad Labem from 1987 to 1990, before moving to Prague in 1990 to attend the Academy of Arts, Architecture and Design, moving to the Academy of Fine Arts in 1993, where he studied until 1997.

He first received attention for outlandish projects, such as, in 1993, collecting tears from people in the street, which he then took to an Ethiopian monastery. His projects are varied, but usually depict hypothetical subjects. Černický combines various media in exhibitions, alternating between easel painting, objects, video and photography. He also uses action art and new media technologies. His work often features strong emotions, social commentary, and ironic humor. Other examples of Černický's works include tools for taking drugs made of cut glass, a tattooed sausage, a glass model of a nuclear explosion, a striped series of paintings, an ornamental series on terrorism, monochrome images with a silicon structure, a monument in the form of an information board at a railway station with philosophical texts, videos about the movement of the speed of light, the “Gagarin Thing”, and a white motorcycle helmet imitating Munch’s The Scream.

In 1998, Černický won the Jindřich Chalupecký Award. In 2015 he was appointed Associate Professor at the Faculty of Art and Design, Jan Evangelista Purkyně University in Ústí nad Labem.

=== Awards ===
- 2007 – 48th October Salon Award, Beograd, Serbia
- 1998 – The Jindřich Chalupecký Award, Prague
- 1996 – The Soros Award, Prague
- 2012 – Finalist of the Alice Francis Award

== Exhibitions ==
=== Public collections ===
- National Gallery, Prague, Czech Republic
- Prague City Gallery, Czech Republic
- Museum of Contemporary Art, Miami, USA
- Museum for Applied Art / Contemporary Art, Vienna, Austria
- Musee d’Art Moderne, Saint Etienne, France

=== Exhibitions ===
- Galerie Rudolfinum, Prague, Czech Republic, "Jiří Černický: Wild Dreams" (2016).

=== Residencies ===
- Akademie der Künste, Berlin, Germany
- Tent Gallery and MAMA Gallery, Rotterdam, Netherlands
- Headlands, San Francisco, USA
- Vivid Gallery, Birmingham, UK
- Spaces Gallery, Cleveland, USA
- Futura Gallery, Třebešice Castle, Czech Republic

== Selected works ==
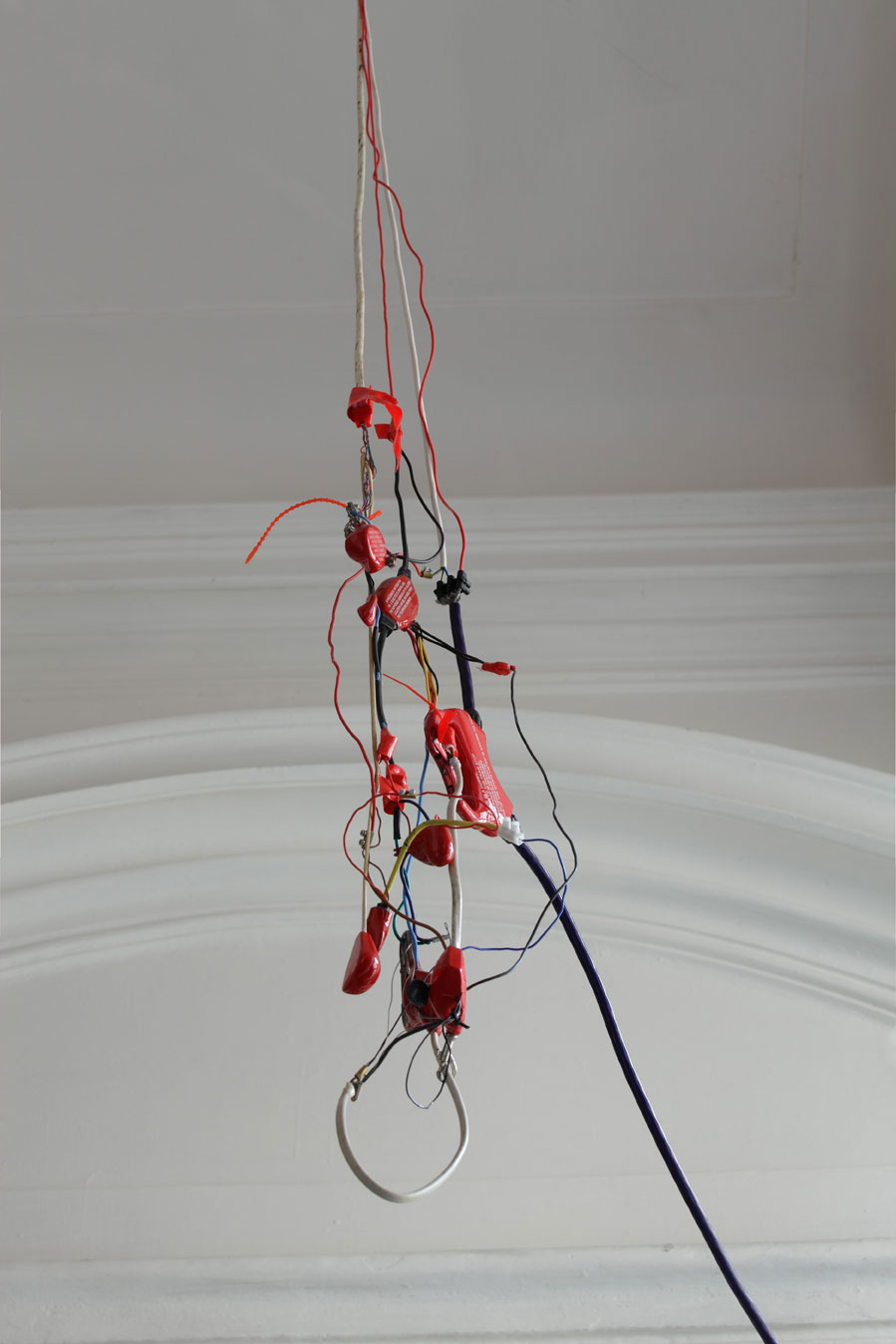
Binds 2006, unspecified dimension, Combined technique

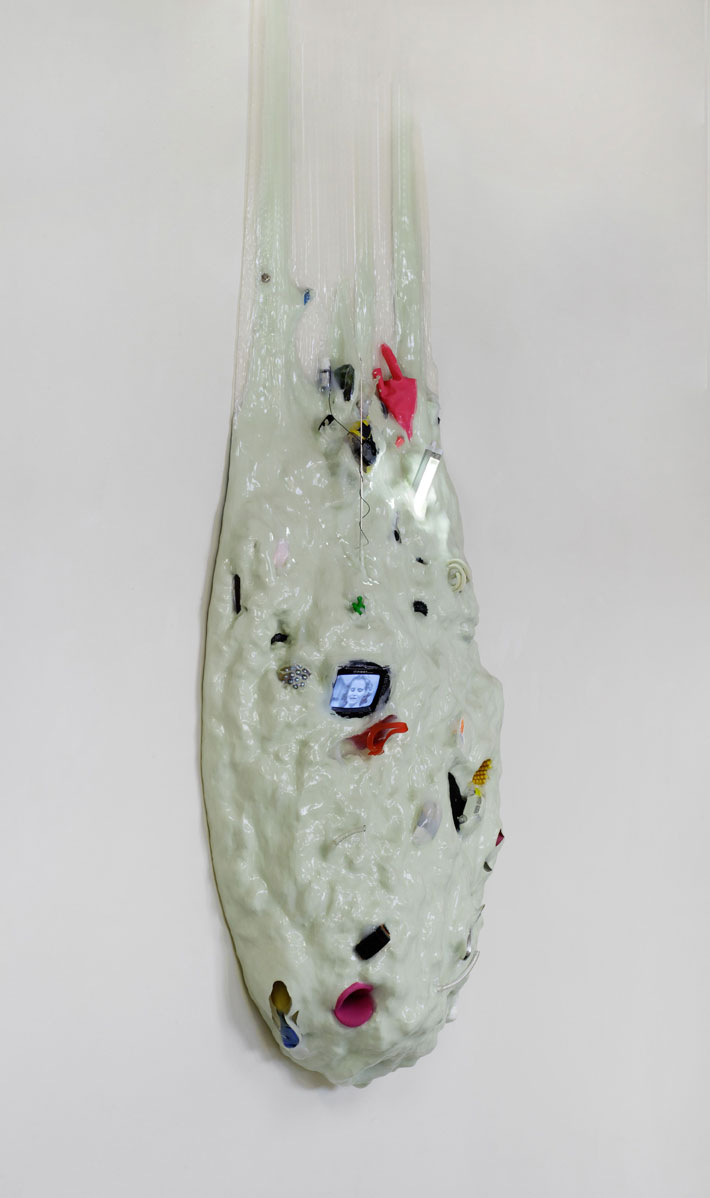
The Gop, 2006, 250x100x50 cm, Combined technique

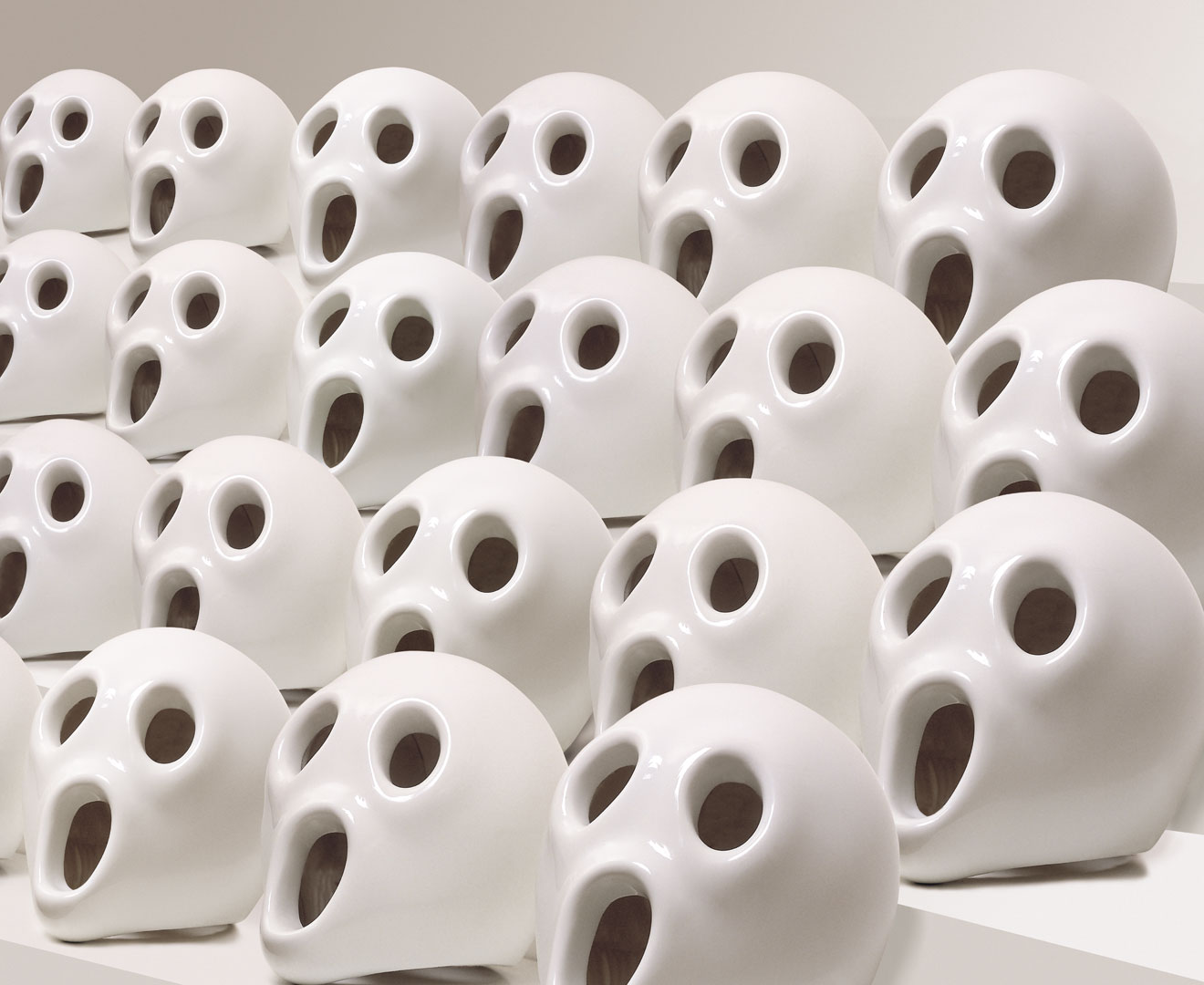
First Schisophrenia produced in series, 1998, 23x23x23 cm, compozite, acryl, fabric

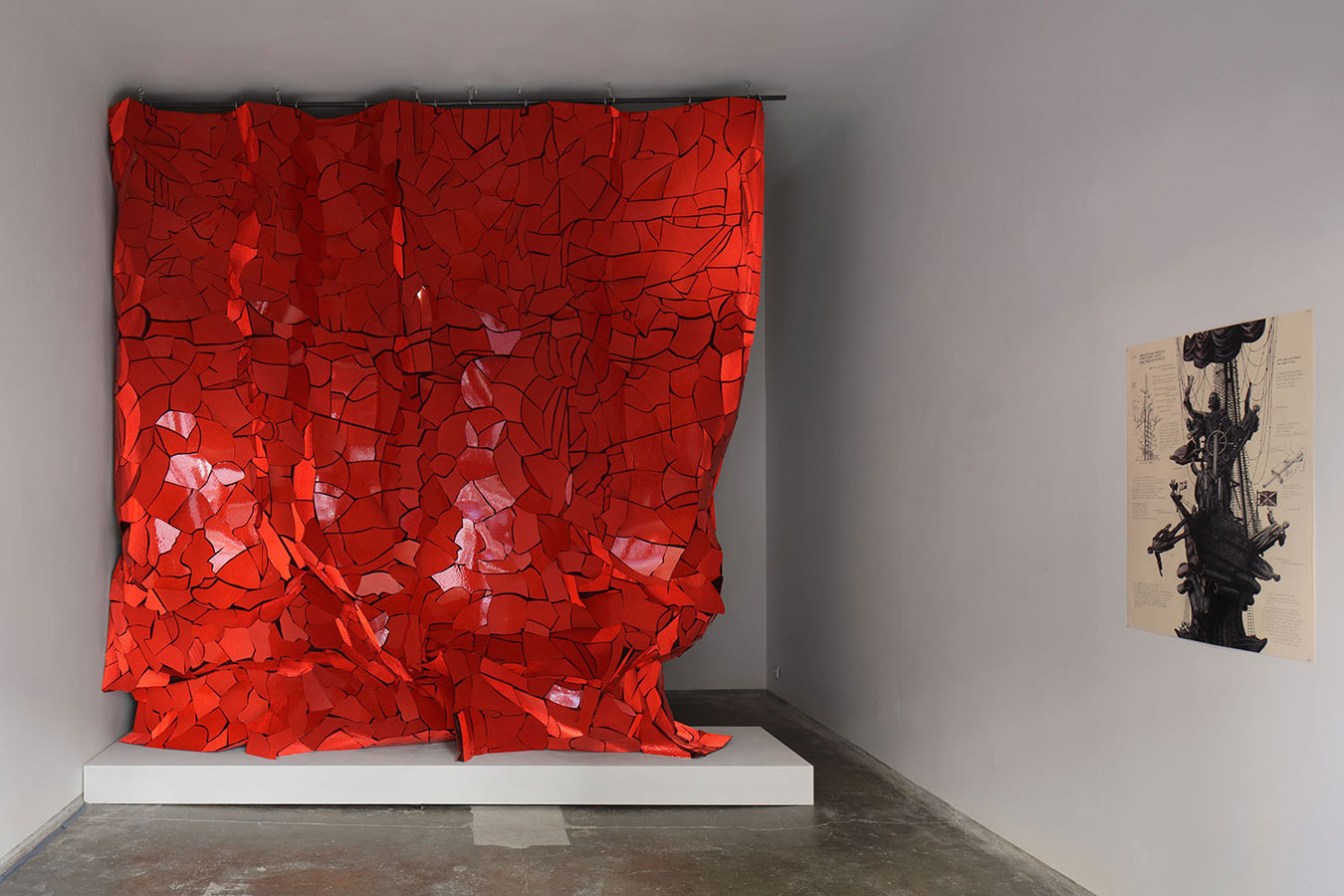
Curtain, 2014, 400x400 cm, fabric, reflective glass

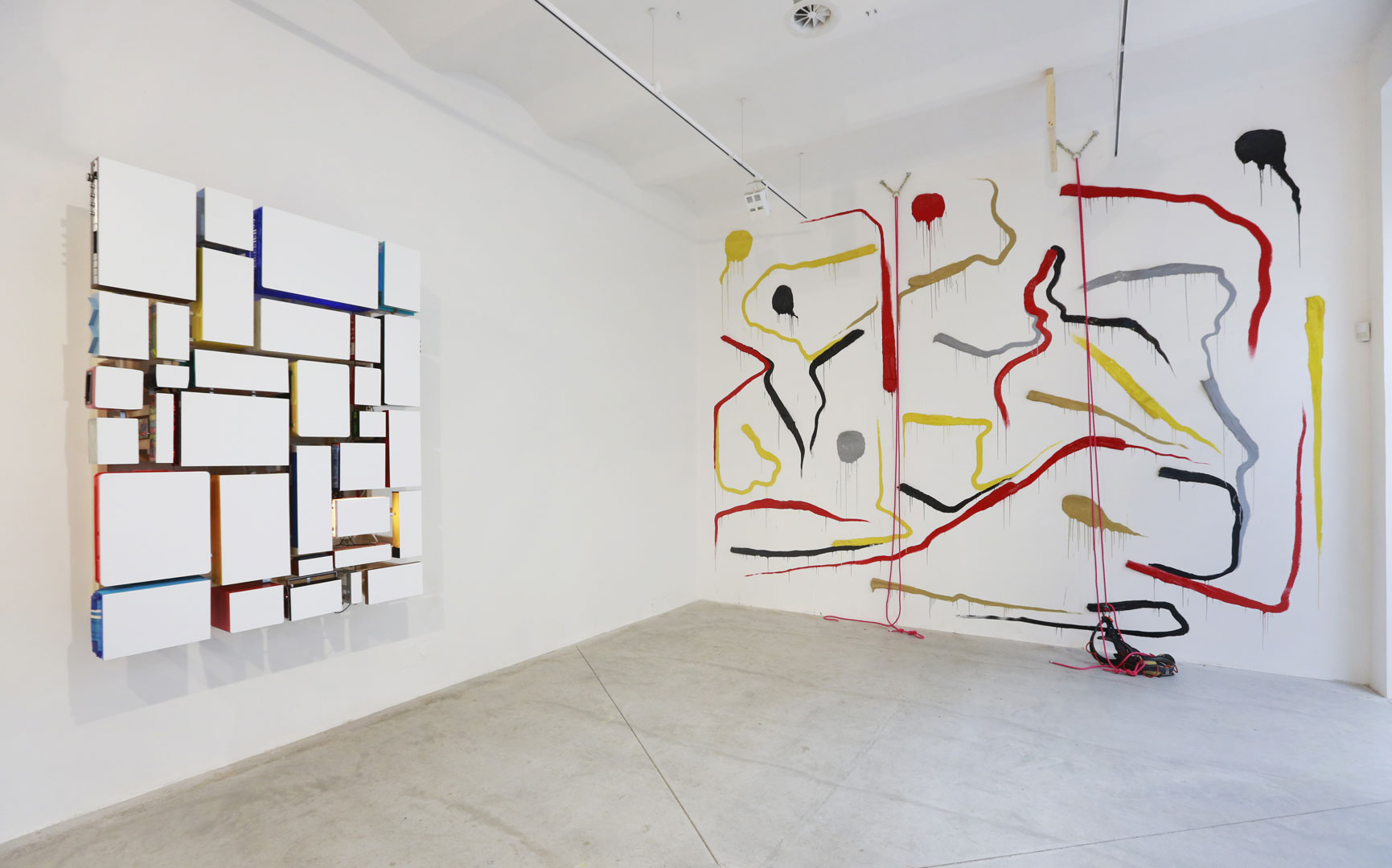
Minimax 2, 2012, 204x147x47 cm, combined technique

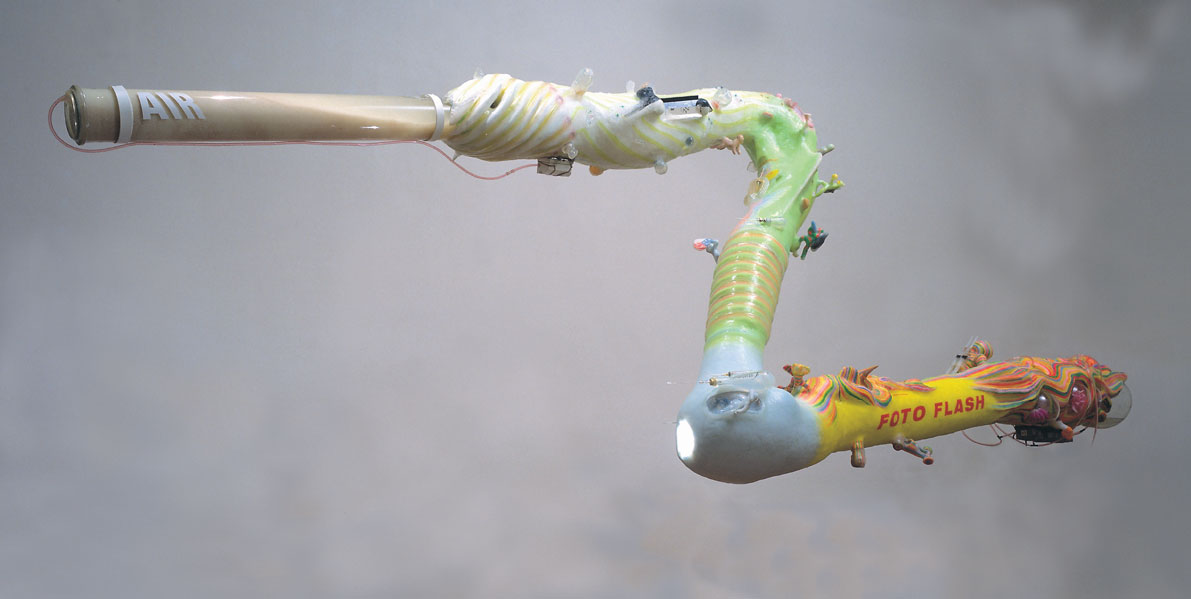
Photoflash (paparazzi sculpture) – 1998, 500x200x120 cm, polyuretan, silicon, glass, precesual tools, water, cleaners, light
