= Patricia Fernández =

- Born: 1980 (age 45–46); Burgos
- Education: UCLA, CalArts

Patricia Fernández Carcedo (born in 1980) is a Spanish-born Los Angeles-based artist.

== Career ==
Fernández was born in Burgos, Spain, and currently lives and works in Los Angeles, CA. She earned a BFA from the University of California, Los Angeles in 2002 and a MFA from the California Institute for the Arts in 2010. Fernández is a recipient of the Joan Mitchell Foundation Grant.

As part of her practice, Fernandez explores the geography, real and imagined, created and shaped by the people displaced as a result of the repression during General Francisco Franco’s dictatorship in Spain. In 2014, as part of her residency at 18th Street Arts Center in Santa Monica, CA, Fernandez presented her exhibition Points of Departure (Between Spain and France) where she documents and recreates the walks of these displaced Spaniards over the Pyrenees into France.

In 2015, Fernández was an Artist in Residence at the Headlands Center for the Arts, a program that brings together pioneering artists from all disciplines. Her work was also recognized by the Récollets Residency Program in 2016.

== Selected exhibitions ==
The following includes some of the main exhibitions of Fernández's work:

- California-Pacific Triennial. Orange County Museum of Art, California (2017)
- Chapters: Book Arts in Southern California, Craft and Folk Art Museum (2017)
- Ours is a City of Writers, Los Angeles Municipal Gallery, Barnsdall Art Park, Los Angeles (2017)
- Cinco puntos de partida, Centro de Arte Caja de Burgos, Museum, Spain (2015)
- Box (a proposition for ten years), LAM Gallery, Los Angeles (2015)
- Points of Departure: Five Walks, Commonwealth & Council, Los Angeles (2015)
- Between Two Worlds, Cal State Los Angeles Gallery, Los Angeles, CA (2015)
- Points of Departure (between Spain and France), 18th Street Arts Center, Santa Monica, CA (2014)
- Paseo de Los Melancólicos, LA><ART, Los Angeles, CA (2014)
- Box (a proposition for ten years), Commonwealth & Council, Los Angeles, CA (2013)
- The Records, David Petersen Gallery, Minneapolis, MN (2013)
- A Record of Succession, ltd Los Angeles, Los Angeles (2012)
- Made in LA, Biennial, Hammer Museum, Los Angeles (2012)
- Marc di Suvero's Peace Tower, Pacific Standard Time, Los Angeles (2012)
