= Museum of the African Diaspora =

Art museum in San Francisco, California

Coordinates: 37.786411°N 122.401546°W

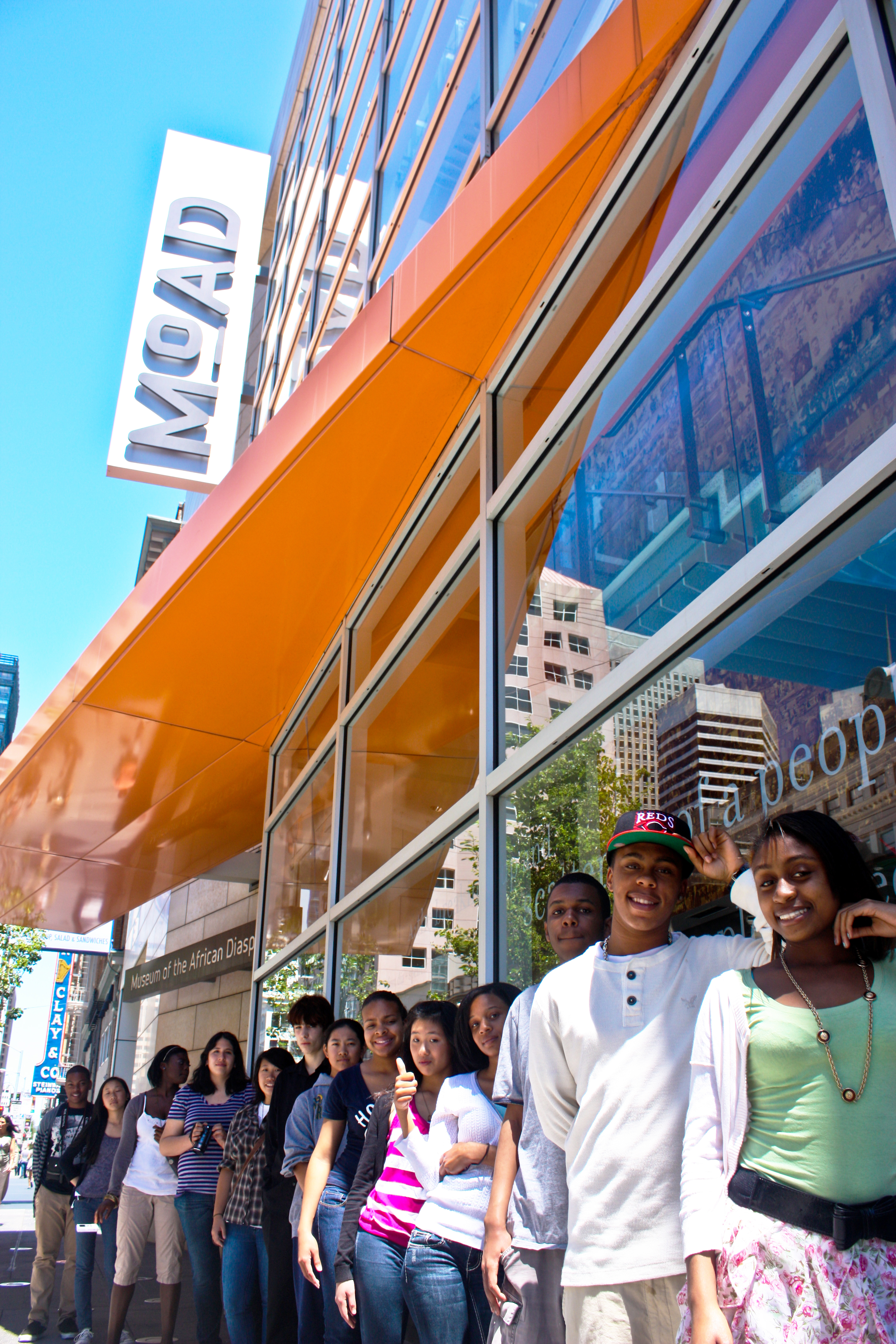
Museum of the African Diaspora members stand outside the museum, awaiting a tour.

The Museum of the African Diaspora (MoAD) is a contemporary art museum in San Francisco, California. MoAD holds exhibitions and presents artists exclusively of the African diaspora, one of only a few museums of its kind in the United States. Located at 685 Mission St. and occupying the first three floors of the St. Regis Museum Tower in the Yerba Buena Arts District, MoAD is a nonprofit organization as well as a Smithsonian Affiliate. Prior to 2014, MoAD educated visitors on the history, culture, and art of the African diaspora through permanent and rotating exhibitions. After a six-month refurbishment in 2014 to expand the gallery spaces, the museum reopened and transitioned into presenting exclusively fine arts exhibitions. MoAD does not have a permanent collection and instead works directly with artists or independent curators when developing exhibitions.

== Mission ==
MoAD "celebrates Black cultures, ignites challenging conversations, and inspires learning through the global lens of the African Diaspora."

== History ==
MoAD was developed as part of a public/private partnership led by the San Francisco Redevelopment Agency. In 1999, the City of San Francisco created a mandate to include an African-American cultural presence in the last vacant parcel of Yerba Buena Gardens. San Francisco Mayor Willie L. Brown appointed a steering committee to determine the mission and scope of a cultural facility within the complex.

The African American Cultural Institute grew out of a research and development process that began in 2002. The new museum was renamed the Museum of the African Diaspora to reflect a broadened scope and mission, and incorporated as a 501 (c)(3) nonprofit organization. The space was designed by the Freelon Group within the St. Regis Museum Tower, a 42-story skyscraper that apart from the museum consists of luxury condominiums and a five-star hotel. MoAD opened its doors in 2005.

Linda Harrison was appointed as the executive director of MoAD in November 2013. In June 2014, MoAD underwent a six-month renovation that created more gallery space and refreshed the museum's overall look. By October 2014, MoAD was named an official Smithsonian Affiliate. Harrison left MoAD in 2018 to head the Newark Museum in New Jersey.

Monetta White, who has been involved with MoAD since its inception in 2005, was appointed as executive director in December 2019.

== The Original Museum of the African Diaspora ==
Before 2014, when the MoAD revised its mission to center on contemporary art, the museum introduced visitors to the original African diaspora—the original movement of Homo sapiens (from the earliest human remains found in Africa)—to eventually all inhabited regions. The museum asks visitors "when did you first realize you are African?" The museum espouses the scientifically accepted idea of panethnicity, wherein all humans have a common African origin.

== Emerging Artists Program ==
The Emerging Artists Program at the Museum of the African Diaspora was launched concurrently with the celebration of the institution's 10th anniversary, and receives support from the Institute of Museum and Library services.

- Tim Roseborough and Cheryl Derricotte, 2015–2016;
- Nyame Brown, Helina Metaferia, Lili Bernard, and Angie Keller, 2016–2017.

== Past exhibitions ==
Exhibition	Date
Let Your Motto Be Resistance	April 4, 2009 – June 14, 2009
The Art of Richard Mayhew	October 10, 2009 – March 7, 2010
African Continuum	April 20, 2010 – September 26, 2010
Art/Object: Re-Contextualizing African Art	October 7, 2010 – January 17, 2011
Textual Rhythms: Constructing the Jazz Tradition, Contemporary African American Quilts	January 27, 2011 – April 24, 2011
From Process to Print: Graphic Works by Romare Bearden	May 6, 2011 – July 3, 2011
Soulful Stitching: Patchwork Quilts by African (Siddis) in India	July 15, 2011 – September 25, 2011
Collected: Stories of Acquisition and Reclamation	October 7, 2011 – March 4, 2012
Choose Paint! Choose Abstraction!: Celebrating Bay Area Abstract Artists	March 22, 2012 – September 23, 2012
Tuareg and Anima: Photographs of GRACE by Elisabeth Sunday	October 5, 2012 – January 21, 2013
Desert Jewels: North African Jewelry and Photography from the Xavier Guerrand-Hermès Collection	October 5, 2012 – January 21, 2013
The Kinsey Collection: Shared Treasures of Bernard and Shirley Kinsey, Where Art History Intersect	February 8, 2013 – May 19, 2013
J.D. ‘Okhai Ojeikere: Sartorial Moments and the Nearness of Yesterday	June 20, 2013 – November 24, 2013
Crosscurrents: Africa and Black Diasporas in Dialogue, 1960-1980	December 5, 2013 – April 13, 2014
Drapetomanía: Grupo Antillano and the Art of Afro-Cuba	December 1, 2014 – January 4, 2015
The Art of Elizabeth Catlett	January 16, 2015 – April 5, 2105
Lave Thomas: Beyond	December 3, 2014 – April 5, 2015
Marie Johnson Calloway: Legacy of Color	February 4, 2015 – April 12, 2015
Portraits and Other Likenesses from SFMOMA	May 8, 2015 – October 11, 2015
Four Themes: Emerging Artist: Time Roseborough	November 11, 2015 – January 18, 2016
Ghosts/Ships: Emerging Artists: Cheryl Patrice Derricotte	January 27, 2016 – April 3, 2016
Alison Saar: Bearing	November 11, 2015 – April 3, 2016
Who Among Us...The Art of Kenyatta A.C.Hinkle	November 11, 2015 – April 3, 2016
Finding the I in Diaspora: From the MoAD Archives	November 11, 2015 – April 3, 2016
The Grace Jones Project	April 27, 2016 – September 18, 2016
Dandy Lion: (Re)Articulating Black Masculine Identity	April 27, 2016 – September 18, 2016
Bayview Portraits by Byron Malik	October 16, 2016 – November 3, 2016
Finding the 'I' in Diaspora Bayview Popup: From the MoAD archives	July 15, 2016 – November 3, 2016
MoAD Emerging Artists Presents Nyame Brown: Classroom in Nevérÿon	October 26, 2016 – January 16, 2017
MoAD Emerging Artists Presents Helina Metafaria: Home Free	January 25, 2017 – April 2, 2017
Urban Africa	October 26, 2016 – April 2, 2017
Where is Here	October 26, 2016 – April 2, 2017
A Matter of Fact: Toyin Ojih Odutola	October 26, 2016 – April 2, 2017
MoAD Emerging Artists presents Lili Bernard: Antebellum Appropriations	April 26, 2017 – June 25, 2017
MoAD Emerging Artists presents Angie Keller: The Gladioli of El Carmen	July 5, 2017 – August 27, 2017
Todd Gray: My life in the Bush with MJ and Iggy	April 26, 2017 – August 27, 2017
The Ease of Fiction	April 26, 2017 – August 27, 2017
Love or Confusion: Jimi Hendrix in 1967	April 26, 2017 – August 27, 2017
MoAD Emerging Artists presents Ebitenyefa Baralaye: Many Rooms	September 20, 2017 – November 26, 2017
MoAD Emerging Artists presents Simone Bailey: Let There Be Darkness	December 6, 2017 – March 4, 2018
Otra Mas': 40 Years of Carnaval in San Francsico	September 20, 2017 – March 4, 2018
En Mas': Carnival and Performance Art of the Caribbean	September 20, 2017 – March 4, 2018
MoAD Emerging Artists presents Andrew Wilson: Equivalencies: Abandoned Bodies	March 28, 2018 – June 3, 2018
MoAD Emerging Artists presents summer mason: Gemini	June 20, 2018 – August 26, 2018
Digitalia: Art & the Economy of Ideas	March 28, 2018 – August 26, 2018
After the Thrill is Gone: Fashion, Politics and Culture in Contemporary South African Art	March 28, 2018 – August 26, 2018
MoAD Emerging Artists presents Indira Allegra: B O D Y W A R P	September 19, 2018 – November 4, 2018
MoAD Emerging Artists presents 5/5 Collective: black now(here)	November 11, 2018 – December 15, 2018
I TOLD YOU WHO AM I: Shushan Tesfuzigta	September 19, 2018 – December 16, 2018
Second Look, Twice: Selections from the Collections of Jordan D. Schnitzer and His Family Foundation	September 19, 2018 – December 16, 2018
Ficre Ghebreyesus: City with a River Running Through	September 19, 2018 – December 16, 2018
Sadie Barnette: Phone Home	January 16, 2019 – April 14, 2019
Black Refractions: Highlight from the Studio Museum in Harlem	January 16, 2019 – April 14, 2019
Rodney Ewing: Longitude + Latitude	May 8, 2019 – June 23, 2019
Sydney Cain: Refutations	October 20, 2021 - December 19, 2021
Billie Zangewa: Thread for a Web Begun	October 20, 2021 - February 27, 2022
Amoako Boafo: Soul of Black Folks	October 20, 2021 - February 27, 2022
Beyond the Sky Film exhibition	October 20, 2021 - February 27, 2022
Cynthia Aurora Brannvall: The Threads That Bind	March 31, 2022 - June 12, 2022
Elegies - Still Lifes in Contemporary Art	March 31, 2022 - August 21, 2022
Richard-Jonathan Nelson: Interlacing distributed intelligence/ noir care	June 22, 2022 - September 18, 2022
Sam Vernon: Impasse of Desires	March 31, 2022 - September 18, 2022
David Huffman: Terra Incognita	March 31, 2022 - September 18, 2022
Trina Michelle Robinson: Excavation: Past, Present and Future	October 5, 2022 - December 11, 2022

== See also ==
- List of museums focused on African Americans
