= Jindřich Chalupecký Award =

- Native name: Cena Jindřicha Chalupeckého
- Description: Annual prize honoring outstanding emerging visual artists active on the Czech art scene
- Country: Czech Republic
- Presented by: Jindřich Chalupecký Society

The Jindřich Chalupecký Award (Czech: Cena Jindřicha Chalupeckého) is a prize awarded annually to young visual artists. Candidates must be Czech citizens under the age of 35.

== History ==
The prize was established in 1990 by Václav Havel, Jiří Kolář and Theodor Pištěk. Until 2000, it was awarded in cooperation with the National Gallery in Prague, but following a dispute between Milan Knížák and David Černý the administration was moved to Brno (Dům umění města Brna and Dům pánů z Kunštátu).

== Background ==
The prize is awarded by an independent jury, and is managed by the civic association Jindřich Chalupecký Society (Czech: Společnost Jindřicha Chalupeckého). It is named after the art critic and art historian Jindřich Chalupecký.

The winner receives CZK 50,000 together with a further CZK 100,000 for an exhibition, project or catalogue, and a six-week scholarship in New York.

The awards are announced in the magazine Reflex, and an award based on the voting on the website of the magazine carries CZK 30,000 and an auction of works by the finalists.

== Laureates ==
Source: Jindřich Chalupecký Society

- 1990 – Vladimír Kokolia
- 1991 – František Skála
- 1992 – Michal Nesázal
- 1993 – Martin Mainer
- 1994 – Michal Gabriel
- 1995 – Petr Nikl
- 1996 – Kateřina Vincourová
- 1997 – Jiří Příhoda
- 1998 – Jiří Černický
- 1999 – Lukáš Rittstein
- 2000 – David Černý
- 2001 – Tomáš Vaněk
- 2002 – Markéta Othová
- 2003 – Michal Pěchouček
- 2004 – Ján Mančuška
- 2005 – Kateřina Šedá
- 2006 – Barbora Klímová
- 2007 – Eva Koťátková
- 2008 – Radim Labuda
- 2009 – Jiří Skála
- 2010 – Vasil Artamonov and Alexey Klyuykov
- 2011 – Mark Ther
- 2012 – Vladimír Houdek
- 2013 - Dominik Lang
- 2014 - Roman Štětina
- 2015 - Barbora Kleinhamplová
- 2016 - Matyáš Chochola

== See also ==
- List of European art awards
