= Stephanie Anne Johnson =

American artist

- Born: 1952 (age 73–74); Harrisburg, Pennsylvania, USA
- Education: Emerson College, San Francisco State University, The University of California, Berkeley, Union Institute & University
- Known for: Theatre, Installation, Performance
- Awards: National Endowment for the Arts 1982

Stephanie Anne Johnson (born 1952) is an American mixed media artist. Many of her works are site-specific, open-air art installation pieces.

== Early life and education ==
Stephanie Anne Johnson was born in Harrisburg, Pennsylvania, in 1952. Her mother, Virginia E. Johnson, was a teacher and social worker who also worked with the American Negro Theater in Harlem, and her father, Dr. Lawrence J. Johnson was a child psychologist in the Bronx.

Johnson attended Emerson College, completing her B.F.A in theatre in 1974. At Emerson she took a class in lighting design. After college, her first jobs were doing lighting design. This led to a 40-year career as a theatrical lighting designer and eventually inspired her work in the visual arts. In the early 1990s she decided to pursue higher education in the Fine Arts and in 1994 she received her M.A. from San Francisco State University. In 1999 she received her M.F.A. from the University of California, Berkeley. Her Doctorate with an emphasis on public policy was conferred by Union Institute & University in 2013. Johnson also performs a solo piece entitled “Every Twenty One Days: Cancer, Yoga, and Me.”

A founding faculty member in 1995, Johnson is currently a Professor in the Visual and Public Art Department at California State University, Monterey Bay.

== Work ==
Johnson has principally built her art reputation around public art installations and performance art. Her art frequently focuses on themes about ancestral legacies, historical and cultural dynamics, including enslaved Africans, immigration, gender discrimination and cross racial issues.

Her sculptural installations often employ light to create symbolic images, reveal metaphors, and evoke emotion, putting the skills she acquired as a professional lighting designer to use in her practice as an art maker. Johnson has had two one person art shows in San Francisco. Her work has been shown locally and nationally, most notably in the “Bearing Witness” exhibition at Spelman College in Atlanta, Georgia.

== Awards, fellowships and residencies ==
In 1982 Johnson was National Endowment for the Arts grant recipient. In 1995 she completed an 11-month studio residency at the Headlands Center for the Arts. Johnson has been awarded Lighting Artists in Dance grants. She has been nominated for Excellence in Lighting Design by Theatre Bay Area, San Francisco Bay Area Critic’s Circle, and Broadway Theatre West.
