= Headlands Center for the Arts =

Artist-in-residence program in California

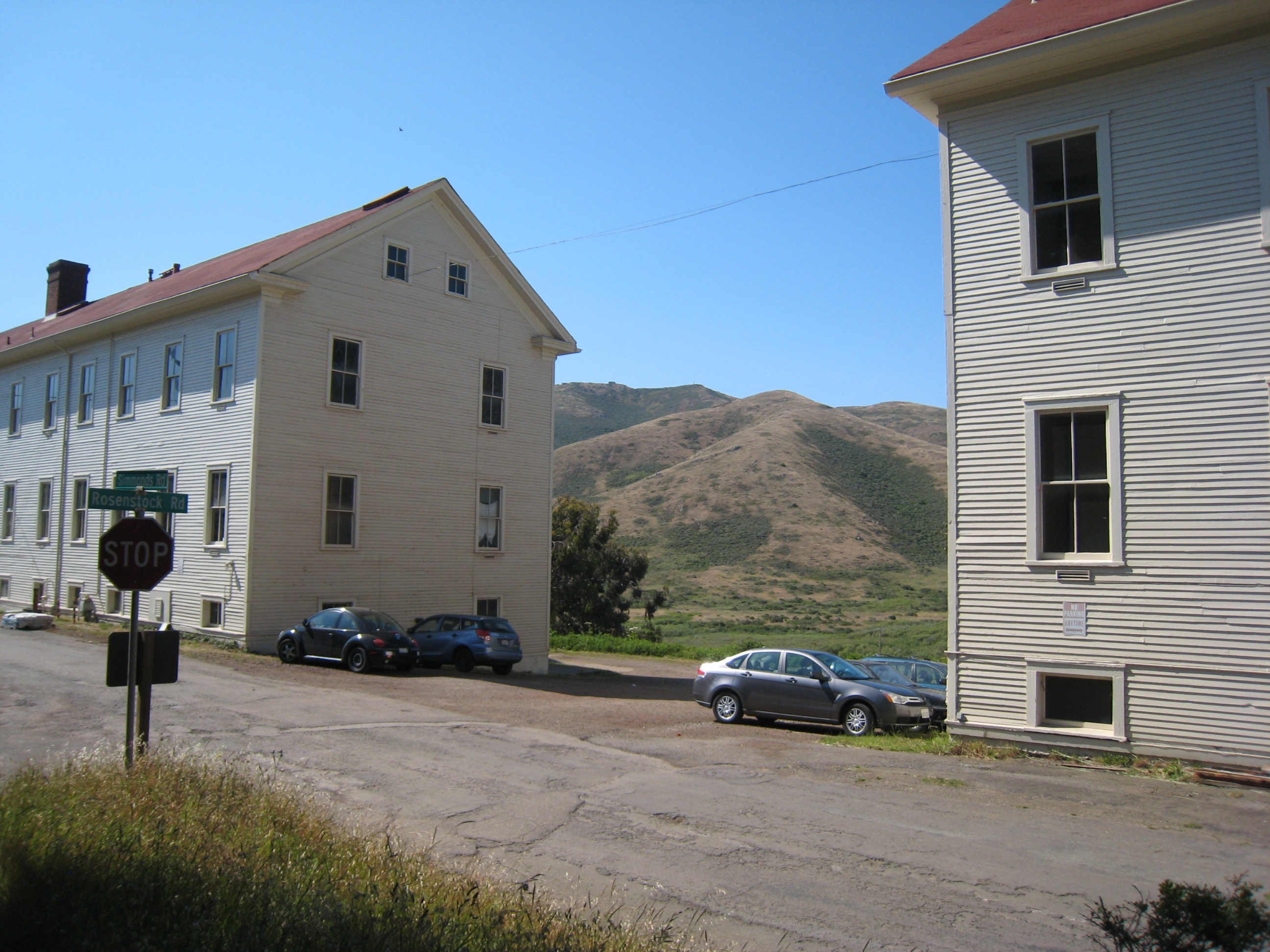
Headlands Center for the Arts

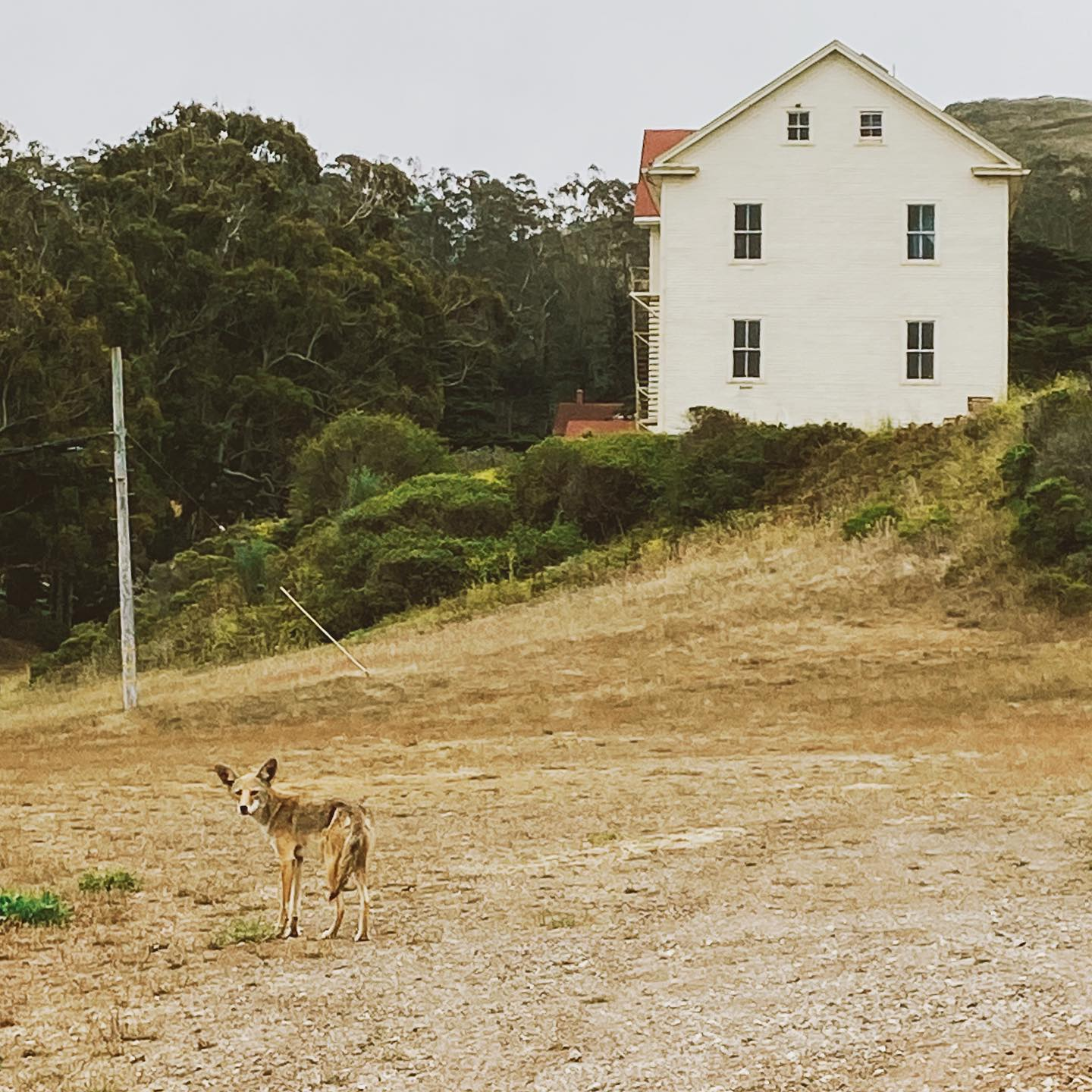
Coyote at Headlands, 2021

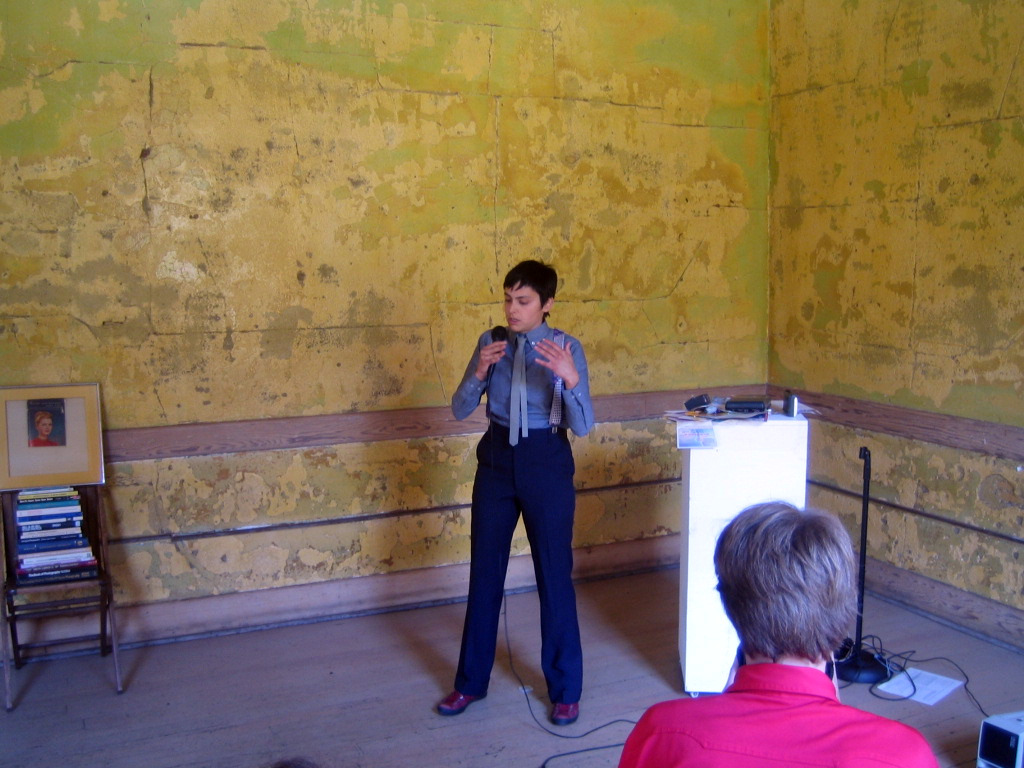
Ariel Goldberg at Headlands, 2010

Headlands Center for the Arts hosts an internationally recognized artist-in-residence program, and interdisciplinary public programs. It is situated in a campus of artist-renovated military buildings in the Marin Headlands, in Marin County, California, United States.

== Mission and history ==
Headlands Center for the Arts provides an environment for creative process and the development of new work and ideas. Through artists’ residencies and public programs, Headlands offers opportunities for artist research, dialogue and exchange that build understanding and appreciation for the role of art in society.

Headlands Center for the Arts was conceived through a planning process conducted by the Golden Gate National Recreation Area after the transfer of former military property to the National Park Service. The Park Service engaged a number of nonprofit organizations as "Park Partners", to assist them in restoring the historic buildings and developing interpretive programs for the public. Headlands was incorporated in 1982 by a founding board of directors consisting primarily of local artists. In 1994 Headlands secured a long-term cooperative agreement for use of the buildings within the Golden Gate National Recreation Area. In 2021, the nonprofit arts organization hired the first Latina, Maricelle Robles, to serve as its executive director.

== Headlands campus ==
Originally inhabited by Coast Miwok, the area was used for military installations including Fort Barry for more than a century, before the United States Army withdrew in 1972 and turned over the land to the National Park Service. Headlands is housed in a cluster of nine historic, 1907-era military buildings at Fort Barry. Residency studios, offices and public rooms are located in two four-story former army barracks.

Since 1985, Headlands has renovated these historic structures through granting commissions to artists. Major American artists, including Ann Hamilton, David Ireland, Bruce Tomb, and John Randolph, have designed and supervised the renovation of the public rooms in the main building.

In 1998, artist Leonard Hunter and architect Mark Cavagnero led the award-winning rehabilitation of a nearby 1907 Army storage depot, which now houses the Affiliate Artist program studios.

== Artists-in-residence program ==
The Artist in Residence (AIR) Program has earned international renown for bringing together pioneering artists in all disciplines — visual, literary, performing and new media — from throughout the U.S. and abroad. The AIR program provides a supportive working environment that allows time for artists to experiment, reflect and grow, both individually and collectively, during their stay. The program offers fully sponsored live-in and live-out residencies to approximately 30 artists each year, from March to November, and is distinguished in that there is no fee to participate. Residencies range from one to six months, with an average live-in stay of three months.

The focus is on the artist’s process of investigation and creation rather than on the presentation of work. AIRs join a community of up to 70 artists a year (including Affiliate Artists, MFA Award, and Tournesol Award winners), with an average of forty on site at any time.

=== Artist studio facilities ===
The Fort Barry campus is home to nearly 40 studios, shared residences, and spaces for offices, performances and events. Residency studios, offices, and public rooms are located in two four-story former army barracks with 13-foot ceilings, large windows, period detail, and hardwood floors.

=== Housing and other benefits ===
Live-in residents share historic military officers’ houses.

== Alumni ==
Alumni artists have been honored with MacArthur Fellowships, Guggenheim Fellowships, The Rome Prize and inclusion at the Whitney Biennial and the Venice Biennale, among many other awards. Notable alumni include:

- Sanford Biggers
- Tania Bruguera
- Thomas Campbell
- Remy Charlip
- Tony Cragg
- Paul DeMarinis
- Mark Dion
- Rodney Ewing
- Patricia Fernández
- Harrell Fletcher
- The Foundry
- Anya Gallaccio
- Guillermo Gómez-Peña
- Sam Green
- Joe Goode
- Ann Hamilton
- Barbara Hammer
- Mildred Howard
- Brenda Hutchinson
- Lewis Hyde
- Stephanie Anne Johnson
- Margaret Kilgallen
- Ned Kahn
- Nikki S. Lee
- Julie Mehretu
- Miya Masaoka
- Barry McGee
- Toyin Ojih Odutola
- Simon J. Ortiz
- Ricardo Richey
- Shahzia Sikander
- Bill Shannon
- Rebecca Solnit
- Thomas Scheibitz
- Tiffany Shlain
- František Skála
- Zak Smith
- Stephanie Syjuco
- Kirmen Uribe
- Andrew Norman Wilson
- Andrea Zittel
- Minoosh Zomorodinia
- Samson Kambalu
