= Apexer =

San Francisco-based public artist and mural painter

The Apexer (also known as Ricardo Richey) is a San Francisco-based public artist and mural painter. His works have appeared throughout US and internationally. He has done commissioned mural projects for museums including the deYoung Museum and San Francisco Museum of Modern Art.

== Biography ==
Apexer was born in San Francisco, California, in 1978. He is a third-generation San Franciscan. He is Latino and African-American.

Apexer studied classical art techniques, architecture, graphic design, and art history while developing his own artistic identity. Apexer credits the San Francisco-based community organization Precita Eyes with guiding him to find his own artistic voice. “If I’m painting from my imagination, I’m representing everybody,” said APEX. “I’m not representing one person. Or one race.”

== Public works ==
- Stanford University
- Zoox Building, San Francisco, 2024
- Stadia Bar, Caesars Palace, Las Vegas, 2021
- Hayes Valley Playground, 2019
- Apexer, The Path of Intuition, Juxtapoz Art and Culture Magazine, 2018
- Haight Street Summer of Love in collaboration with de Young Museum, 2017
- Timbuk2 Flagship Store Front in Brooklyn, 2017
- Space NK First Boutique in San Francisco, 2016
- St Peter's Art Alliance, Florida, 2016
