= Cheryl Derricotte =

American visual artist

Cheryl Patrice Derricotte
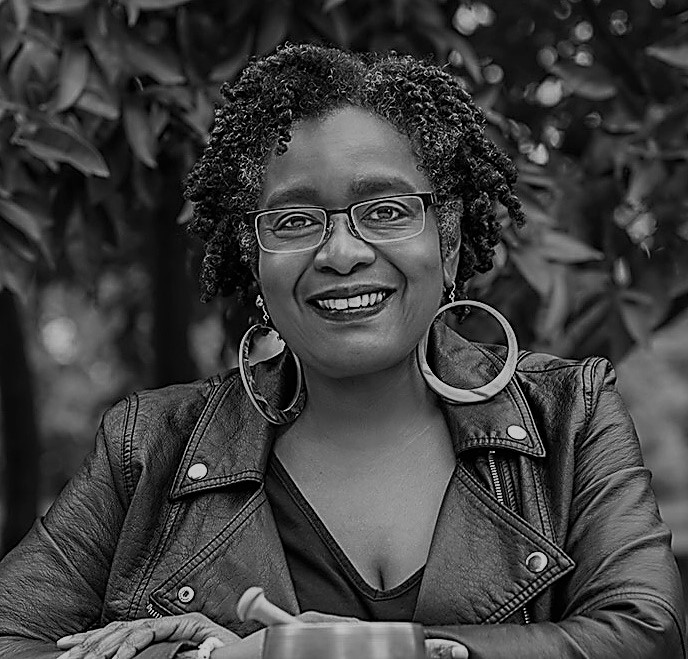
- Born: Washington, D.C., U.S.
- Citizenship: American
- Education: M.F.A., California Institute of Integral Studies M.R.P., Cornell University
- Known for: Glass art

Cheryl Patrice Derricotte is an American visual artist working mostly with glass and paper. She lives and works in San Francisco, California.

== Early life and education ==
Derricotte is originally from Washington, DC.

She holds a Master of Fine Arts from the California Institute of Integral Studies (CIIS), a Master of Regional Planning from Cornell University, and a B.A. in Urban Affairs from Barnard College, Columbia University.

== Artwork ==
Derricotte describes her artwork process as:

Identities shaped by home (or homelessness); natural beauty (or disasters), memories of happiness (or loss) inspire my artwork. This results in works on glass and paper. Both materials are translucent and seemingly fragile, yet they are hearty enough to survive the passage of time between civilizations. I make art from research. This type of inquiry also leads me not just to economic but also environmental concerns. Observations of current events, politics, and urban landscapes are my entry into these issues.

She has exhibited in galleries, museums and art spaces. Her first solo exhibition in 2016, Ghosts/Ships, held at the Museum of the African Diaspora in San Francisco, "offers a glimpse into the global African slave trade that is both subtle and direct in its links between past and present." In 2019 she was part of the “Ancestral Journeys” exhibition at the Euphrat Museum of Art, an exhibition which "spotlights self-identity, family history, immigration, and diasporas..."

== Awards ==
Her awards include a San Francisco Individual Artist Commission; Hemera Foundation Tending Space Fellowship for Artists; the Rick and Val Beck Scholarship for Glass; Emerging Artist at the Museum of the African Diaspora; Gardarev Center Fellow; Art Alliance for Contemporary Glass’ Visionary Scholarship, D.C. Commission on the Arts & Humanities/ National Endowment for the Arts Artist Fellowship Grant, San Francisco Individual Artist Commission, and a Puffin Foundation Grant. She was a Finalist for the LEAP Award in 2016.

== Arts activist ==
Derricotte was the Secretary/Minister of Information for Three Point Nine Art Collective, a group of San Francisco area Black artists. She also served as the Chief Mindfulness Officer of Crux, a U.S. nationwide cooperative of Black artists "working at the intersection of art and technology through immersive storytelling (Virtual Reality)." She has also been part of moderated discussions and talks "responding to representations of race and identity."
