= Dominik Lang =

Czech artist

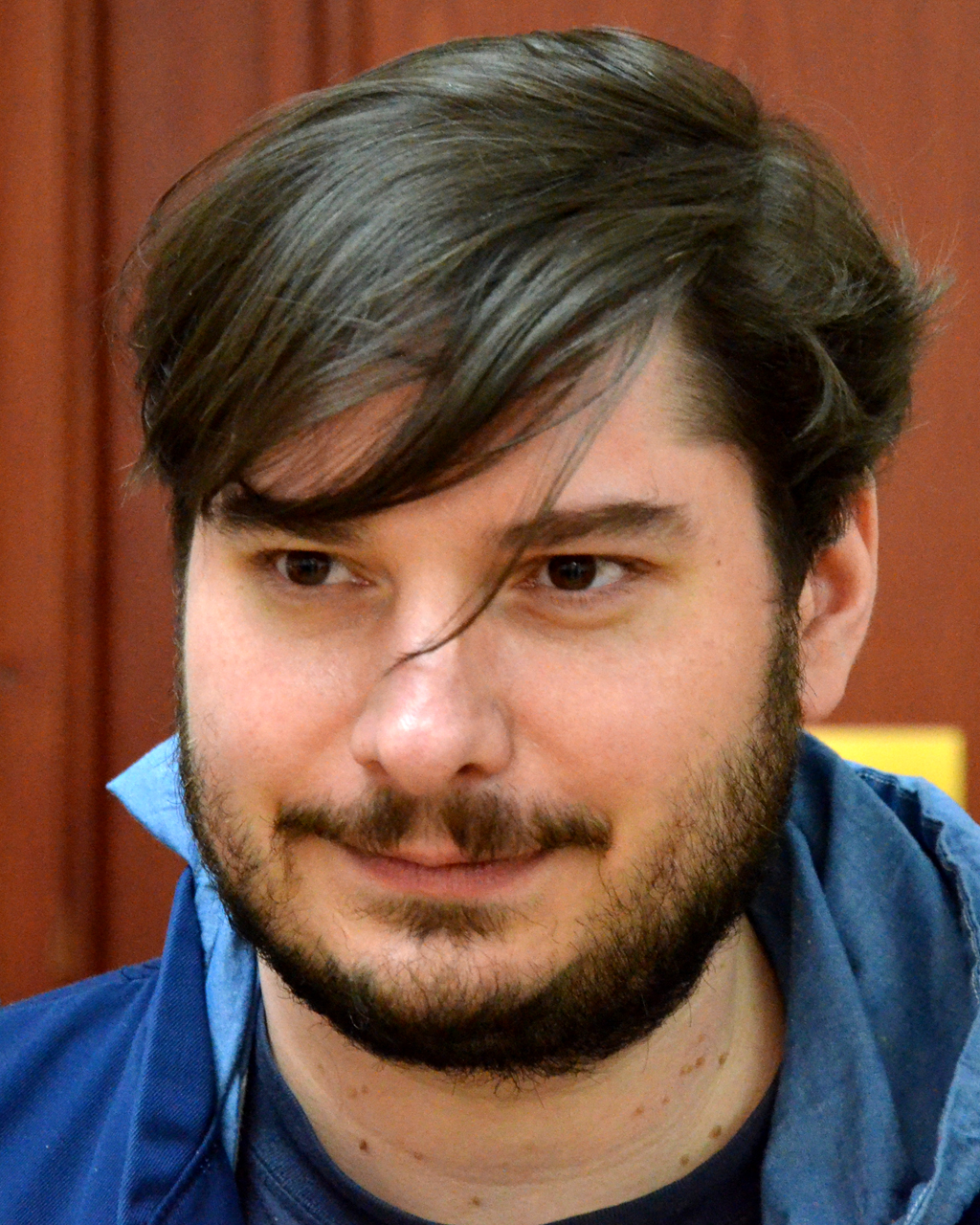
Lang in 2016

Dominik Lang (born 1980, Prague) is a Czech artist. Lang is best known for his installation Sleeping City in the Czech Pavilion at the 2011 Venice Biennale. He has also received attention for his works Memories of the Future and Girl with Pigeon. His work has been exhibited at Inhotim outside Belo Horizonte in Brazil. He is part of a new vanguard of Czech artists that have been exhibited internationally since the end of the Cold War.
