= Martin Mainer =

Czech artist and professor (born 1959)

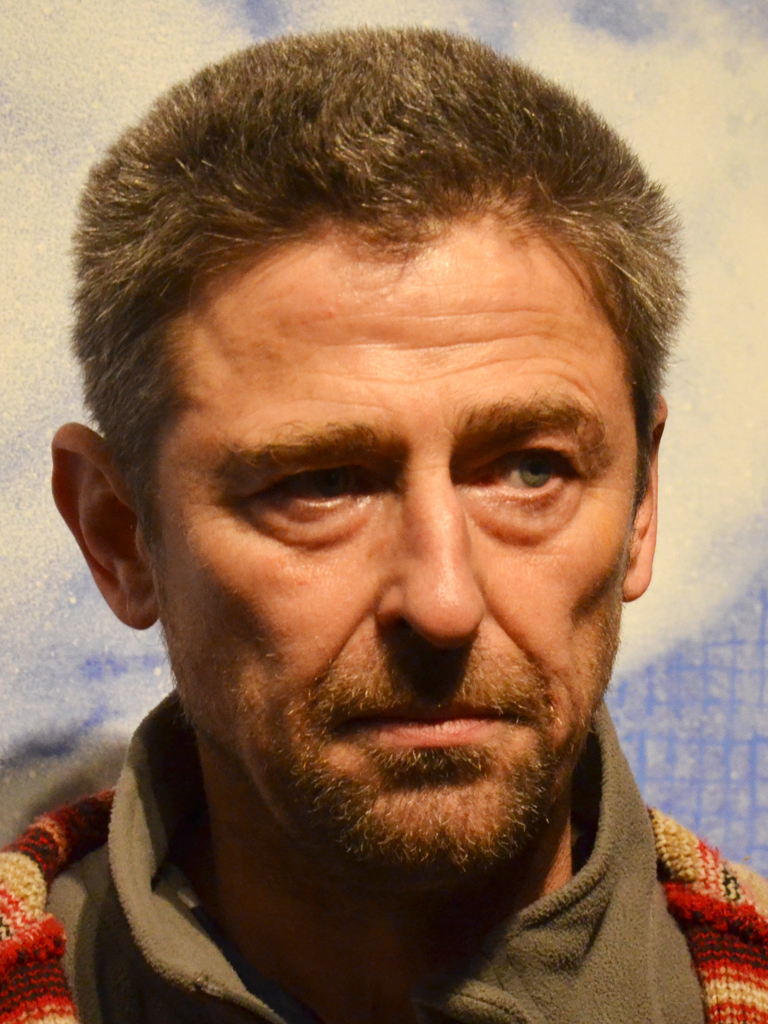
Martin Mainer

Martin Mainer (born 31 October 1959) is a Czech artist and professor.

== Career ==
Mainer was born on 31 October 1959 in Havířov, Czechoslovakia. He studied at the Academy of Arts, Architecture and Design in Prague in 1978–1981 and the Academy of Fine Arts, Prague, in 1981–1985 (Prof. A. Padrlík). In 1993 he received the Jindřich Chalupecký Award (the most prestigious Czech art prize). He worked in the Headlands Center for the Arts in California. Mainer participated in the IBCA 2005 in the National Gallery in Prague.

Since 1998 he has taught art at the Brno University of Technology, becoming a Professor, the highest Czech academic title, in 2005. His students include Alfred Symůnek, Jan Karpíšek, and Jan Sytař.

His paintings are, for example, in Amsterdam's Stedelijk Museum and have been exhibited among other venues at the National Gallery Prague, where he has also been an exhibition curator.

== Personal ==
Mainer has two daughters, Marie and Karolína.
