= Rodney Ewing (artist) =

San Francisco visual artist (born 1964)

- Born: 1964 (age 61–62); Baton Rouge, Louisiana, U.S.
- Education: Louisiana State University, West Virginia University
- Occupation: Visual artist
- Website: https://www.rodneyewing.com/

Rodney Ewing (born 1964) is an African-American interdisciplinary visual artist. He lives in New York City as of 2022, and formerly lived in San Francisco, California.

== Early life and education ==
Rodney Ewing was born in 1964 in Baton Rouge, Louisiana. His father was a Vietnam veteran, who also served 20 years in the United States Air Force. Rodney Ewing also served in the military and is a Desert Storm veteran. Ewing’s father introduced him to art through comic books. Ewing also said he went to schools that had strong art programs.

Ewing received his Bachelor of Fine Art: Printmaking, Louisiana State University, Baton Rouge, Louisiana in 1989; and his Master of Fine Arts: Printmaking, West Virginia University, Morgantown, West Virginia in 1992.

== Work ==
Ewing's work explores identity, narrative, history, space, displacement, physical vulnerability and violence. Ewing's work involves extensive subject research. Often Ewing uses once-common, but now little-known historical objects. He also uses first person narratives. Ewing's art explores and translates the literal and emotional dimensions of these subjects. Along with historical images of artifacts and victims of violence, Ewing often layers in quotations by different writers. Reading these quotations, sometimes obscured by the visual elements of the piece, creates another experience that is unique and nuanced within the context of the print, sculpture or installation. He employs different methods to draw the viewer in, literally and figuratively, toward the piece and immerses the viewer in a reorienting experience of images, words and ideas.

Ewing's work has referenced James Baldwin, Henry Box Brown, Colson Whitehead, George Stinney, Charles Moore, San Francisco Redevelopment after Japanese Internment, Ralph Ellison, Petrus Camper, and Saul Williams. His artwork is in public museum collections, including at Harvard Art Museums, Fairfield University Art Museum, and the Philadelphia Museum of Art.

== Reviews ==
“Rodney Ewing’s drawings, installations, and mixed media works focus on his need to intersect body and place, memory and fact to re-examine human histories, cultural conditions, and events. With his work he is pursuing a narrative that requires us to be present and intimate.”

...much of [Ewing's] work is about empowering the audience and giving them opportunities to recognize their own agency

== Residencies and select exhibitions ==
- My Country Needs Me National Gallery of Art, Washington DC.
- 2020, Close to Home, Creativity in Crisis, San Francisco Museum of Modern Art, San Francisco, California
- 2020, The Space Program, San Francisco, California
- 2019, Project Space: Headlands Center for the Arts, Marin County, California
- 2019, Museum of the African Diaspora, Smithsonian Museum Affiliate, San Francisco, California
- 2019, artist residency at Bemis Center for Contemporary Arts, Omaha, Nebraska
- 2018, Artifacts: On War & Survival at the National Veterans Art Museum, Chicago, Illinois
- 2018, Djerassi Artists Residency, Woodside, California
- 2018, Sanctuary City: For Liberty and Justice for Some? San Francisco Arts Commission Gallery, San Francisco, California
- 2017–2018, artist residency, Recology, San Francisco, California
- 2017, Hangar Lisbon, Lisbon, Portugal
- 2015, artist-in-residency at de Young Museum, San Francisco, California
- 2015–2016, San Francisco Arts Commission award recipient
- One Less Too Many, PASS7, Lisbon, Portugal
- Reconstruct, Long Island University, Brooklyn, Brooklyn, NY
- Beyond Printmaking 5, Texas Tech University, Lubbock, TX
- Never Alone: Exploring the Bonds Between and With Members of the Armed Forces, San Francisco Arts Commission Gallery, San Francisco, California

== Select works ==
- Sum of My Father (2018), sculpture made of wool military blankets, silkscreen, and engraved name plates
- Between Worlds: Portals (2016), installation explores the history of displacement and resilience of African Americans with doors, windows and words
- Longitude and Latitude (2019), explores the geographic and mnemonic landscapes of historical and social events
