= František Skála =

Czech illustrator, painter, sculptor, and artist (born 1956)

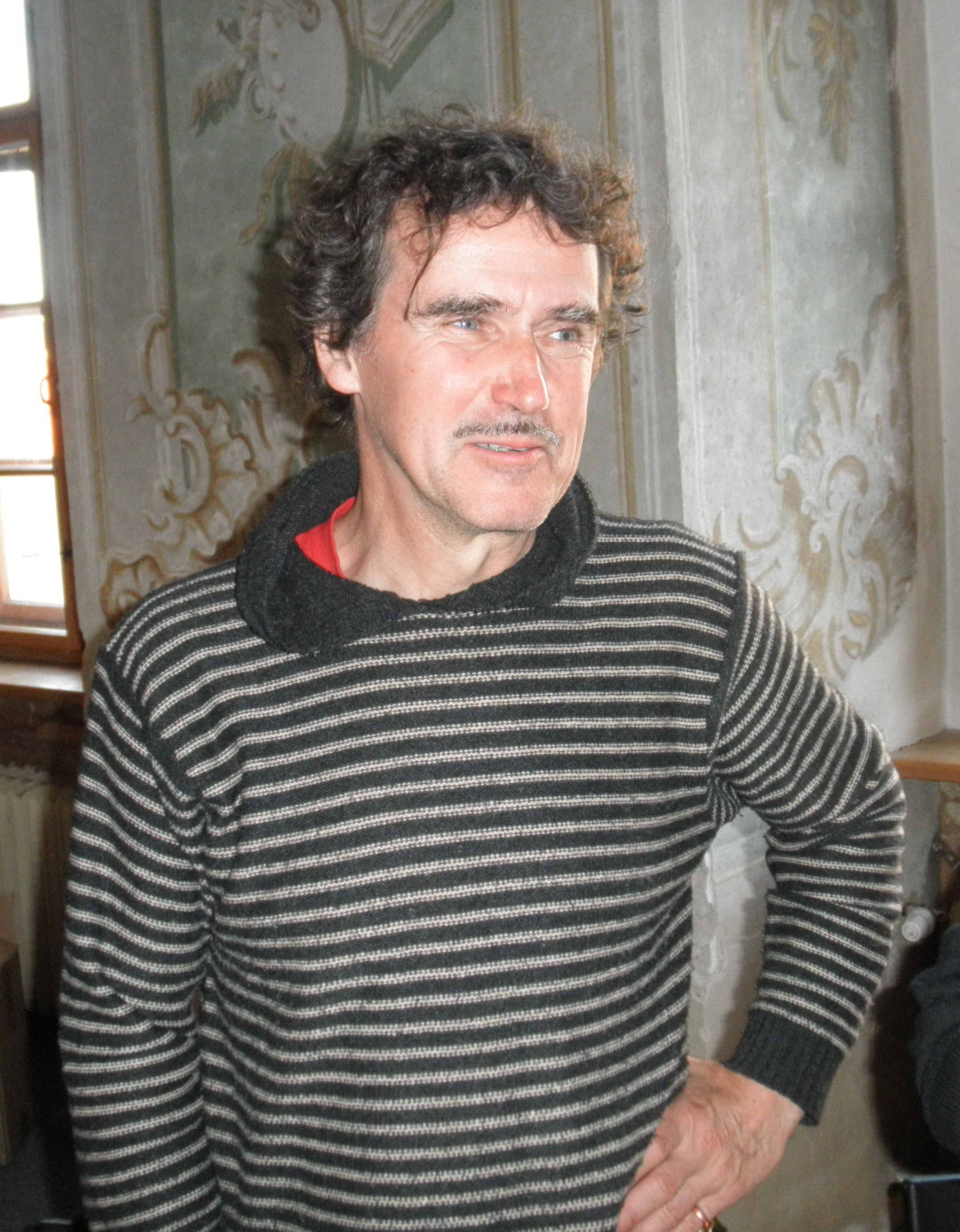
František Skála (2013)

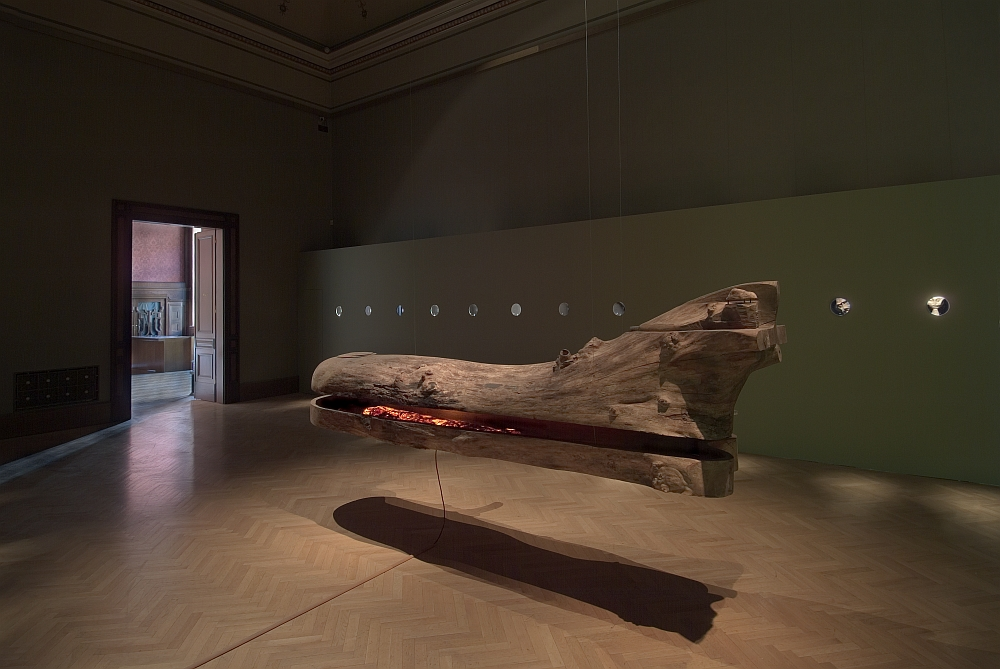
A sculpture by František Skála. Galerie Rudolfinum.

František Skála (born 1956 in Prague) is a Czech sculptor, painter, children's book illustrator, musician, and dancer. He was part of one of the earliest post-modern Czech art groups, known as Tvrdohlaví (The Stubborn Ones) formed in 1987.

== Life and career ==
Skála studied woodcarving at Secondary Applied Arts School (SUPŠ) in Prague from 1971 to 1975 and in 1982 graduated from the University of Applied Arts (VŠUP) in Prague in film and television graphics.

His initial career was as an illustrator of children's books, and he won a number of awards in this field. In 1995, he represented the Czech Republic with his illustrations at the Frankfurt International Book Fair. His comic series The Great Travels of Hair and Chin was intended to be made into an animated feature film, and Skála worked on the project for several years, though in the end the project was not completed.

As well as illustration, he began to be known from the beginning of the 1980s as a sculptor and creator of objects and installations. He presented his works at both solo exhibitions and joint exhibitions with his colleagues from the art group Tvrdohlaví (The Stubborn Ones), active from 1987 to 1991, which was one of the earliest post-modern art groups in the Czech art scene, and of which Skála was a founder member. He is also a member of a number of other art collectives, including: Bude konec světa (BKS; The End of the World is Coming), he is Commander of the Order of the Green Ladybird (Řád zelené berušky), and a member of the music groups Malý taneční orchestr Universal (the Universal small dance band), which performs popular music from the communist era of Czechoslovakia in a humorous fashion, and Finský barok (Finnish Baroque). He is a member of the Sklep theatre company, and the vocal trio Tros Sketos.

In 1990, he received an honourable mention in the Jindřich Chalupecký Award, and the following year won the main award, founded and presented by Václav Havel. The prize awards a three-month residential fellowship at the Headlands Center for the Arts in San Francisco in the United States.

From 1992, he worked on designs for the interiors of the performance areas of the Akropolis Palace in Prague.

In 1993, he was chosen to represent the Czech Republic at the 45th Venice Biennale. He made the 850 km journey to Italy on foot and then displayed drawings from the journey, along with fragile objects made of items he had found on the way, in the Czech Pavilion. He has also been a guest artist at art universities in Australia and the USA.

According to the Czech Republic's official website, his work demonstrated a "peculiar poeticism", and his work is distinctive for the wide range of materials, including found objects, that he utilises, as well as the ironic humour in his work.
