= List of Czech painters =

This is a list of Czech painters. According to Czech Radio, the most famous Czech painters are Václav Brožík, Josef Čapek, František Kupka, Josef Lada, Josef Mánes, Alphonse Mucha, Jakub Schikaneder, Antonín Slavíček, Toyen and Jan Zrzavý.

== A ==
- Miroslav Adámek
- Mikoláš Aleš
- Jiří Anderle
- Jaroslav Augusta
- Jan Autengruber

== B ==
- Karel Balcar
- Lojza Baránek
- Vojtěch Bartoněk
- Břetislav Bartoš
- Viktor Barvitius
- Jan Bauch
- Alois Beer
- Josef Konstantin Beer
- Jaroslav Benda
- Karel Benedík
- Vincenc Beneš
- Dagmar Berková
- František Bílkovský
- Oldřich Blažíček
- Josef Bolf
- Adolf Born
- Josef Bosáček
- Václav Boštík
- Vladimír Boudník
- Petr Brandl
- Zdenka Braunerová
- Oskar Brázda
- Jaroslav Brožek
- Václav Brožík
- Vratislav Hugo Brunner
- Alois Bubák
- Zdeněk Burian
- Jan Burka

== C ==
- Josef Čapek
- František Ringo Čech
- Jaroslav Čermák
- Jaroslav Černý
- Josef Černý
- Věnceslav Černý
- František Chalupa
- Antonín Chittussi
- Tomáš Císařovský
- Alfons von Czibulka

== D ==
- Alén Diviš
- Čeněk Dobiáš
- Václav Dosbaba
- Hana Dostalová
- František Roman Dragoun
- Valentin Držkovic
- Josef Dubiel von LeRach
- Jan Dungel
- Ferdiš Duša
- Jiří Dvořák
- Bohumír Dvorský

== E ==
- Zvonimír Eichler

== F ==
- Bedřich Feigl
- Stanislav Feikl
- Josef Fiala
- Emil Filla
- Hugo Anton Fisher
- Luma von Flesch-Brunningen
- Jan Florian
- Viktor Foerster
- Karel Franta
- Vladimír Franz
- Emanuel Salomon Friedberg-Mírohorský

== G ==
- Norbert Grund

== H ==
- Věra Hainzová
- Jan Kryštof Handke
- Jan František Händl
- Bedřich Havránek
- Jan Jiří Heinsch
- Josef Vojtěch Hellich
- Josef Hlinomaz
- Vlastislav Hofman
- František Horčička
- Helga Hošková-Weissová
- Antonín Hudeček
- Jakub Husník
- Vojtěch Hynais

== J ==
- Jan Quirin Jahn
- Václav Jansa
- Ludmila Janovská
- Karel Javůrek
- František Cína Jelínek
- Jiří Jelínek
- Felix Jenewein
- Jakub Jerabek
- Miloš Jiránek
- Vojtěch Benedikt Juhn
- Václav Junek
- Alfréd Justitz

== K ==
- Dusan Kadlec
- Vilém Kandler
- Adolf Kašpar
- František Kaván
- Karel Klíč
- Jano Köhler
- Jan Konůpek
- Adolf Kosárek
- Jan Kotěra
- Jan Kotík
- Josef Kramolín
- Jan Křesadlo
- Jiří Kroha
- Ludvík Kuba
- Vojtěch Kubašta
- Otakar Kubín
- Bohumil Kubišta
- Oldřich Kulhánek
- Jan Kupecký
- František Kupka
- Petr Kvíčala

== L ==
- Josef Lada
- Otakar Lebeda
- Felix Ivo Leicher
- Antonín Lhota
- Kamil Lhoták
- Adolf Liebscher
- Karel Liebscher
- Josef Liesler
- Emanuel Krescenc Liška
- Jan Kryštof Liška

== M ==
- Vincenc Makovský
- Antonín Mánes
- Josef Mánes
- Quido Mánes
- Amalie Mánesová
- Julius Mařák
- Luděk Marold
- Herbert Masaryk
- Jan Matulka
- Mikuláš Medek
- Alphonse Mucha
- František Muzika

== N ==
- František Mořic Nágl
- Josef Matěj Navrátil
- Augustin Němejc
- Vladimír Novák
- Jan Nowopacký

== O ==
- Jakub Obrovský
- Viktor Oliva
- Emil Orlík
- Eduard Ovčáček

== P ==
- Milan Peric
- Ivo Pešák
- August Bedřich Piepenhagen
- Charlotte Piepenhagen-Mohr
- Soběslav Pinkas
- Maximilian Pirner
- Otto Placht
- Miluše Poupětová
- Jan Preisler
- Vojtěch Preissig
- Antonín Procházka
- Jaro Procházka
- Jindřich Prucha
- Karel Purkyně

== R ==
- Ignác Raab
- Václav Rabas
- Václav Radimský
- Josef Jáchym Redelmayer
- Václav Vavřinec Reiner
- Zdeněk Rykr
- Jaroslav Róna

== S ==
- Joseph Ignatz Sadler
- Jakub Schikaneder
- Hanuš Schwaiger
- Vojtěch Sedláček
- Otakar Sedloň
- Alfred Seifert
- František Sequens
- Jaroslav Šerých
- Josef Šíma
- T. F. Šimon
- František Skála
- Karel Škréta
- Antonín Slavíček
- Václav Špála
- Karel Štěch
- Jitka Štenclová
- Max Švabinský
- Karel Svoboda
- Karel Svolinský

== T ==
- František Tkadlík
- Toyen
- Jan Trampota
- Jiří Trnka
- Václav Turek

== U ==
- Joža Uprka

== V ==
- Vladimír Vašíček
- Martin Velíšek
- Jaroslav Věšín
- Jan Vilímek
- František Vláčil
- Jan Antonín Vocásek

== W ==
- Alois Wachsman
- Bedřich Wachsmann
- Josef Wagner the Younger
- Karel Wellner
- Vilém Wünsche

== Z ==
- Adolf Zábranský
- Ladislav Žák
- Josef Zelený
- František Ženíšek
- Stanislav Zippe
- Karel Zlín
- Jan Zrzavý
- Vladimír Županský
- František Bohumír Zvěřina

== See also ==
- Czech art
- List of Czech artists by date
- List of Czech women artists
- List of lists of painters by nationality
