= Jaroslav Černý =

Jaroslav Černý may refer to:

- Jaroslav Černý (footballer) (born 1979), Czech footballer
- Jaroslav Černý (painter) (1904–1984), Czech painter
- Jaroslav Černý (Egyptologist) (1898–1970), Czech Egyptologist
