= Dobias =

Dobias or Dobiaš is a surname. Notable people with the surname include:

- Čeněk Dobiáš (1919–1980), Czech painter
- Frank Dobias (1902–?), Austrian-born American children's books illustrator
- Josef Dobiáš (1886–1981), Czech chess player
- Karol Dobiaš (born 1947), Slovak football player
- Timon Dobias (born 1989), Slovak football player
- Václav Dobiáš (1909–1978), Czech composer
- Vojtěch Dobiáš (born 2000), Czech ice hockey player
