= Josef Bosáček =

Czech painter (1857–1934)

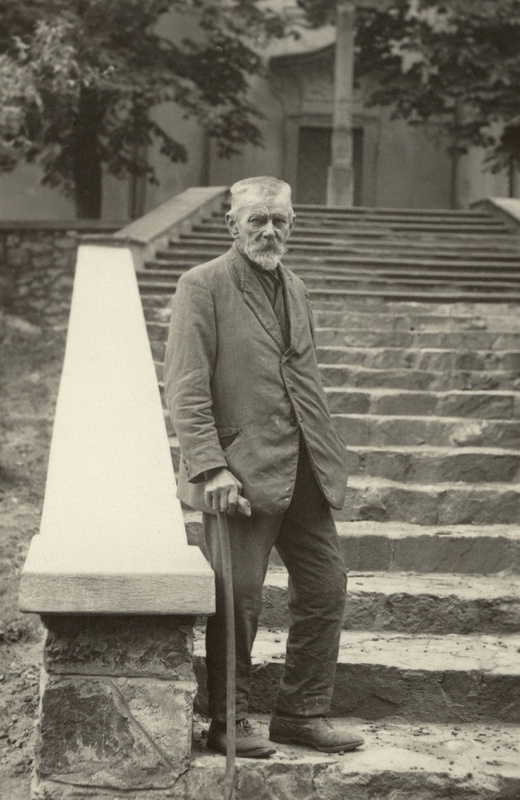
Josef Bosáček at Maková hora near Příbram, cca 1933

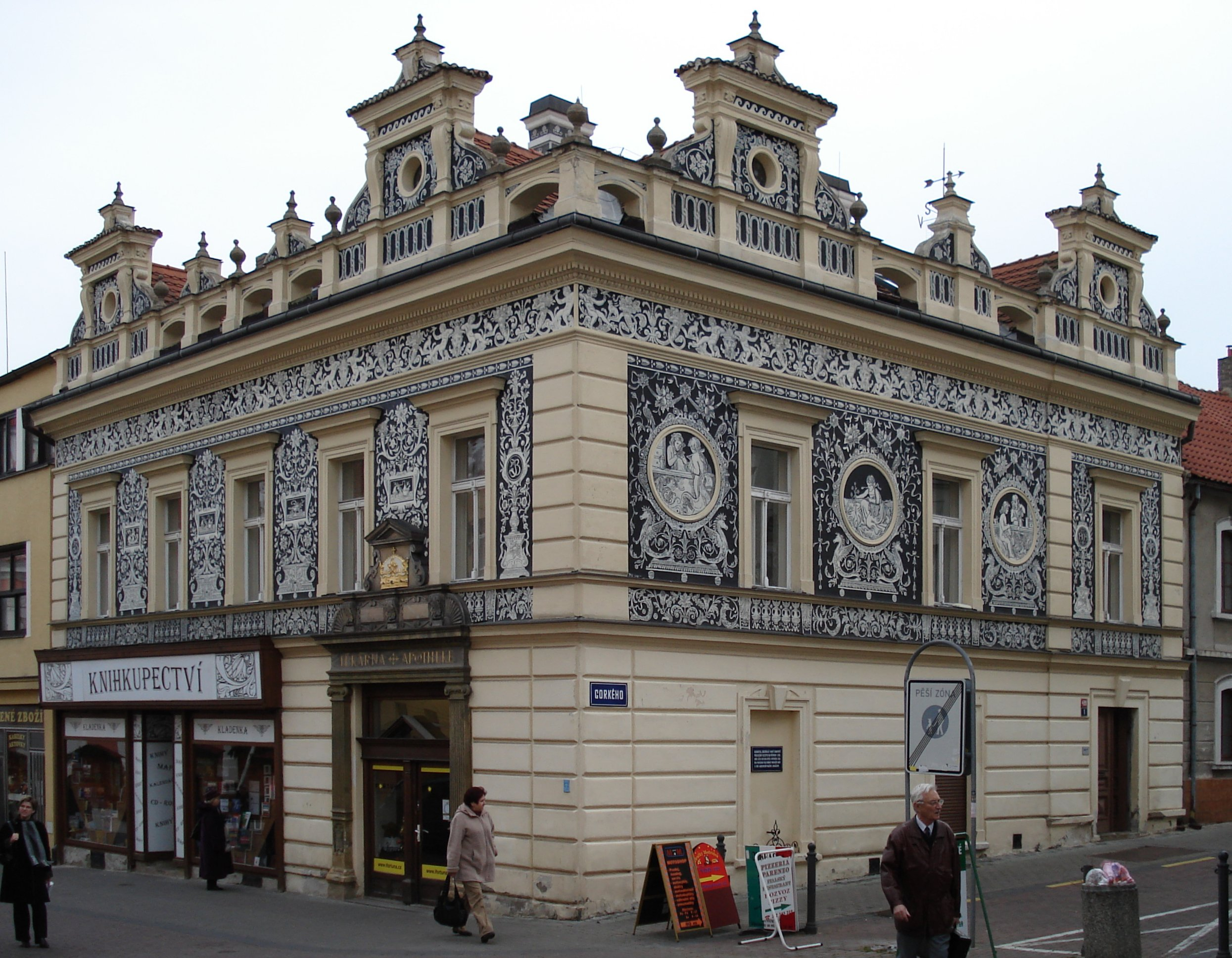
Neo-Renaissance house in Kladno with artistic work by Mikoláš Aleš and Josef Bosáček.

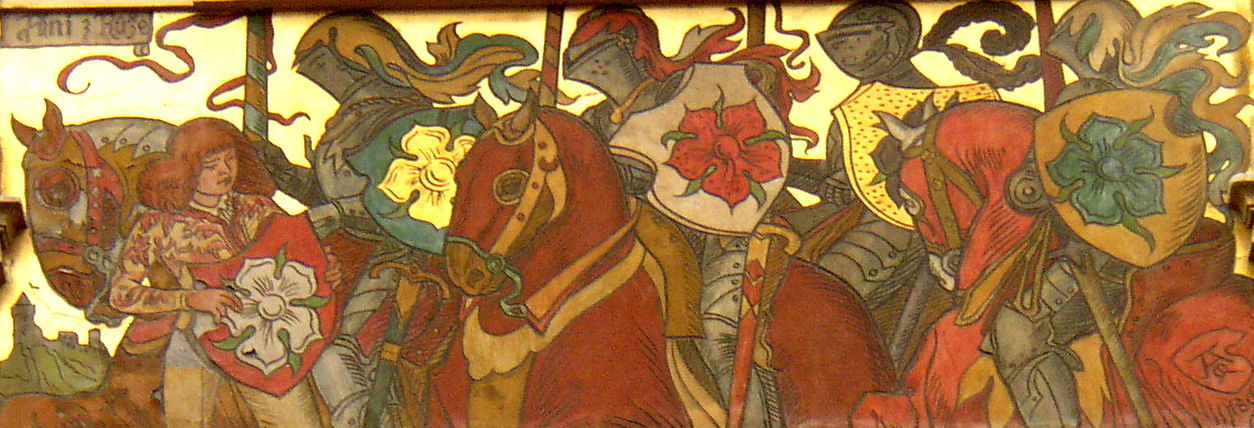
Lords of the Rose, mural by Mikoláš Aleš and Josef Bosáček, Plzeň, Nerudova 10.

Josef Bosáček (17 February 1857 – 5 September 1934 Příbram) was a Czech painter and classical graffiti artist.

He was a pupil of Gabriel Wüger, a Benedictine and professor of the Painting Academy in Rome. In 1886, he enrolled at the Academy of Fine Arts in Prague and studied under Professor František Sequens, Antonín Lhota and Julius Mařák. During his studies, he met Mikoláš Aleš, with whom he collaborated on various frescoes and graffiti on facades in the 1890s. In 1896, 1900, and 1903–1907, he worked for the builder Rudolf Štech in Plzeň. After his brother's (who was a priest) death in 1918, he became a hermit and painted frescoes related to Jesus Christ in a pilgrimage church at Maková hora near Příbram. He died in 1934 in Příbram hospital.

== Literature ==
- ŠTOGROVÁ, Jarmila. Zapomenutý malíř a poustevník na Makové hoře Josef Bosáček (1857–1934), přítel Mikoláše Alše. Podbrdsko, 2008, čís. XV.. ISSN 1211-5169.
- BOSÁČEK, Josef. Dopisy Mikoláši Alšovi [CDROM]. Příprava vydání Jiří Egermaier, Jarmila Štogrová. 2007.
- Dr. Ludmila Mašková. Zapomenutý Josef Bosáček. Český dialog, 2007, čís. 3.-4.. Dostupné online.
- EGERMAIER, Jiří. Zapomenutý Josef Bosáček a jeho galerie pod širým nebem. Písek: IRES & Prácheňské nakladatelství, 2004. ISBN 80-86566-24-2.
- ROCH-KOČVARA, Stanislav. Za příbramským malířem Josefem Bosáčkem. Příbram: OKS, 1985.
- TOMAN, Prokop. Nový slovník československých výtvarných umělců. 3. vyd. Svazek 1. Praha: Rudolf Ryšavý, 1947. Heslo Bosáček, Josef, s. 81.
- MÍČKO, Miroslav; SVOBODA, Emanuel. Mikoláš Aleš, Nástěnné malby. Praha : SNKLHU, 1955.
- KUDRNA, F. Po stopách Mikoláše Alše. Český deník, Plzeň, 1932–1933.

== See also ==
- List of Czech painters
