= Karel Zlín =

Czech painter, sculptor and poet

Karel Zlín, also known as Karel Machálek (born 23 July 1937 in Zlín) is a Czech painter, sculptor and poet.

After studying Applied Arts Secondary School in Uherské Hradiště he studied at Academy of Fine Arts in Prague under Vlastimil Rada and Karel Souček from 1957 to 1963. The following year, he began work, mostly paintings and illustrating books. He has designed dozens of movie posters.

Besides artistic activities, Zlín is also a noted poet; his first collection of poems was published in 1969. In recent years he has also translated the works of other authors.

In 1976 he settled in Paris and opened a studio in the Rue du Louvre. In recent years, he has been inspired in his artwork by his trips to Egypt.

== See also ==
- List of Czech painters
