= Junek =

List of surnames

Junek (Czech feminine: Junková) is a surname. Notable people with this surname includes:

- Eliška Junková (1900–1994), Czech automobile racer
- František Junek (1907–1970), Czech footballer
- Leo Junek (1899–1993), Croatian-French painter
- Václav Junek (born 1951), Czech businessmen
