= Zvonimír Eichler =

Czech painter, graphic artist, and illustrator

Zvonimír Eichler (21 January 1903 – 17 February 1975) was a Czech painter, graphic artist and illustrator. He studied at the Prague Academy of Fine Arts from 1923 to 1929 under Professor J. F. Thiele, K. Krattner and W. Nowak. He was a member of the North Bohemian Artists Association and the Association of Visual Artists. He generally painted rural landscapes and flowers.

Eichler was born on 21 January 1903 in Karlovac, Croatia. He studied at the Academy of Fine Art in Prague, in the years 1923–1929. His professors were Jakub Obrovský, F. Thiele, K. Krattner and Willi Nowak. He became a full-time professor of art in Trencin, and later in Prague. He was a member of the North Bohemian Artists Association and the Purkyne Art Club. He died during work on 17 February 1975.

== See also ==
- List of Czech painters
