= František Bílkovský =

Czech painter, graphic designer and illustrator (1909–1998)

František Bílkovský (10 August 1909 in Mrákotín – 18 October 1998 in Brno) was a Czech painter, graphic designer and illustrator.

== Biography ==
He was born into the family of a shoemaker in the village of Mrákotín.

After graduating from high school he moved to Brno in 1928 where he worked until his retirement as an engineer and devoted much time to his own artistic creation, in which he used almost every known graphic technique, using lithography, etching, drypoint and aquatint etc.

In his life he created over 400 works including some 115 illustrations in books. His work is represented in private collections, but also in the collections of the National Gallery Prague, Moravian Gallery in Brno and other major institutions.

He died on 18 October 1998 in Brno and is buried in his native Mrákotín.

== See also ==
- List of Czech painters
