= Josef Bolf =

Czech painter

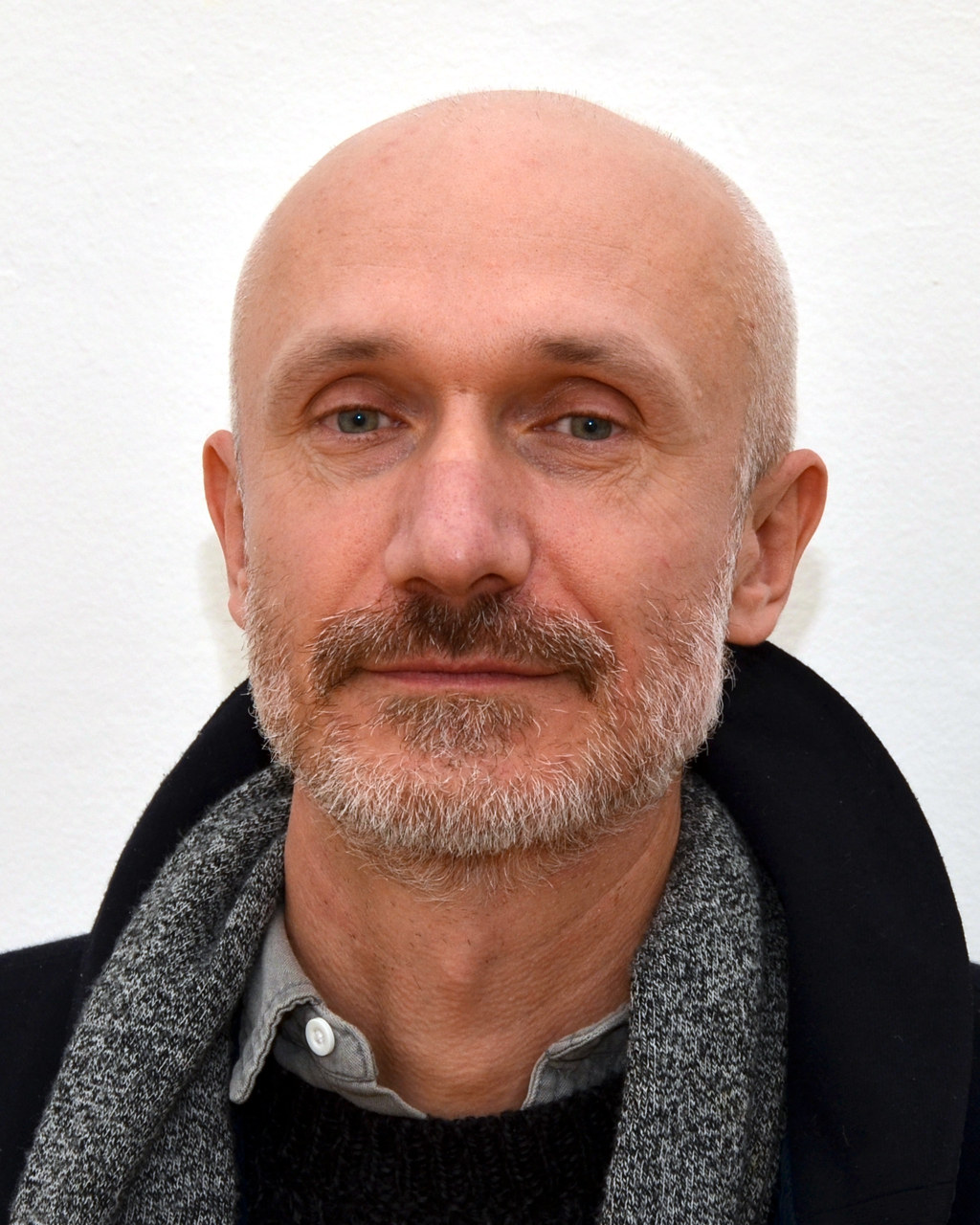
- Josef Bolf (2017) foto Jindřich Nosek
- Born: October 7, 1971 (age 54); Prague; Czechoslovakia
- Education: Academy of Fine Arts, Prague
- Known for: Painter

Josef Bolf (born October 7, 1971 in Prague) is a Czech painter. He studied at the Academy between 1990–1998. In 1995 he studied at Kongsthögskolan (Stockholm) and in 1996 at the Akademie der Bildenden Künste in Stuttgart. From 1996 to 2002 he was a member of the art group Bezhlavý jezdec.

Bolf's creation captures the strange characters, often suffering, sometimes half-animal. His paintings are often considered depressed, gloomy, sad, melancholy. His ideas often stem from childhood spent in the southern city of Prague.

== Scholarships and residences ==
- 2007 ISCP (International Studio and Curatorial Program), New York, USA
- 2006 Europäische Künstlerhaus, Freising, Germany
- 1996 Akademie der Bildende Künst, Stuttgart, Germany
- 1995 Kongsthögskolan, Stockholm, Sweden

== Awards ==
- 2011 Umělec roku

== Representations in collections ==
- 8smička, Humpolec, Czech Republic
- AMC Collezione Coppola, Vicenza, Italy
- Collett Prague/Munich, Czech Republic/Germany
- Eileen S. Kaminsky Family Foundation, Jersey City, New Jersey, USA
- Fait Gallery, Brno, Czech Republic
- Galerie Klatovy/Klenová, Czech Republic
- GAVU, Cheb, Czech Republic
- GHMP, Praha, Czech Republic
- Hudson Valley Center for Contemporary Art, Peekskill, New York, USA
- Marek Collection, Brno, Czech Republic
- Moravian Gallery, Brno, Czech Republic
- National Gallery, Praha, Czech Republic
- Olomouc Museum of Art, Czech Republic
- Pudil Family Foundation, Praha, Czech Republic
- Robert Runták Collection, Olomouc, Czech Republic

== Bibliography ==
- 2018 Vaňous, Petr. Inverse Romanticism. Praha: Galerie Rudolfinum
- 2017 Brabec, Jaroslav. Orbis Artis: Josef Bolf. Praha: Česká televize
- 2016 Urban, Otto M. Life Is Painful and Breeds Disappointment: Massakr Vol.1 - Lovecraft. Plzeň: Galerie města Plzně
- 2015 Vaňous, Petr. Rezonance: Načeradský – Typlt – Bolf. Praha: BIGGBOSS
- 2012 Bolf, Josef; Štind Ondřej. Mondschein. Praha: Argo
- 2012 Urban, Otto M. A Mirror from the Abyss. Paris: Galerie Dukan Hourdequin
- 2010 Barényi, Peter. Video report about the exhibition Unheimliche. Bratislava: Artyčok.tv
- 2010 Vaňous, Petr. Ještě místo - pustá zem. Plzeň: Západočeská galerie
- 2009 Pospiszyl, Tomáš. Josef Bolf. Praha: Divus
- 2009 Vidlička, Jan. Interview about exhibition You Are Not You, You Are Me. Praha: Artyčok.tv
- 2007 Jeřábková, Edith; Vítková, Lenka. Lovci Lebek. Klatovy: Galerie U Bílého jednorožce

== See also ==
- List of Czech painters
