= Josef Konstantin Beer =

German painter

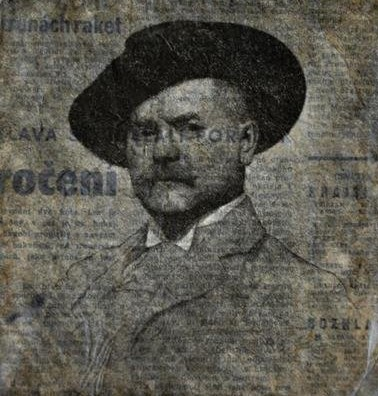
Josef Konstantin Beer

Josef Konstantin Beer (11 March 1862 – 27 February 1933) was a German Bohemian painter, restorer and art collector.

== Biography ==
Beer was born on 11 March 1862 in Most, Bohemia, Austrian Empire. He left his home city in 1879 and went to Vienna, where he graduated from the School of Arts and then went to the Academy of Fine Arts. In 1886, he studied painting in Karlsruhe and the following year in Lübeck. Already during his studies he had restored some works of art from the 14th to 18th century in the Dean of Most. In 1891 he became assistant to the restoration studio of the Old Pinakothek in Munich. In 1892 he went to Budapest, where he became a leading restorer and conservator of the National Gallery. He worked and lived there until his death on 27 February 1933.

During his life, he assembled a collection of 218 paintings, which included his own works, the works of old masters and paintings by contemporaries. This collection, together with the other items in his will he bequeathed to the museum in his hometown of Most.

In 1935, an exhibition of paintings from his collection took place. In 1993, the legacy of his paintings appeared in an exhibition of European art masters of the 16th to 19th century in the collections of the Museum in Most.

Most of his works are from the period 1881–1892 during his period of studies. During his time in Budapest, he was mainly devoted to restoration work.

== See also ==
- List of Czech painters
- List of German painters
