= Jan Florian =

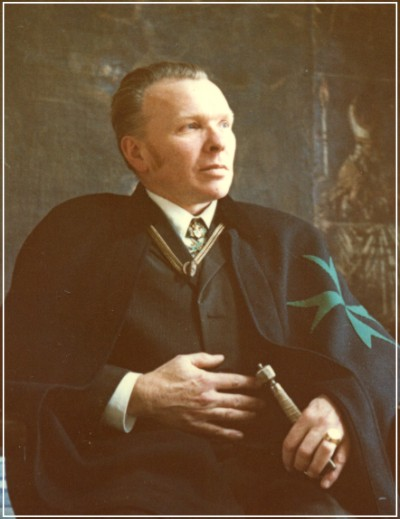
Jan Florian

Jan Florian (1921–2007) was a Czech painter.

== See also ==
- List of Czech painters
