= Hana Dostalová =

Czech artist (1890–1981)

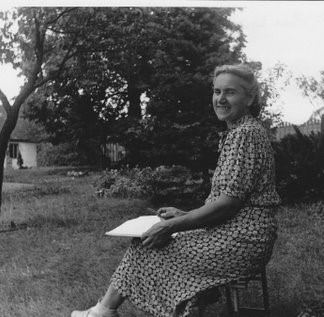
- Born: 11 November 1890; Podebrady, Austria-Hungary
- Died: 25 February 1981 (aged 90); Prague, Czechoslovakia
- Known for: Painting, Illustration

Hana Dostalová (1890–1981) was a Czech painter, illustrator, textile and glass designer . She was the daughter of actress Marie Horská-Kallmünzerová, sister of actress Leopolda Dostalová and director Karel Dostal.

== Literature ==
- TOMAN, Prokop. Nový slovník československých výtvarných umělců. 3. vyd. Svazek 1. Praha : Rudolf Ryšavý, 1947. Heslo Dostálová, Hana, s. 172.
- TOMAN, Prokop; TOMAN, Prokop Hugo. Nový slovník československých výtvarných umělců. 3. vyd. Svazek 3. Praha : SNKLHU, 1955. Heslo Dostálová, Hana.

== See also ==
- List of Czech painters
