= Dagmar Berková =

Dagmar Berková (6 June 1922 in Vienna – 29 May 2002 in Prague) was a Czech graphic designer, illustrator and painter. She was predominant in children's book illustration, in particular the illustrations for Lewis Carroll's Alice in Wonderland or Hans Christian Andersen's fairy tales.

== See also ==
- List of Czech painters
