= Tomáš Císařovský =

Czech painter

Tomáš Císařovský (born 2 January 1962 in Prague) is a Czech painter.

From 1978 to 1982 he studied in Prague SUPŠ in shaping and carving wood, and later studied at the Prague Academy (1983–1988).

He paints substantially in oil, with bold colors, ranging from portraits and figurative scenes to landscapes as diverse as glaciers and volcanos.

He works in thematic cycles. He painted a series of political paintings, notably a painting entitled Lover in Prague (2004) which is a portrait of Joseph Goebbels. He regularly exhibits in both the Czech Republic and foreign galleries. His work is represented in public and private collections. He lives and works in Prague. Notable paintings include Z deníku dědy legionáře (1989), Naty, přepni to! (1994), Bez koní (1996) Lover in Prague (2004), Prázdniny v Čechách (2006).

== See also ==
- List of Czech painters
