= Josef Wagner the Younger =

Czech sculptor and professor (1901-1957)

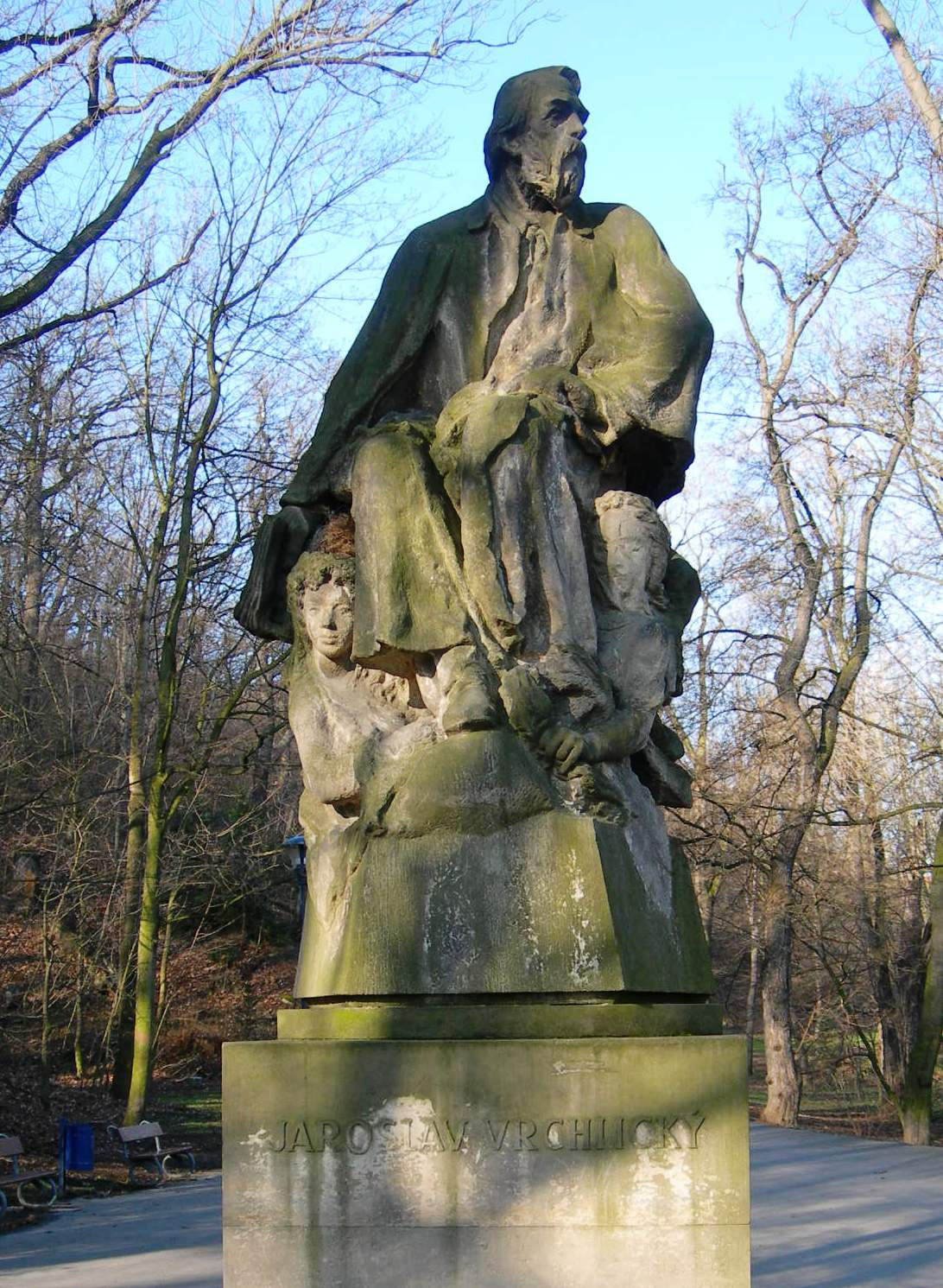
Statue of Josef Wagner in Prague

Josef Wagner the Younger (March 2, 1901 - February 10, 1957) was a Czech painter and sculptor.

A pupil of Jan Štursa and Josef Mařatka, he studied sculpture at the Academy of Fine Arts from 1922 to 1926. He was later a professor at the Art School in Prague. Here he met his future wife, Marie Kulhánková, a sculptor, with whom he had two sons, who later became artists themselves.

Warm stone colors best suited his own personal style, inspired by archaic Greece and the Czech Baroque style.

There is a statue in his memory in Prague.

== Selected works ==
- Ležící torzo, 1935
- Poezie, 1936
- Oblaka a Země, 1938
- Útisk, 1944
- Utrpení, 1947
- Pomník povstání ve Světlé Hůrce ve Slezsku, 1928–29
- Pomník Jaroslava Vrchlického na Petříně v Praze, 1936–56
- Pomník Bedřicha Smetany v Karlových Varech, 1936–49
- Pomník padlým ve Dvoře Králové, 1948–54.

== Literature ==
- J. Pečírka, Sochař Josef Wagner. Prague 1959
- J. M. Tomeš, Sochař Josef Wagner. Prague 1985

== See also ==
- List of Czech painters
