= František Chalupa =

Czech painter and illustrator

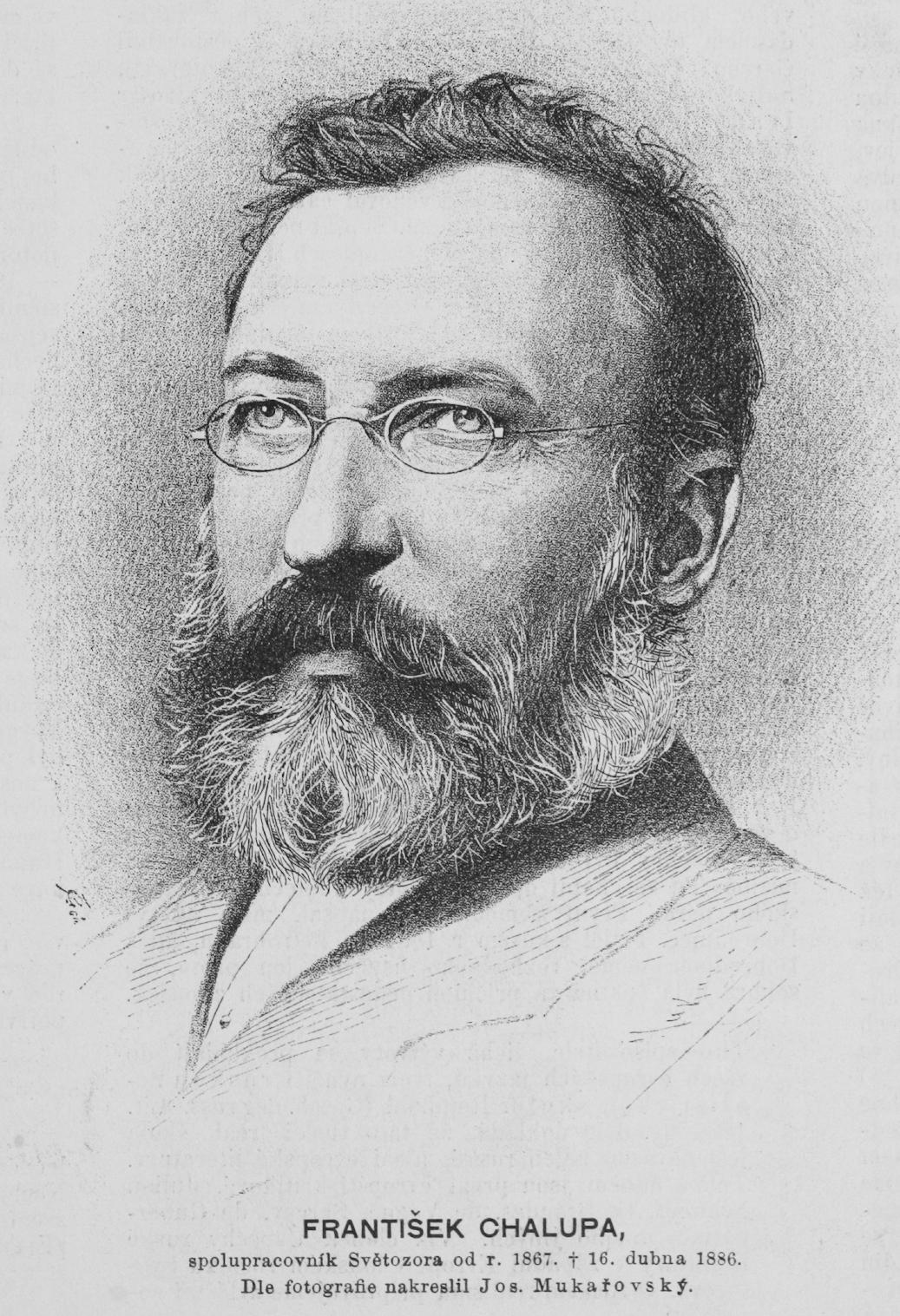

František Chalupa (1828–1887) was a Czech painter and illustrator. As a painter he focused exclusively on landscape and architecture, almost always from the Czech Republic. His illustrations regularly appeared in magazines. At the end of his life he engaged in Renaissance composition ornaments. His last work was a painting of a windmill in Bautzen.

== See also ==
- List of Czech painters
