= Josef Dubiel von LeRach =

Czech artist

- Born: 1951 (age 74–75)

Josef Dubiel von LeRach (born 1951) is a Czech painter and illustrator and author of over twenty books. He studied under Professor J. Olik and at the Prague Academy of Fine Arts. He uses many different styles, mediums, and techniques. A member of the Union of Visual Artists of the Czech Republic, his work has featured on a national postage stamp with the Prime Minister and his work is displayed in several government buildings.

== See also ==
- List of Czech painters
