= Stanislav Zippe =

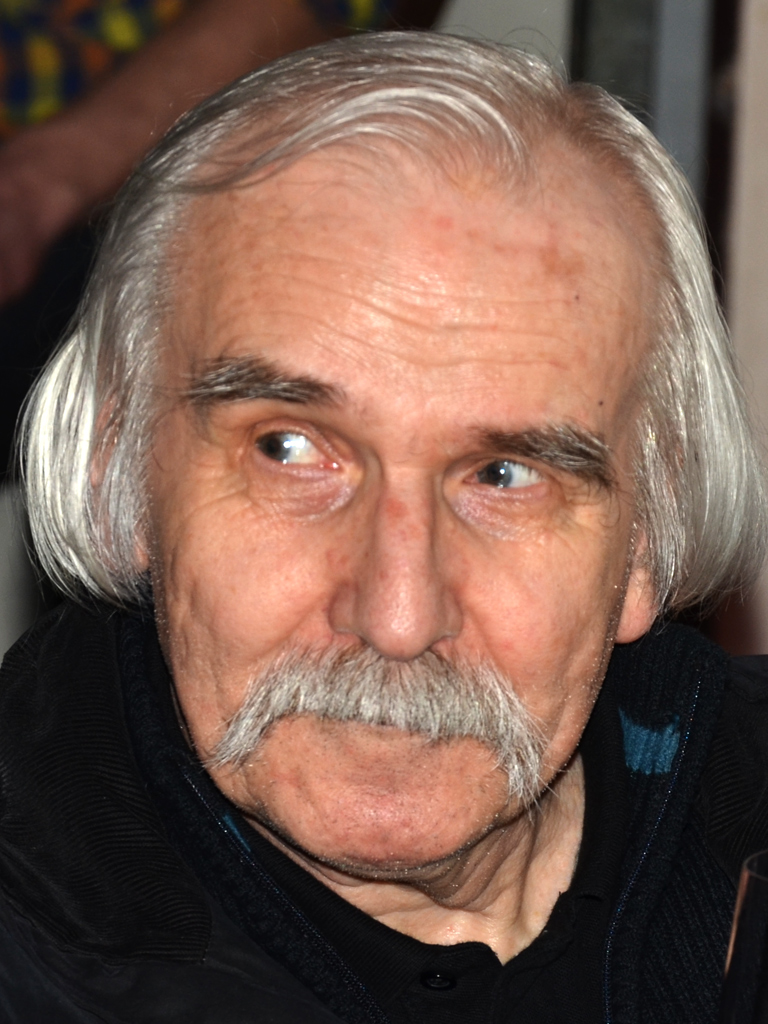
- Stanislav Zippe in 2014
- Born: 20 January 1943; Hořice, Protectorate of Bohemia and Moravia
- Died: 12 January 2024 (aged 80); Prague, Czech Republic
- Known for: sculptor, painter, artist and art teacher

Stanislav Zippe (20 January 1943 – 12 January 2024) was a Czech artist, painter and sculptor.

== Biography ==
Stanislav Zippe was born on 20 January 1943 in Hořice. He studied in art from 1957 to 1961. He deals mainly with creating sculptures and installations. He has been a member of several groups involved in arts activities creating kinetic sculptures, especially those that emphasize the relativity of space and using special effects such as crumbling in his works. In addition to creating sculptures and installations, he has also been involved in theatre set design and creating geometric abstract paintings.

== See also ==
- List of Czech painters
