= Václav Dosbaba =

Václav Dosbaba (January 8, 1945 − February 4, 2012) was a Czech painter. He has exhibited in Brno, Louny, Ostrava, Prague, Litomyšl, Zlín and abroad in the U.S., Austria. He joined the Group 4 in 1971.

== Bibliography ==
- Václav Dosbaba. In: Šlépěje. 1995, č.7, s.50-52, fot.
- Schwarz, Jan. Retrospektiva Václava Dosbaby. In: Horácké noviny. Roč. 6, 1995, (01.08.1995), s.7, fot.

== See also ==
- List of Czech painters
