= Alois Beer =

Austrian writer and painter

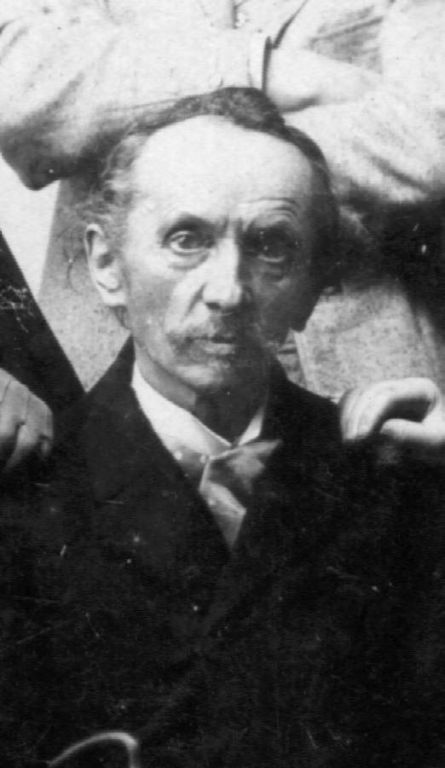
Alois Beer

Alois Beer (February 27, 1833 – October 10, 1897) was a writer and painter born in Bohemia in the Austrian Empire.

== Information ==
After his apprenticeship in 1849 he went to Vienna, Prague and Styria, all areas in the Austrian Empire. He briefly went to Bavaria. He then returned to the Austrian Empire and went to Venice, Verona and Milan and Ljubljana. In Ljubljana, he attended painting courses.

After returning to Dobruška in 1858 he opened a business. In 1862 he married and in 1863 bought the house No. 100 in Opočenský street. In 1869 his first wife died and he married a second time, unhappily.

Beer was a great promoter of technical innovations. In a small town, he was considered eccentric and often mocked. In 1886, he left his business to his son and devoted himself to painting.

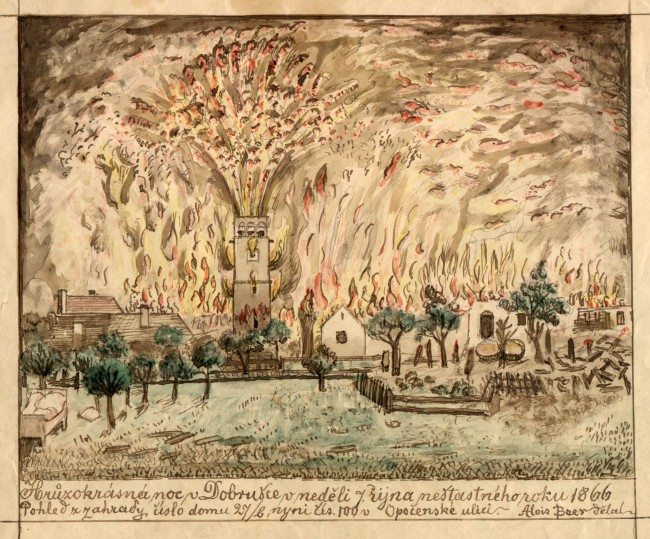
Picture of the Dobruška fire on October 7, 1866

He participated in the organization of economic and industrial exhibitions in Dobruška in 1889 and 1892. Here he received recognition and finally gained some respect from the locals. He died there in 1897.

One of his most famous works is of the major fire which broke out in Dobruška on October 7, 1866. Approximately 3500 pages of his text and images are held in the Dobruška Museum of Natural History. His texts and pictures of individual buildings, local customs, events and festivals, trade practices and tools, offer significant details of everyday life in that region in the 19th century. A Beer exhibition was organized in Prague in 1937.

== See also ==
- List of Czech painters
