= Jaroslav Šerých =

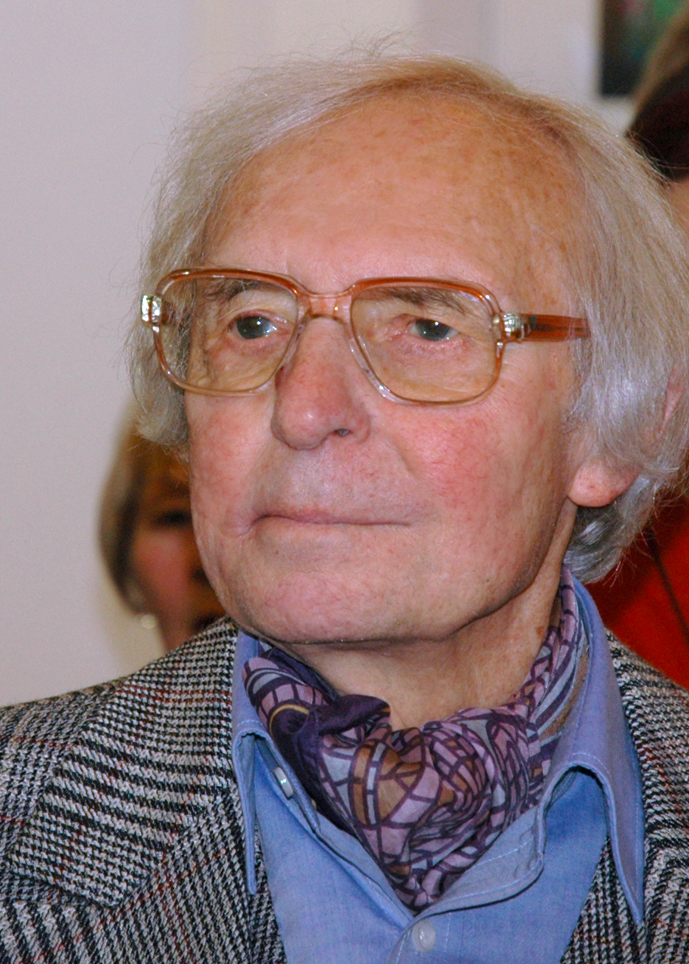
Jaroslav Šerých (2012)

Jaroslav Šerých (Czech: [ˈjaroslaf ˈʃɛriːx]; 27 February 1928 – 23 March 2014) was a Czech painter, printmaker and illustrator.

== Biography ==
Jaroslav Šerých was born in Německý Brod. He graduated from the Academy of Fine Arts (Professors Vlastimil Rada and Vladimír Pukl) in Prague in 1955 and worked there as a research student until 1960 (Professor Vladimír Silovský).

His work was mainly focussed on painting, graphic art, book illustration and monumental works in cooperation with architects. His unique, untraditional form of artistic expression lies in sensitive works on relief copper plates, many of which are decorated by the vitreous enamel technology. High quality of his illustrated book should be mentioned, too, for which he received several "book of the year" awards from various publishers. Šerých notably illustrated a number of fairy tales books, including Fairy Tales from Japan, Persian Fairy Tales, Indonesian Fairy Tales and Tales of the Uncanny.

In the 1960's he took part in numerous exhibitions with the "M 57" group and the Hollar Society. He was invited to take part in about two hundred of group exhibitions at home and abroad. He has been the subject of about a hundred one-man exhibitions in Czechoslovakia / Czech Republic and about ten abroad.

He received the Czech Medal of Merit from President of the Czech Republic Václav Klaus in the year 2008.

Šerých died on 23 March 2014 in Prague. He was 86.
