= Miroslav Adámek =

Czech painter, graphic artist and illustrator

Miroslav Adámek (18 February 1957, Vsetín – 22 January 2002, Vsetín) was a Czech painter, graphic artist and illustrator.

== Career ==
In 1976–1980, he studied graphic design at SUPS in Uherské Hradiště, then studied at the Academy with professor Souček and Kolář (1980–1986).

He was noted in particular for his paintings and drawings, which incorporated ideas from architecture, such as sand-blasted glass and ceramics. During his career he showcased his work in over fifteen exhibitions in the Czech Republic and overseas.

== See also ==
- List of Czech painters
