= Vratislav Hugo Brunner =

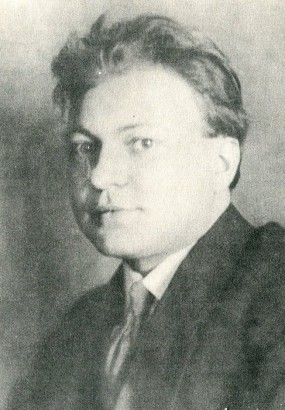
Vratislav Hugo Brunner

Vratislav Hugo Brunner (15 October 1886 in Prague – 13 July 1928 in Horní Lomnice, Kunice) was a Czech typographer, illustrator, graphic designer, cartoonist, author, toy and stage designer and painter. He significantly affected the development of Czech book graphics.

== See also ==
- List of Czech painters
