= Jaroslav Benda =

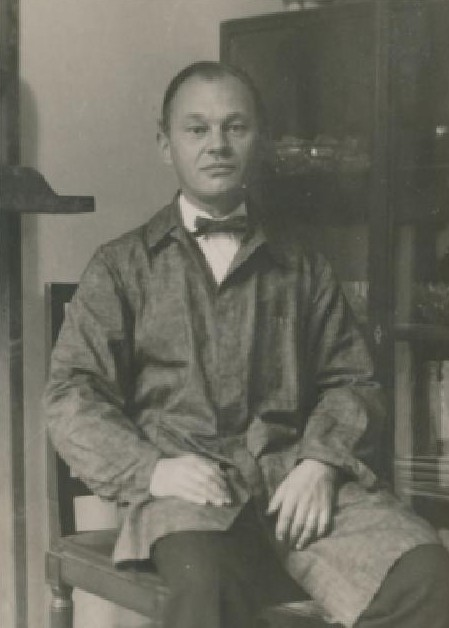
Jaroslav Benda in 1930

Jaroslav Benda (27 April 1882 – 12 January 1970) was a Czech artist. He worked as painter, graphic artist and designer of postage stamps, posters and monumental decorations. His contributions significantly affected the development of Czech book graphics.

== Biography ==
Benda was born on 27 April 1882 in Prague. He graduated from the School of Applied Arts in Prague. From 1907 to 1912, he was an editor of the magazine Světozor. He was advisor to publishers, Jan Laichtr and Jan Štenc for the proposed modification of individual books. From 1920 he was Professor of Applied Arts at the School of Applied Arts. In the years 1926–1928, he was the rector. His students included Zdeněk Seydl, Jaroslav Šváb, Antonín Strnadel, Jiří Trnka and Antonín Homolka. He died on 12 January 1970 in Prague.

== See also ==
- List of Czech painters
