= Václav Turek =

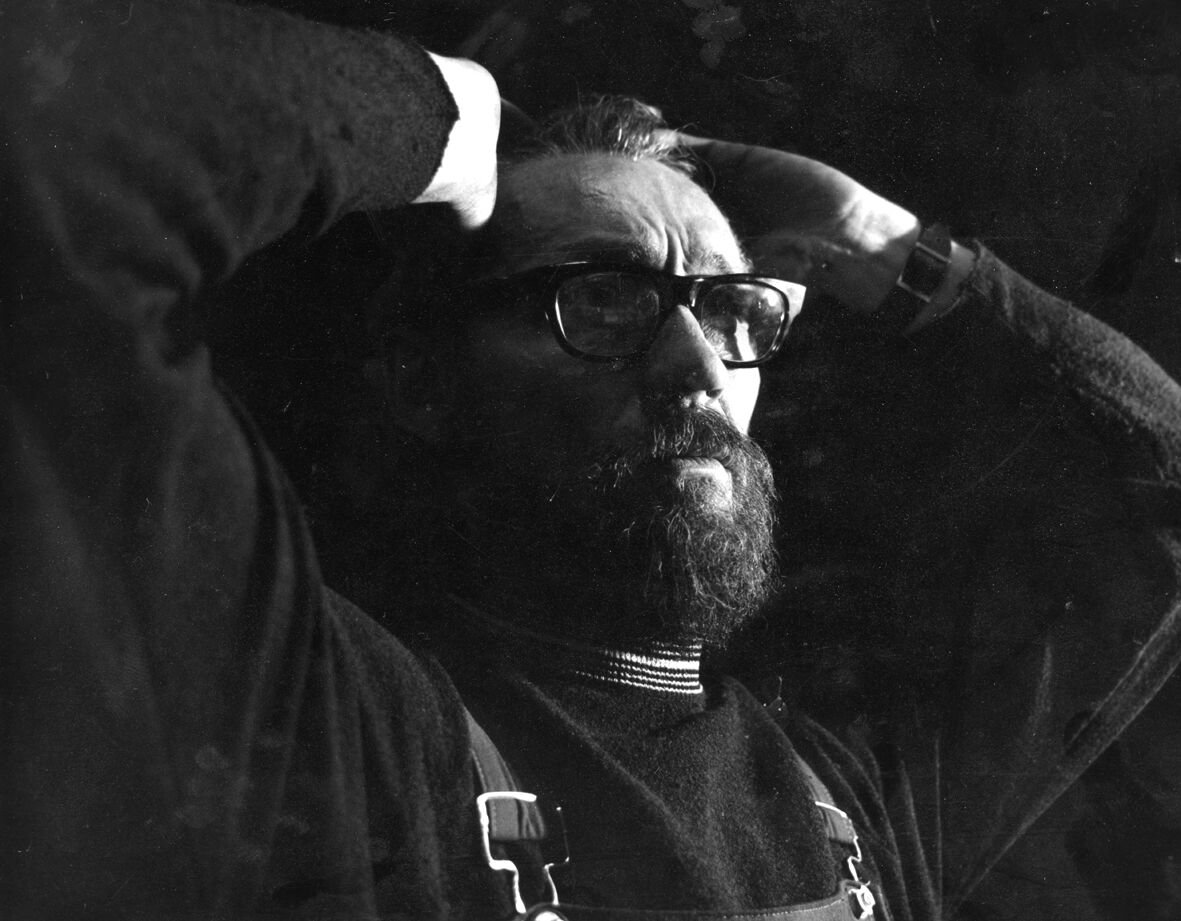
- Photo portrait of Václav Turek
- Born: 2 July 1924; Šahy, Czechoslovakia
- Died: 29 January 1988 (aged 63); Prague, Czechoslovakia
- Education: Academy of Fine Arts, Prague
- Known for: Painting, drawing, sculpture, graphics

Václav Turek (2 July 1924 – 29 January 1988) was a Czechoslovak painter, graphic artist and sculptor. He created figurative themes and landscape paintings, with a polarization of opinion between abstraction and modern Realism.

== Life ==
Turek was born on 2 July 1924 in Šahy, Czechoslovakia to a family of construction engineers. They moved to Prague in 1937.

== Studies and teaching activities ==
Turek studied at the National Graphic School under J. Vodrážka and K. Müller, then at the Academy of Fine Arts in Prague (AVU) in prof. Vlastimil Rada's studio (1945–1950). His generational colleagues were Oldřich Oplt, Josef Jíra, Ladislav Čepelák, Vladimír Tesař, Bohdan Kopecký and others. In the years 1962–1965 he received an internal research fellowship at AVU, worked as an assistant in professor V. Rada's studio and prof. Karel Souček's atelier. From the beginning of the 70s until his death in 1988, he led a separate figure drawing class (the so-called "Evening Nude") at AVU.

Turek's refusal to join the communist party, and his sister's emigration, made prevented his academic career from advancing. He remained a senior assistant, perhaps the longest serving one in the history of the Fine Art Academy in Prague.

== Work ==
In 1962 on the occasion of his first solo exhibition V. Rada wrote: "Václav Turek strives for expressing what he feels and what he has been through. They are experiences more internal than visual. I see his world, the world of his visions narrows but also focusses. Above all we are dealing with a man, his face and his fate. Everything is expressed with contemporary, low-cost and often persistent tools."

In later years, landscape painting pushed cityscapes and portrait painting to the background. His emerging hearty relationship to Southern Bohemia had a significant influence on this change. The main subject matter of his paintings became the geometrical lines belonging to the village houses' gables. Again and again in never-ending variations he placed blocks and triangles into the magical space of a landscape, out of which he assembled village houses. One can feel a pulsating life behind their walls, but it is hidden, mysterious, often surrounded by a melancholic haze. Having been present to the sad transformation of the traditional village into a heterogeneous hybrid of generic plastering, three-part windows and blocks of flats, he attempted to capture the scenery of stonewalls, baroque gates and dusty paths with flocks of geese, disappearing together with the magic of cleanliness and a feeling of deep belonging to a world of ancient traditions and certainties rising out from the past. His experience of a concrete reality is always supported by a delicate base.

The paintings' representation contains dynamics and a low-cost appearance that suppresses color diversity.

His paintings were not created effortlessly, it was always a fair and persistent fight and it took a long time before he was willing to consider a painting finished. He almost tangibly inserted a piece of himself into each painting, which is why his work radiates a mysterious energy and feelings of downfall which is the case with his pieces after 1968. His practice was concluded prematurely in the second half of the 70s, when he stopped making art due to health and gradually also psychological problems caused by the hopeless situation the society was in. He died in January 1988 without living to see the political changes he had been waiting for his whole life.

== Gallery ==
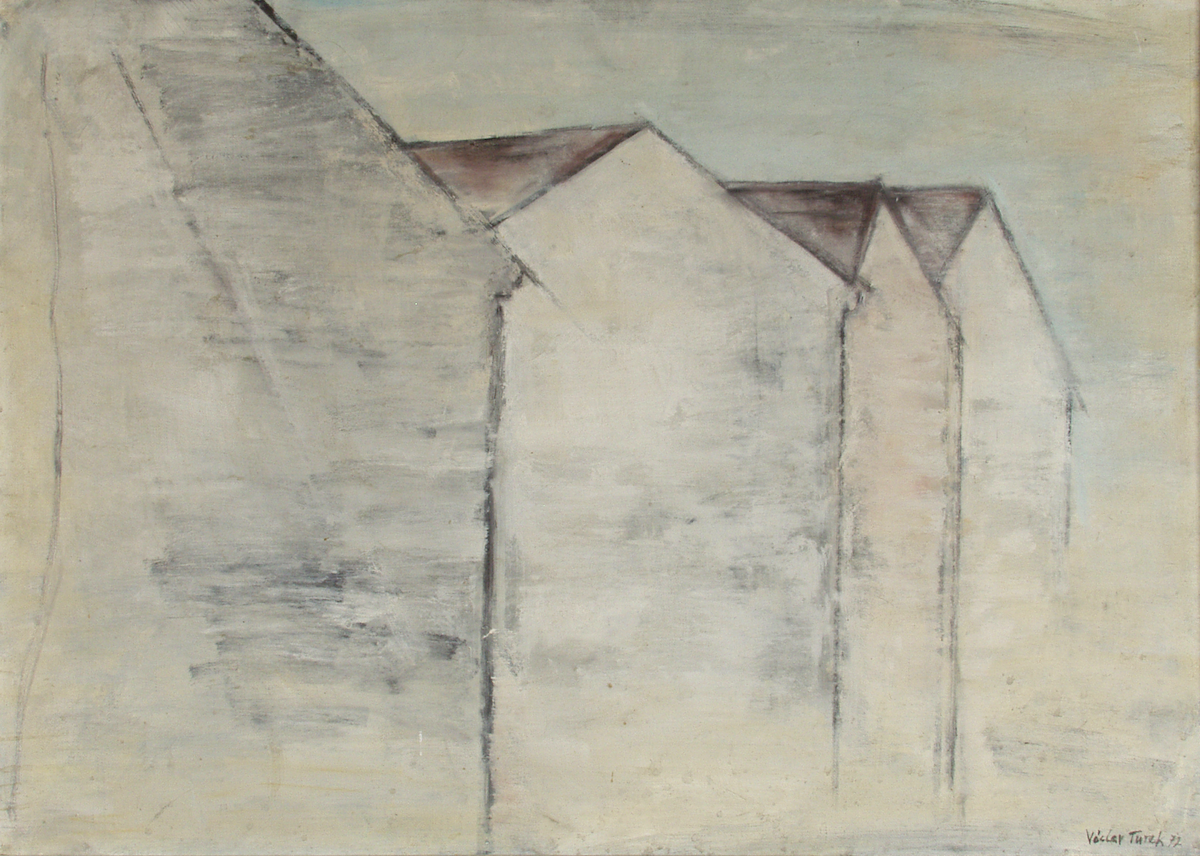

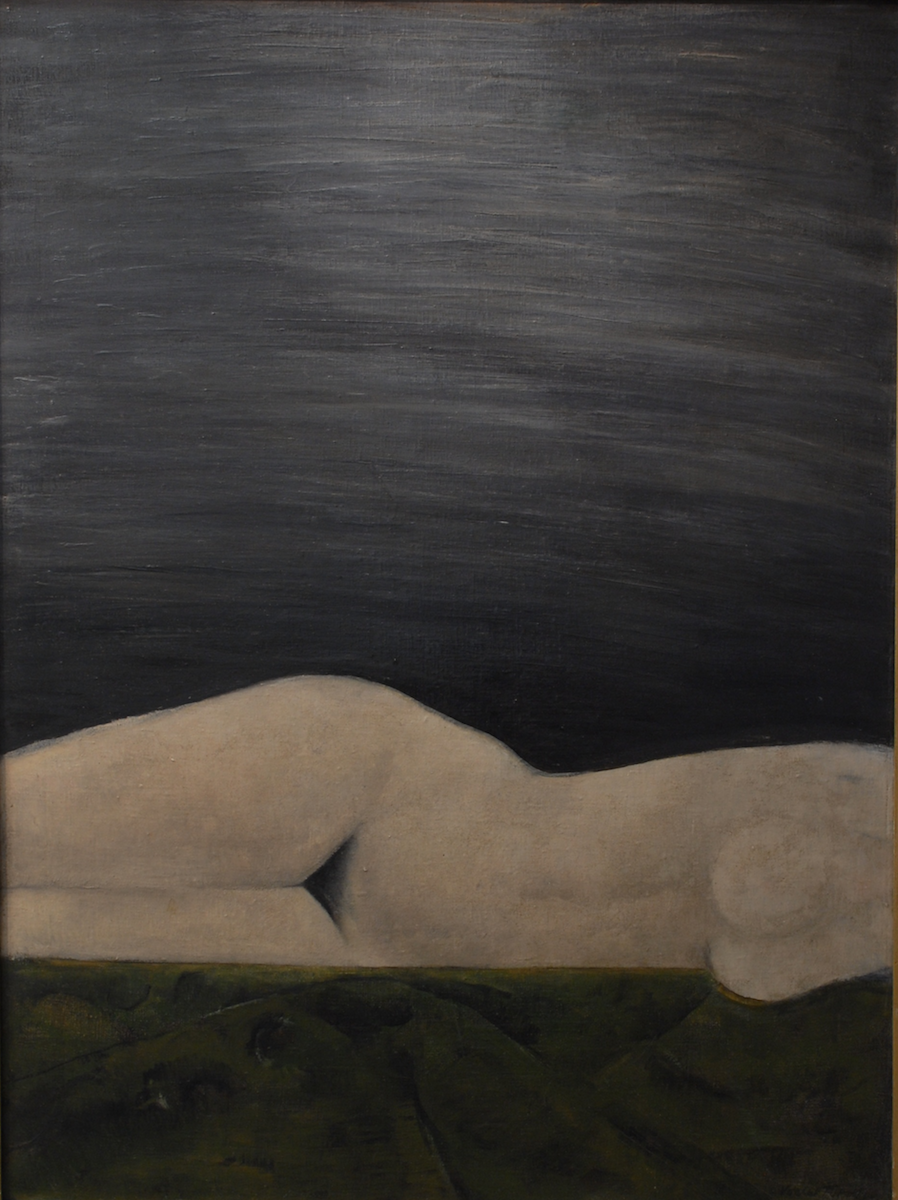

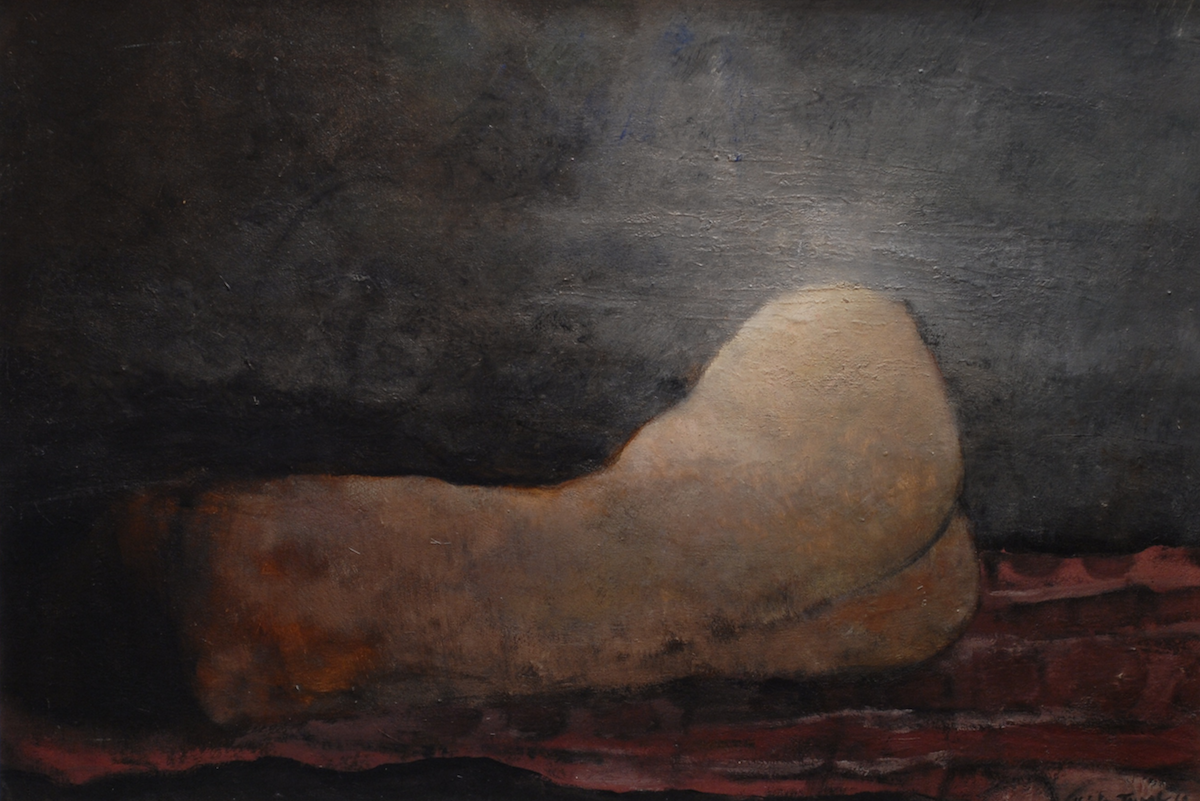

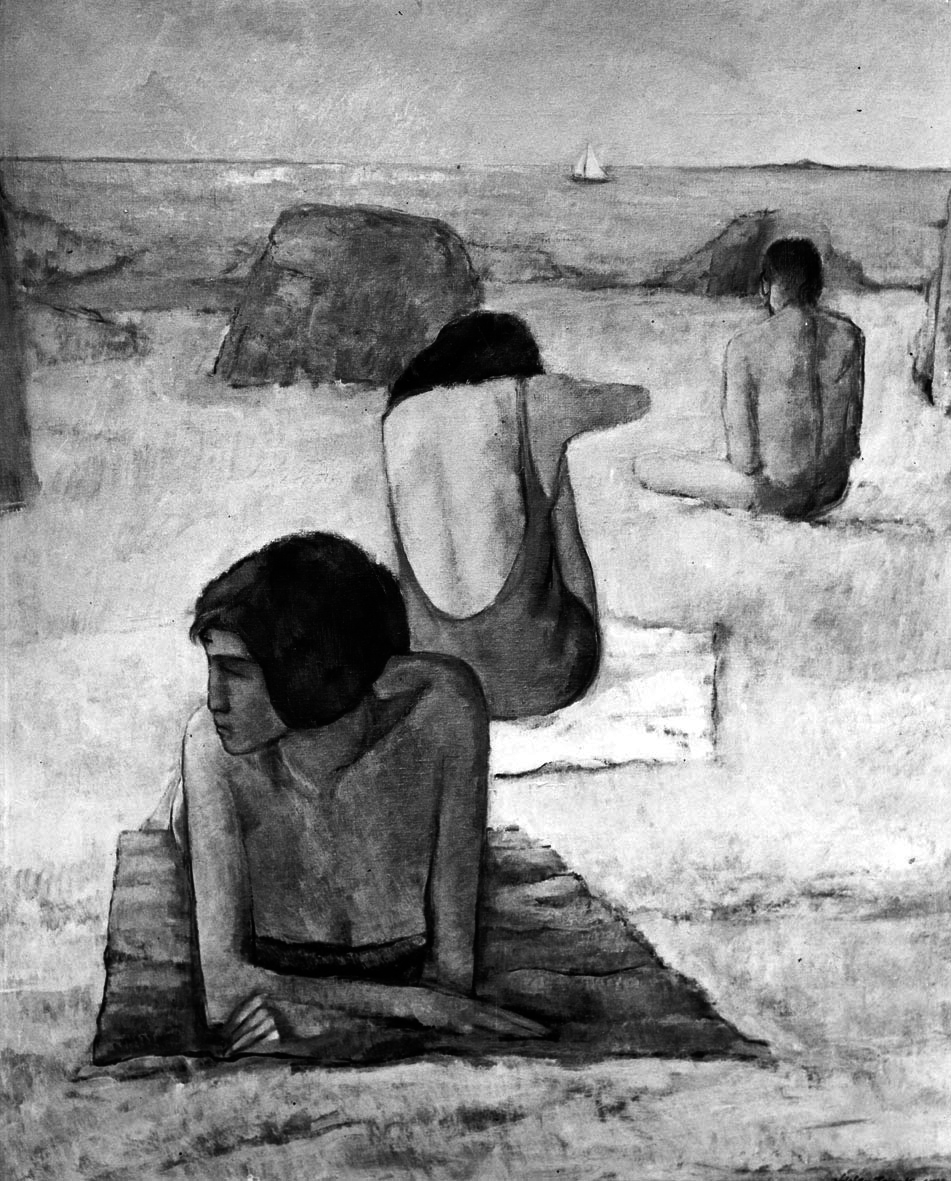

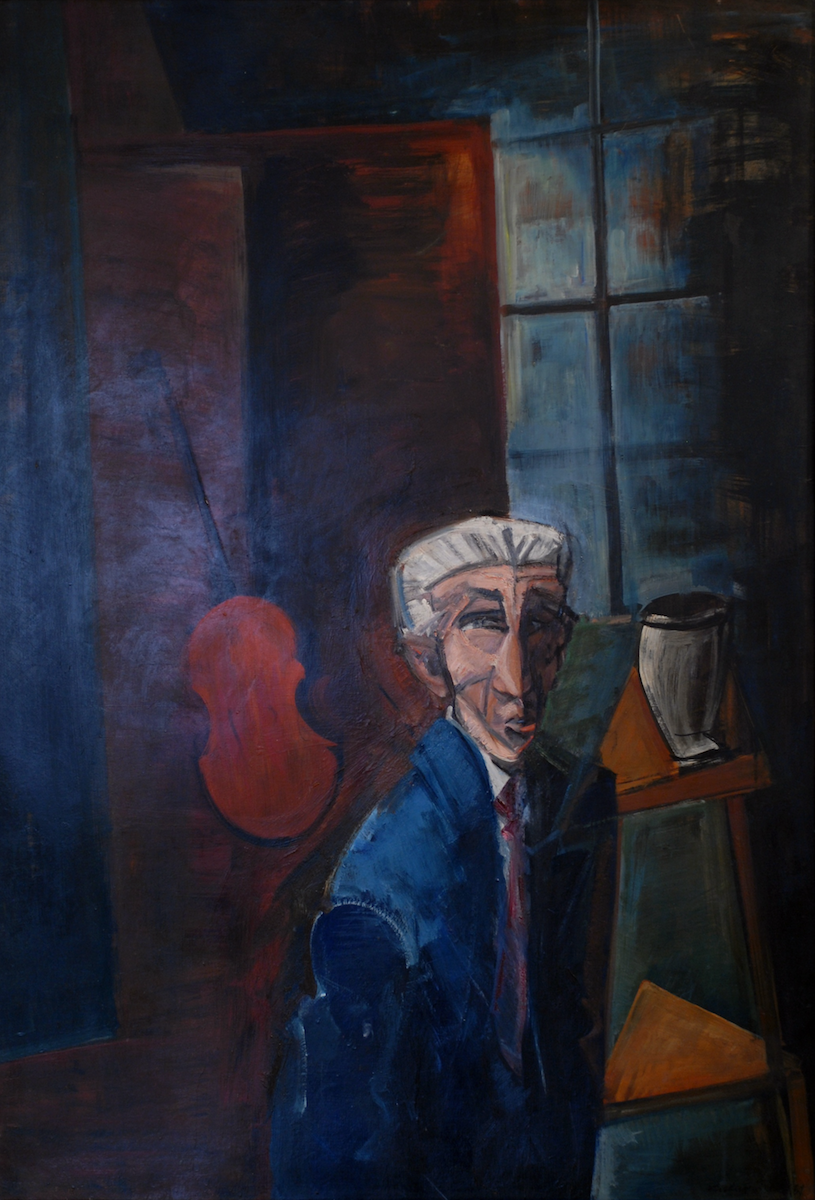

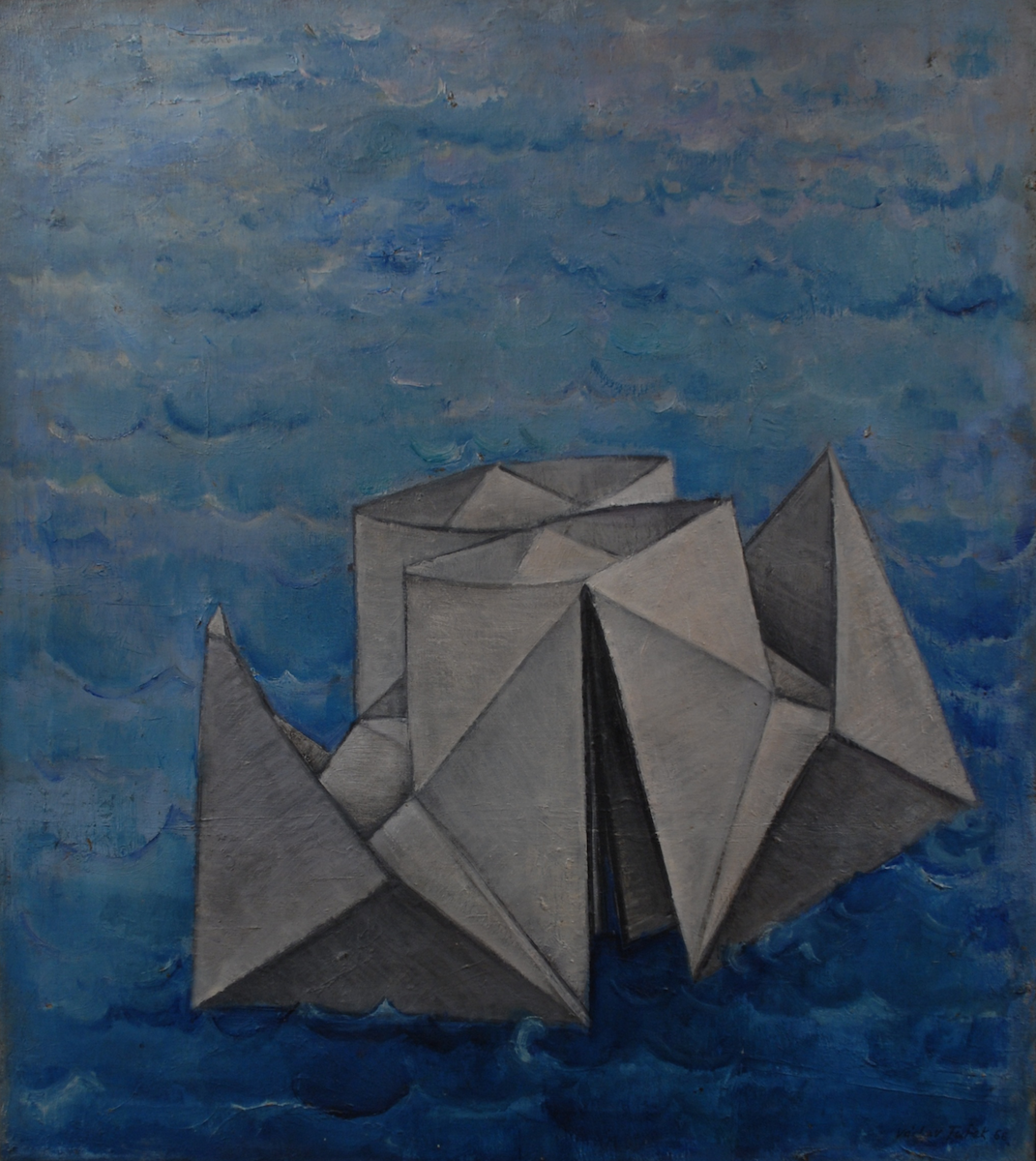

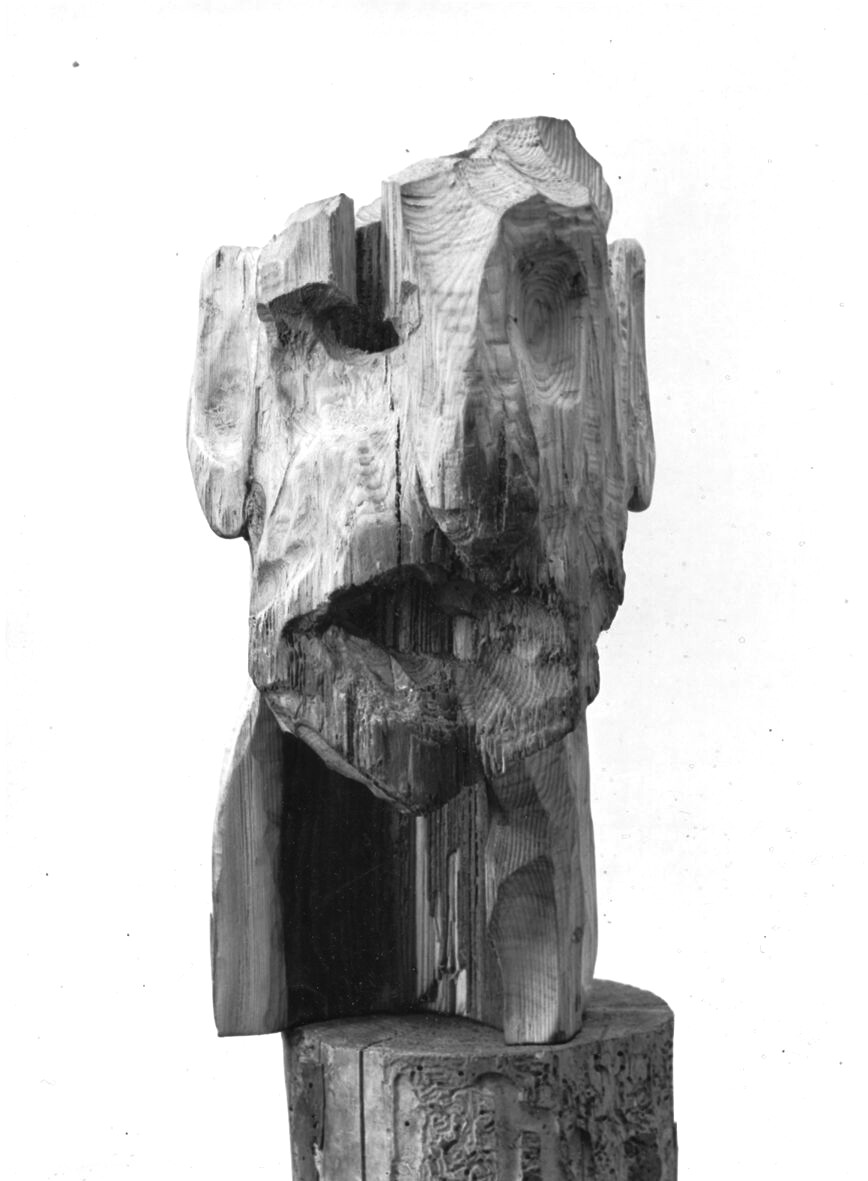

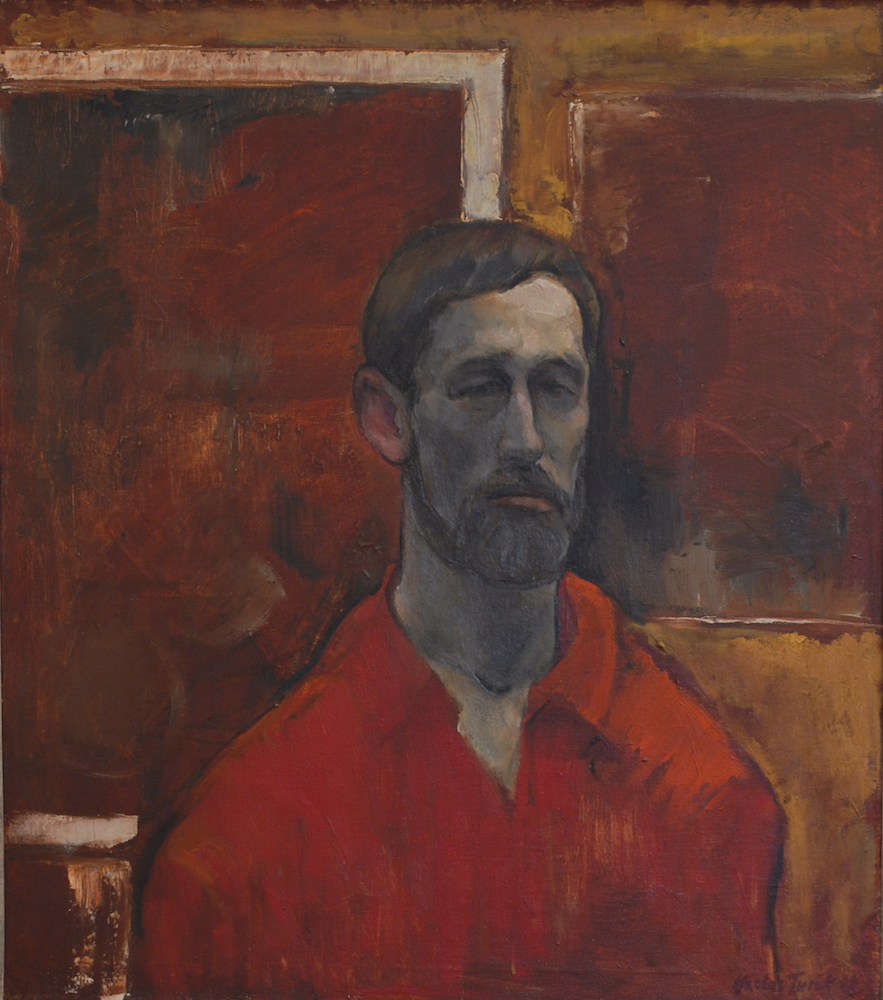

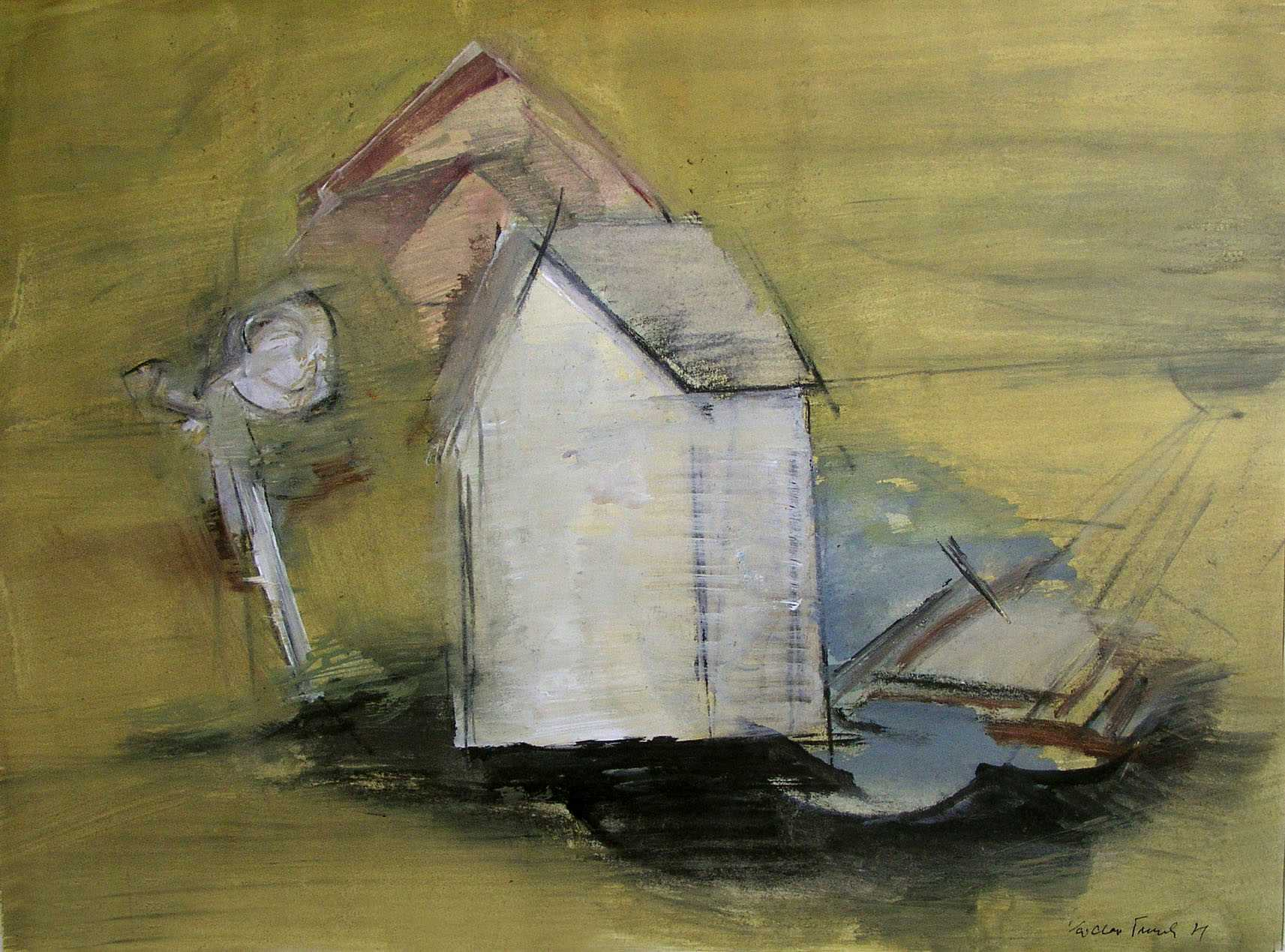

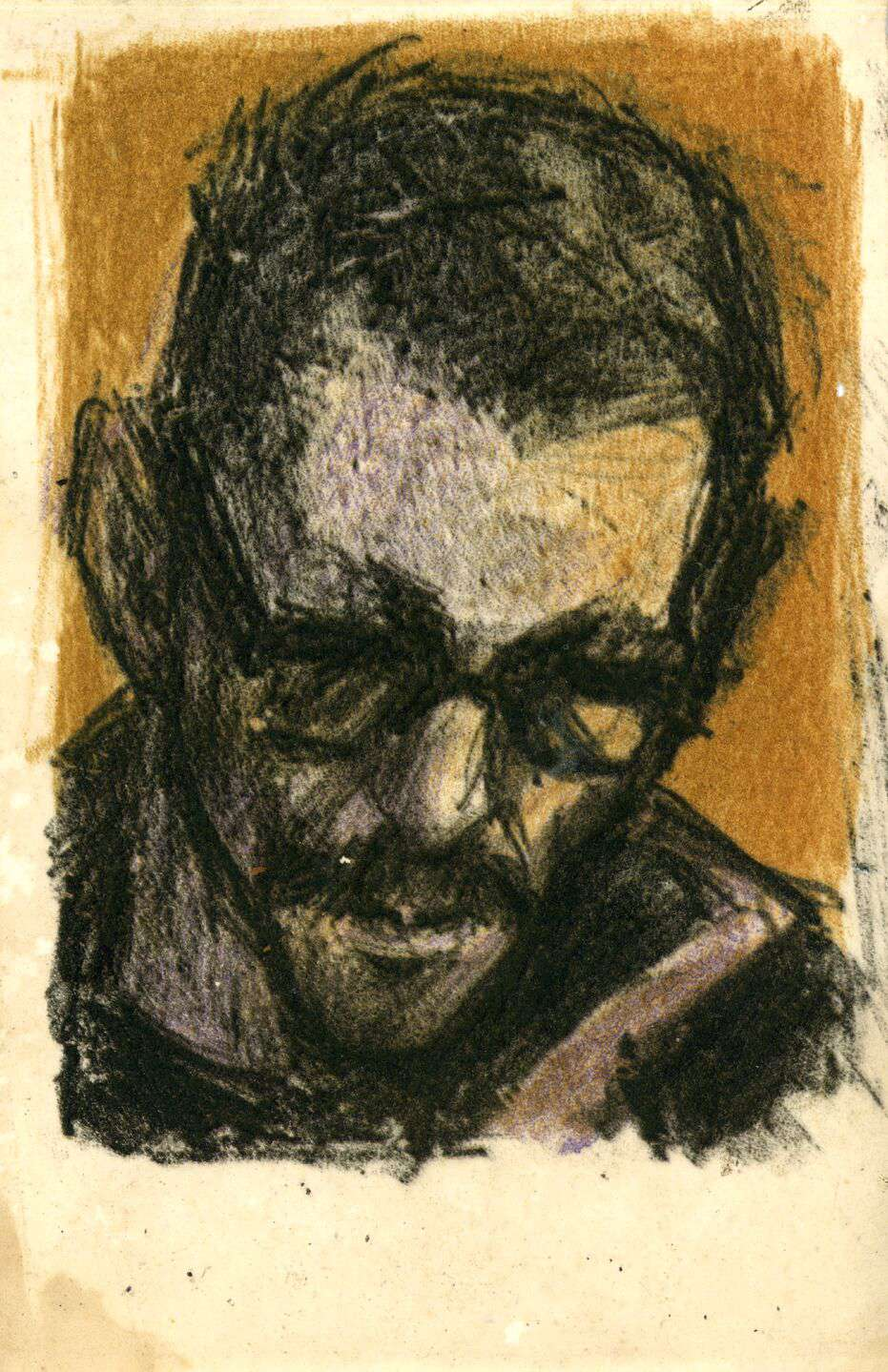

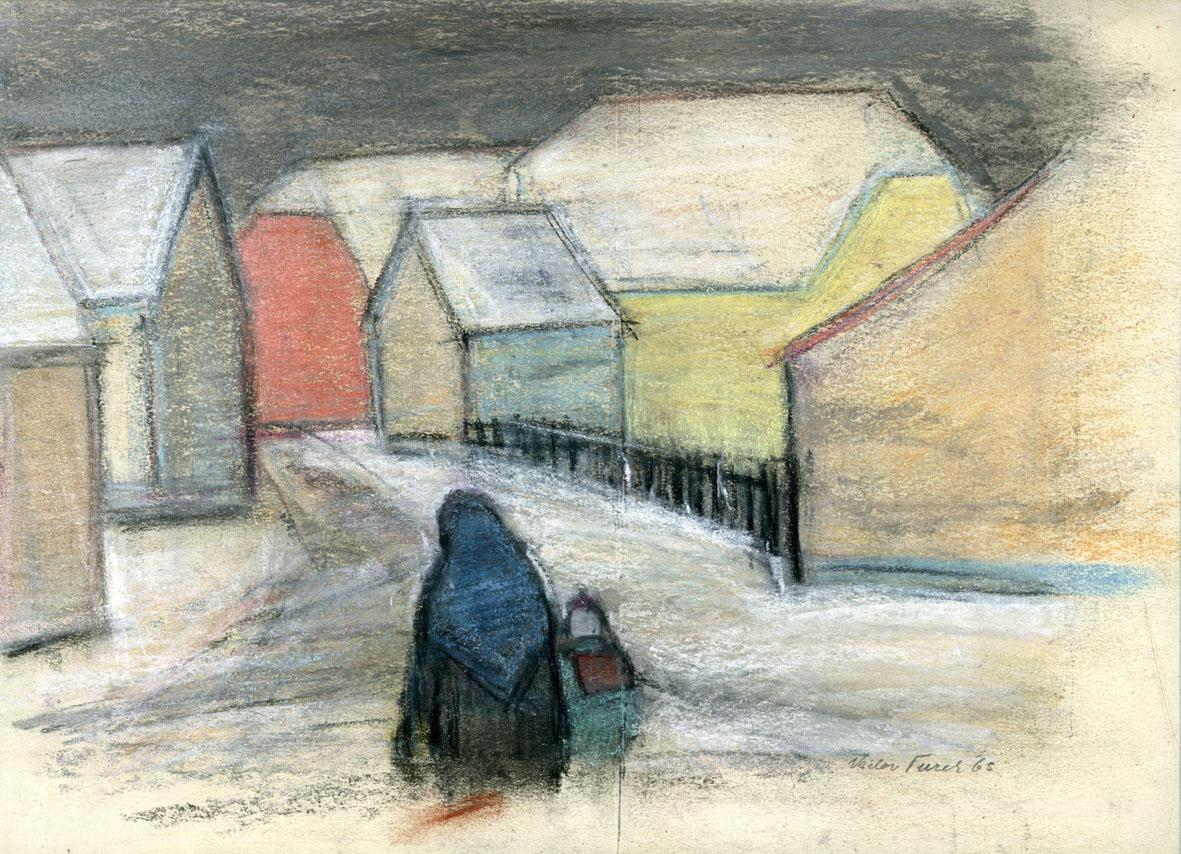

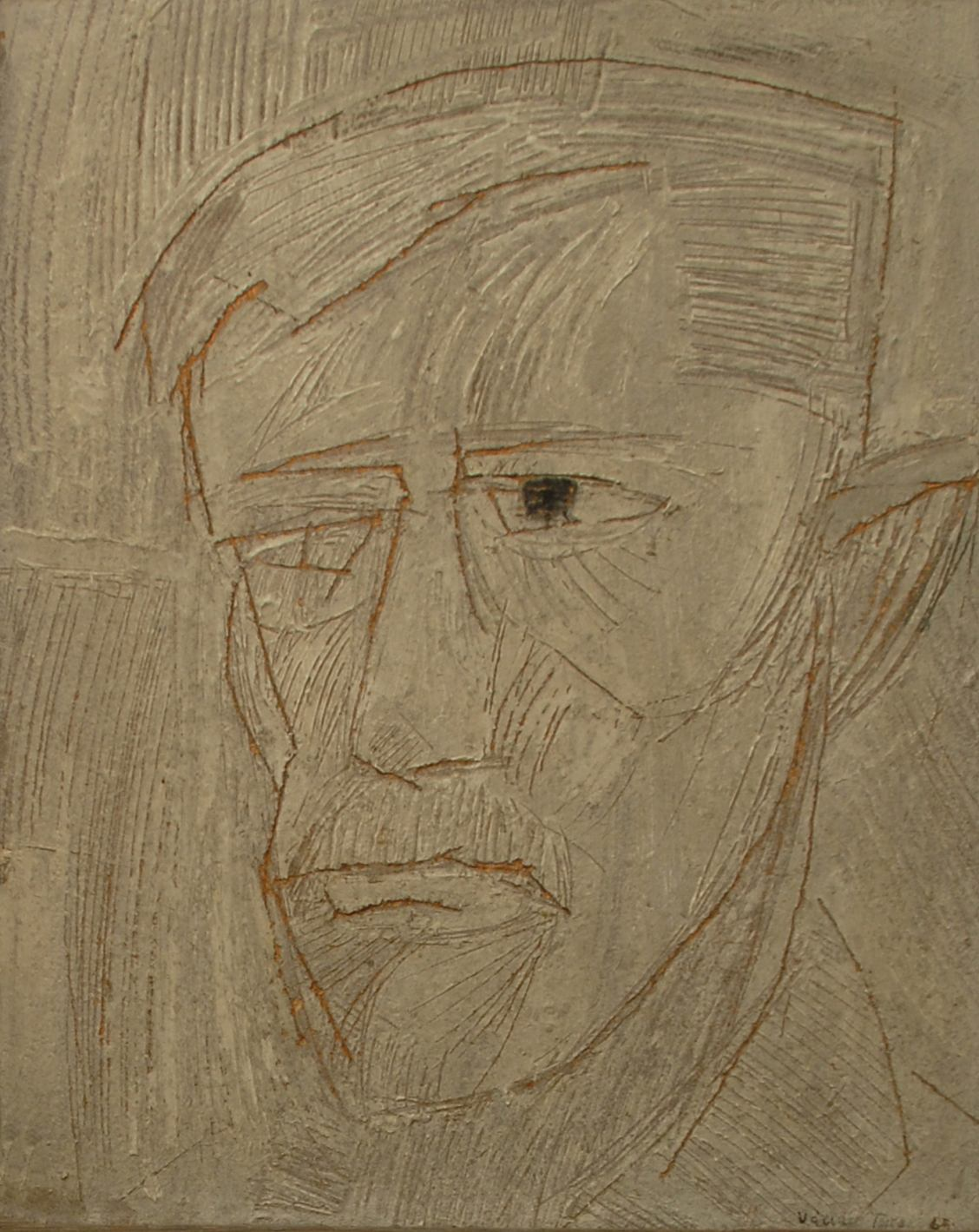

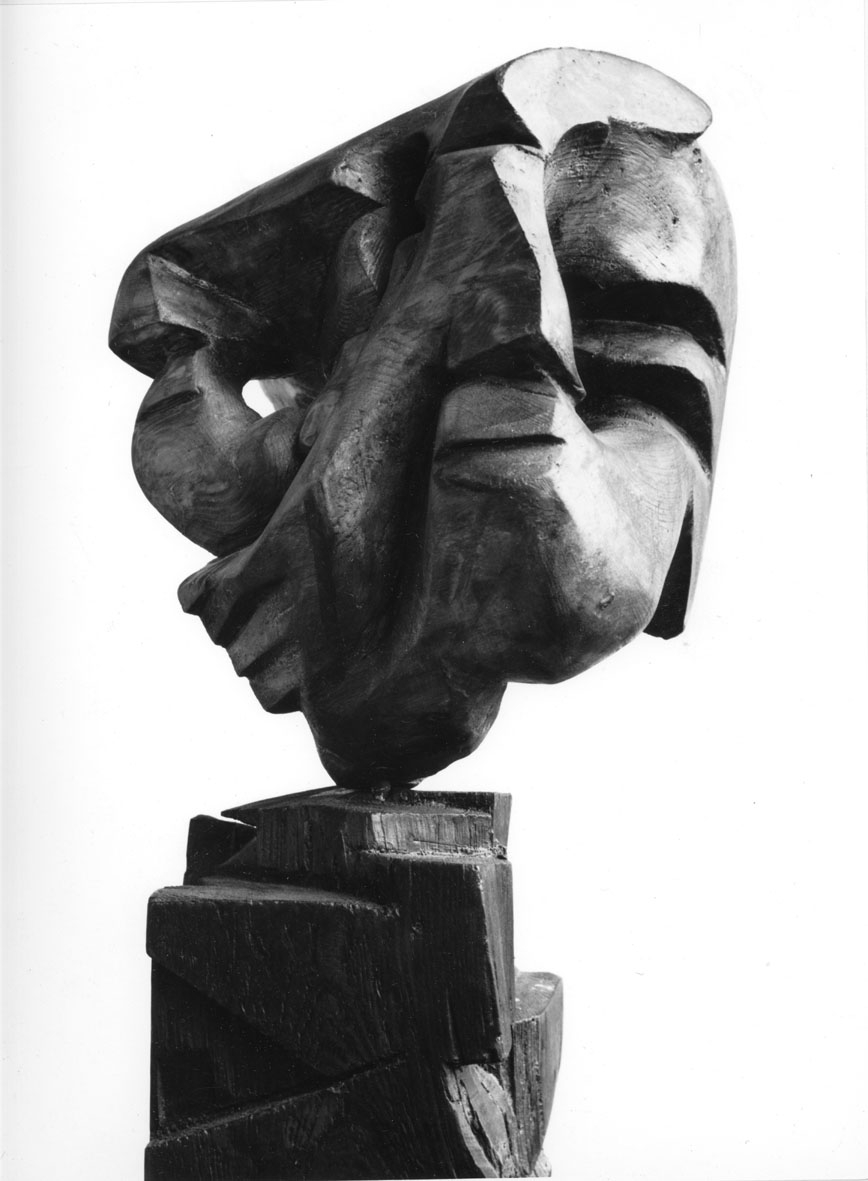

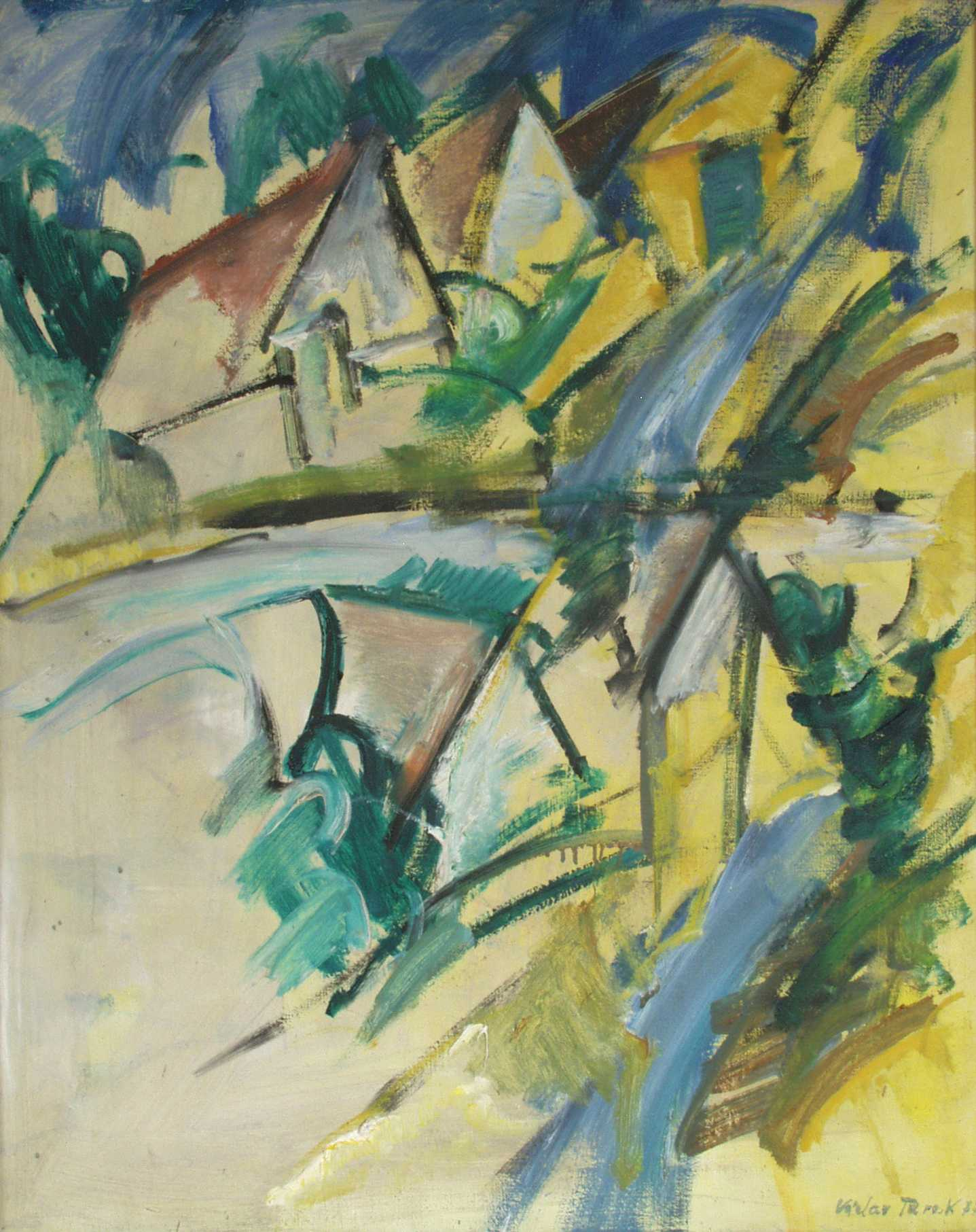
