= Josef Černý (painter) =

Czech painter (born 1943)

Josef Černý (born 1943 in Prague) is a Czech painter. His paintings often have a musical or rural theme. His paintings are in private collections in the Czech Republic and abroad (Germany, France, Sweden, USA, Australia, etc.)

== See also ==
- List of Czech painters
