= Čeněk Dobiáš =

Czech painter

Čeněk Dobiáš (June 1, 1919 – September 28, 1980) was a Czech painter. His paintings have different themes, portraits of Roma girls and women, children, colorful fields of flowers etc. From 1949 he was a member of SVU Ales in Brno (Association of Fine Artists), and from 1955 a member of the Association of Czechoslovak Artists.

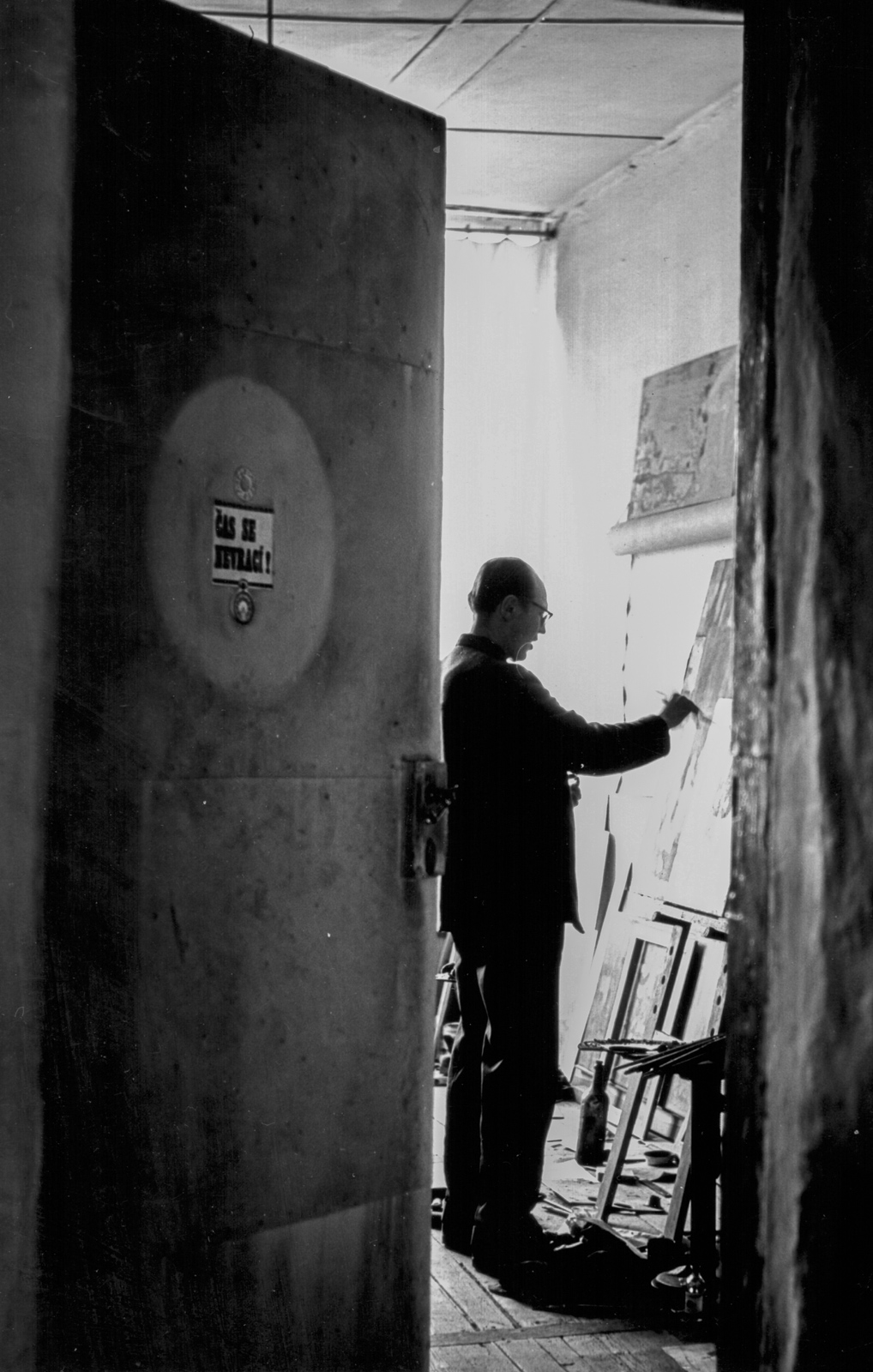
Image of Čeněk Dobiáš, when was painting.

== Literature ==
- Pospíšil, Leopold: S kumštýři za oponou, 1. vyd, Nakladatelství Šimon Ryšavý, Brno 2001, 103 s., 8 s. obr. příl., ISBN 80-86137-42-2
- Rudolfová, Věra: Kraj návratů a setkání : medailonky osobností kulturního života Vysočiny, 1. vyd., Sursum, 2006, 160 s., ISBN 80-7323-135-2

== See also ==
- List of Czech painters
