= Věra Hainzová =

Czech academic and artist (1930–2018)

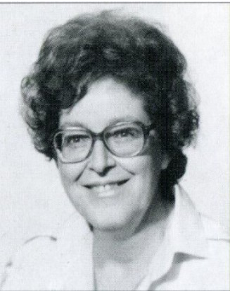
- Born: 24 November 1930; Prague, Czechoslovakia
- Died: 14 July 2018 (aged 87); Prague, Czech Republic
- Resting place: Karlík, old cemetery

Věra Hainzová (née Bruneová; 24 November 1930 – 14 July 2018) was a Czech academic painter and animator of cartoons for children, especially Zdeněk Miler's popular The Mole character.

== Bibliography ==
Věra Hainzová (maiden name Bruneová) was born in Prague on 24 November 1930, and studied at the State School of Graphics in Prague under Professor Zdenek Balaš and Professor Petr Dillinger and at the Academy of Arts, Architecture and Design in Prague under Professor Antonín Kybal, where she successfully graduated in 1956.

Hainzová began her artistic activity at the Centre for Folk Art Creation (ÚLUV, later called Krásná jizba) designing textile patterns. From 1958, she was employed for 44 years at the Bratři v triku cartoon studio, first in Prague in Klárov, later in Barrandov Studios. As an animator, she breathed life into dozens of cartoon characters in hundreds of films – the most famous is certainly the animated series The Mole by Zdeněk Miler, which gained international popularity. There are currently 49 Mole episodes.

Hainzová expanded her rich artistic activity with illustrations of children's books and fairy tales on projected slides, such as Tales of the Old Raven, a Sámi fairy tale published in many language versions by the Artia publishing house, and What the Bunny Had for Dinner, published by Albatros. She also illustrated five classic fairy tales on slides.

However, her largest complete work is a set of 83 watercolors of villas in the town of Dobřichovice, which she painted between 2000 and 2015. In it, she captured the villas of Dobřichovice before World War II, according to her memories from her youth.

== Exhibitions ==
- 1957 – Folk production in Chodsko – Centre for art folk creation (textile)
- 1957 – Exhibition of Czechoslovak Textile – Slavonic Island in Prague
- 1958 – Tablecloths in the Czech Republic pavilion dining room – International exhibition in Brussels
- 1959 – Textile exhibition with L. Těhník and J. Hausner – Young Gallery
- 1959 - Textile exhibition with R. Mejsnar and J. Jelínek – Gallery exhibition hall, Charles Square in Prague
- 1960 – Czechoslovak Artists exhibition – Canada (textile)
- 1963 – Bilance group textile exhibition – the third members' exhibition of "Umělecká Beseda" artists – gallery of the Czech writers (textile)
- 1988 – Exhibition of animated artwork (drawings for films) – Manes in rague
- 1999 – Drawings for cartoons exhibition – hall of dr. Fürst in Dobřichovice
- 2006 – Akvarely Dobřichovice a Brunšov – hall of dr. Fürst in Dobřichovice

== Filmography ==
Animated cartoons

- Vodnická pohádka – 1973
- Krtek a zápalky – 1973
- Krtek a muzika – 1973
- Kocourek Mňouk – 1974
- Krtek hodinářem – 1974
- Krtek fotografem – 1974
- Krtek a vejce – 1974
- Krtek a karneval – 1974
- Dorotka a ježibaba – 1975
- Rumcajsí pohádka o vílině šlojířku (TV film) – 1975
- Dorotka a plamínek – 1976
- O mistra basy – 1976
- Dorotka a hvězda – 1977
- Stavitelé pyramid – 1977
- Dorotka a abeceda – 1977
- Příběhy cvrčka a štěňátka (TV series) – 1978
- O loupežníku Rumcajsovi (TV series) – 1981
- Káťa a Škubánek (TV series) – 1981
- Krtek ve městě – 1982
- Krtek ve snu – 1984
- Velká sýrová loupež – 1986
- Mikrob – 1986
- Krtek a medicina – 1987
- Krtek filmová hvězda – 1988
- Svatba prasátek – 1989
- Krtek a orel – 1992
- Sylvester and the Magic Pebble – 1992
- Pozor, bonbón (TV series)
- Goldilocks and the Three Bears – 1993
- Krtek a hodiny – 1994
- Krtek a weekend – 1994
- Krtek a robot – 1994
- Krtek a kamarádi – 1994
- Krtek a kachničky – 1995
- Krtek a myška – 1995
- Krtek a metro – 1997
- Krtek a maminka – 1997
- Krtek a houby – 1997
- Já Baryk (TV series) – 1998
- Krtek a pramen – 1999
- Krtek a šťoura – 1999

== Bibliography ==
=== Illustrations ===
- Tales of the Old Raven, a Sámi fairy tale published by Artia
- What the Bunny Had for Dinner, published by Albatros

== Fairy tales on projected slides ==
- Wild Swans, Hans Christian Andersen
- Boil, pot!, Karel Jaromír Erben
- The Little Marmaid, Hans Christian Andersen
- Water Lady, Božena Němcová
- The Firebird and the Ryška Fox, Karel Jaromír Erben

== Watercolors of Dobřichovice villas ==
- Vila JUDr. Eduarda Krütznera (Bella Vista), 38x38cm, nečíslováno, 2000
- Vila JUDr. Eduarda Krütznera (Bella Vista), 38x38cm, nečíslováno, 2000
- Vila JUDr. Eduarda Krütznera (Bella Vista), 38x38cm, nečíslováno, 2000
- Sál MUDr. Fürsta, 52x55cm, č. obrazu 1, 2007
- Immatriculata, 52x70cm, č. obrazu 2, 2007
- Vila rytíře JUDr. Antonína Randy, 52x55cm, č. obrazu 3a, 2006
- Vila rytíře JUDr. Antonína Randy, 52x55cm, č. obrazu 3b, 2006
- Vila F. X. Šaldy, 52x55cm, č. obrazu 4, 2002
- Fixova vila, 52x55cm, č. obrazu 5, chybí rok
- Vila JUDr. Josefa Herolda, 52x55cm, č. obrazu 6a, 2004
- Vila JUDr. Josefa Herolda, 52x55cm, č. obrazu 6b, 2004
- Vila JUDr. Josefa Herolda, 52x55cm, č. obrazu 6c, 2007
- Vaňkova vila, 52x55cm, č. obrazu 7, 2007
- Vila JUDr. Miroslava Krajníka, 52x55cm, č. obrazu 8a, 2004
- Vila JUDr. Miroslava Krajníka, 52x55cm, č. obrazu 8b, 2004
- Vila Františka Topiče, 52x55cm, č. obrazu 9a, 2004
- Vila Františka Topiče, 52x55cm, č. obrazu 9b, 2004
- Vila Františka Procházky (Luisa), 52x55cm, č. obrazu 10a, 2002
- Vila Františka Procházky (Luisa), 52x55cm, č. obrazu 10b, chybí rok
- Vila Františka Procházky (Luisa), 52x55cm, č. obrazu 10c, chybí rok
- Vila Františka Procházky (Luisa), 52x55cm, č. obrazu 10d, 2001
- Vila Luisy Matesové, 52x55cm, č. obrazu 11a, 2004
- Vila Luisy Matesové, 52x55cm, č. obrazu 11b, 2014
- Dobřichovický most, 52x55cm, č. obrazu 12, 2004
- Hlávkova vila, 52x55 cm, č. obrazu 13, 2005
- Vila Bohumila Staňka, 52x55cm, č. obrazu 14, 2001
- Vila MUDr. Jaroslava Franty, 52x55cm, č. obrazu 15a, 2001
- Vila MUDr. Jaroslava Franty, 52x55cm, č. obrazu 15b, 2001
- Josífkova vila, 52x55cm, č. obrazu 16, 2004
- Hainzova vila od vjezdu, 52x55cm, č. obrazu 17a, 2002
- Hainzova vila od západu, 52x55cm, č. obrazu 17b, 2002
- Hainzova vila od jihu, 52x55cm, č. obrazu 17c, 2004
- Hainzova vila od ulice, 52x55cm, č. obrazu 17d, 2006
- Hainzova vila v zimě, 52x55cm, č. obrazu 17e, 2006
- Vila Čeňka Machovského, 52x55cm, č. obraz 18a, 2006
- Vila Čeňka Machovského, 52x55cm, č obrazu 18b, 2006
- Vila Františka Josefa Materny, 52x55cm, č. obrazu 19a, 2004
- Vila Františka Josefa Materny, 52x55cm, č. obrazu 19b, 2004
- Vila architekta Františka Buldry, 52x55cm, č. obrazu 20, 2006
- Vila Jana Štěpánka, 52x55cm, č. obrazu 21, 2004
- Vila JUDr. Eduarda Krütznera na jaře (Bella Vista), 52x55cm, č. obrazu 22a, 2001
- Vila JUDr. Eduarda Krütznera na podzim (Bella Vista), 52x55cm, č. obrazu 22b, 2001
- Vila JUDr. Eduarda Krütznera v létě (Bella Vista), 52x55cm, č. obrazu 22c, 2001
- Vila JUDr. Krütznera v zimě (Bella Vista), 52x55cm, č. obrazu 22d, 2006
- Vila JUDr. Krütznera (Bella Vista), 52x55cm, č. obrazu 22e, 2011
- Posezení na zahradě vily čp. 140, 52x55cm, č. obrazu 22f, 2011
- Roikova vila, 52x55cm, č. obrazu 23a, 2005
- Roikova vila, 52x55cm, č. obrazu 23b, 2005
- Šimkova vila, 52x55cm, č. obrazu 24, 2001
- Sudova vila, 52x55cm, č. obrazu 25, 2001
- Fleissigova vila v zimě, 52x55cm, č. obrazu 26, 2001
- Růžkova vila, 52x55cm, č. obrazu 27, 2002
- Bílý letohrádek ve Všenorech, 48x48 cm, č. obrazu 28, 2011
- Dobřichovický zámek – dvůr fary, 52x55cm, č. obrazu 29, 2002
- Dobřichovický zámek, 52x55cm, č. obrazu 30, 2002
- Dobřichovický most, 52x55cm, č. obrazu 31, 2002
- Dobřichovický most, 52x55cm, č. obrazu 32, 2002
- Socha sv. Jana Nepomuckého u zámku, 52x55cm, č. obrazu 33, 2001
- Zámecká kaple sv. Judy Tadeáše, 52x55cm, č. obrazu 34, 2001
- Mýtné u mostu, 52x55cm, č. obrazu 35, 2001
- Dobřichovický zámek pod sněhem, 52x55cm, č. obrazu 36, 2002
- Dobřichovický zámek - náměstí, 52x55cm, č. obrazu 37, 2002
- Dobřichovický zámek - nádvoří, 52x55cm, č. obrazu 38, 2002
- Restaurace U nádraží (původně hotel Šebesta), 52x55cm, č. obrazu 39, 2004
- Brichtova vila, 52x55cm, č. obrazu 40, 2004
- Vila Pellé, 52x55cm, č. obrazu 41a, 2004
- Vila Pellé, 52x55cm, č. obrazu 41b, 2004
- Vila Pellé, 52x55cm, č. obrazu 41c, 2002
- Vila JUDr. Antonína Doskočila, 52x55cm, č. obrazu 42a, 2001
- Vila JUDr. Antonína Doskočila, 52x55cm, č. obrazu 42b, 2001
- Penzion Stejskal, 62x65cm, č. obrazu 43, 2004
- Dobřichovické nádraží, 47x66cm, č. obrazu 44, 2001
- Náměstí u zámku, 52x70cm, č. obrazu 45, 2002
- Dobřichovický zámek a fara, 51x70cm, č. obrazu 46, 2002
- Moser-Baumgartnerova vila, 52x55cm, č. obrazu 47, 2004
- Vila Václava Klenky, 52x55cm, č. obrazu 48, 2007
- Vila Václava Klenky, 52x55cm, č. obrazu 49, 2007
- Posezení na zahradě Františka Topiče, 52x55cm, č. obrazu 50, 2007
- Posezení Na platišti, 43x68cm, č. obrazu 51, 2012
- Mládkova vila, 52x55cm, č. obrazu 52, 2014
- Vila JUDr. Josefa Háčka, 52x55cm, č. obrazu 53, 2015
- Vila Aloise Bureše, 52x55cm, č. obrazu 54, 2015
- Moje skalka, 52x55cm, č. obrazu 55, 2015

The paintings are not numbered in ascending order according to the time when Věra Hainzová-Bruneová painted them. They were subsequently numbered at once when the "Dobřichovice and Brunšov Watercolors exhibition" was organized in 2006, according to thematic grouping – for example, all the paintings of Procháska's Villa Luisa were grouped under the numbers 10a, 10b, 10c and 10d, even though they were painted successively in different years.
