= Jindřich Eckert =

Czech photographer (1833–1905)

Jindřich Eckert (22 April 1833, in Prague – 28 February 1905, in Prague) was a Czech photographer, best remembered for his collotypes depicting allegorical Tableaux vivants. A graduate of the Czech Technical University in Prague, his photographs of the Bohemian Forest and the Giant Mountains have been displayed at Clam-Gallas Palace.

== Gallery ==
Malá Strana and Hradčany from the roof of the National Theatre

Footbridge over the Lužnice in Bechyně

Slum clearance near St. Gall's Church, Prague

Old castle in Vlašim
