= František Sequens =

Czech painter

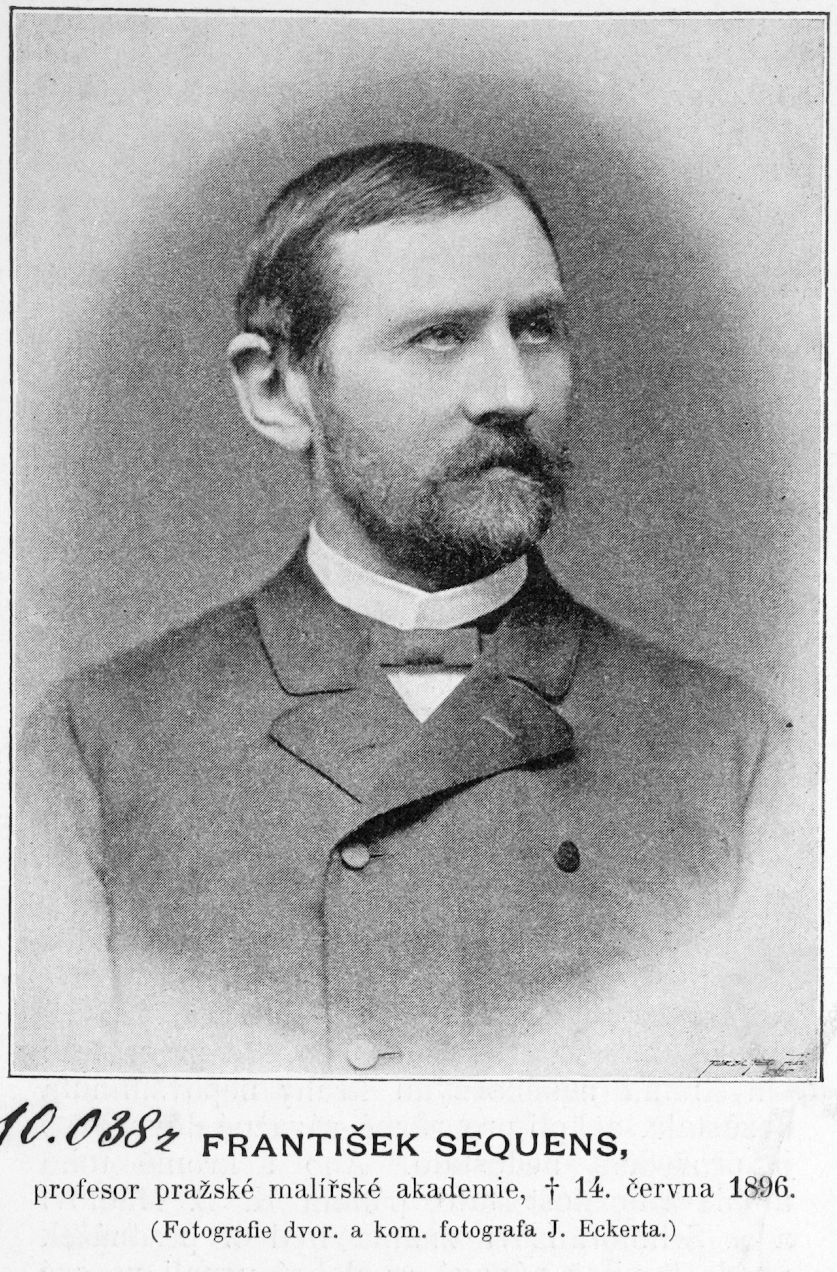
František Sequens (1896); by Jindřich Eckert

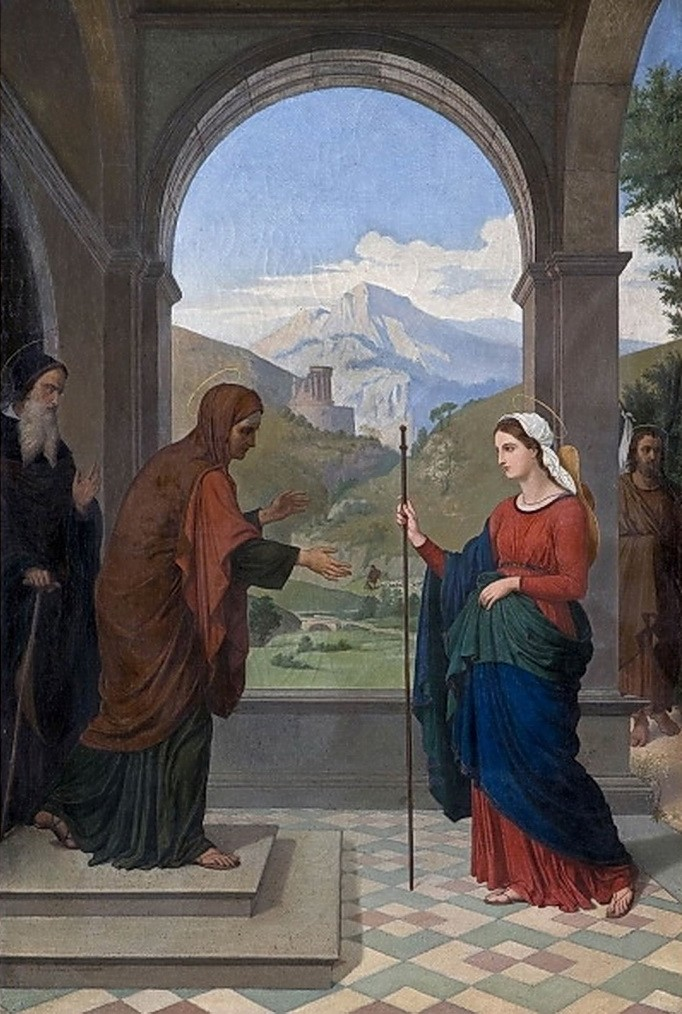
The Visitation

František Seraf Sequens (German: Franz Sequens; 21 November 1836 – 14 June 1896) was a Czech church and history painter.

== Biography ==
Sequens was born on 21 November 1836 in Plzeň. After completing his primary education at the Realschule in Prague, he became a student at the Academy of Fine Arts. The following year (1854), he transferred to the Academy of Fine Arts, Munich, where he studied with Wilhelm Kaulbach. Later, he attended the Royal Academy of Fine Arts in Antwerp. His principal instructor there was Joseph van Lerius.

In 1860, he returned briefly to Prague. He then spent seven years in Rome; by courtesy of a scholarship. He initially created history paintings, but eventually became associated with the Nazarene movement and devoted himself entirely to religious works. Many of his portraits of saints were stylized after Early Roman and Byzantine models.

He returned to Plzeň in 1868, where he married the daughter of a local pianist, Josef Gerlach. They settled in Prague and he developed a working relationship with the architect, Josef Mocker.

In 1880, he succeeded Jan Swerts as Professor of Religious and History Painting at the Prague Academy. He also served as Rector there for the years 1882 to 1883, 1884 to 1885, 1886 to 1887 and 1890 to 1893. His lectures were very popular. Of his ninety-eight students, the best known include Luděk Marold, František Kupka, Viktor Oliva, Josef Rolletschek and Maxmilián Pirner.

After 1875, he was a member of the Christian Academy and headed the art department there. He was also an active member of the committee for planning the renovation of St. Vitus Cathedral. From 1880, he sat on the supervisory commission for the City of Prague Museum. He was elected a member of the Czech Academy of Sciences and Arts in 1890.

Sequens died on 14 June 1896 in Prague, at the age of 59.

== Sources ==
- Biography @ the Biographisches Lexikon des Kaiserthums Oesterreich (in fraktur)
- Zlata Praha 1895/96, Vol. 12, pg. 381.
- Svetozor 1895/96, Vol. 33, pg. 395.
- Humoristicke listy 29, 1887, Vol. 14, pg. 112.
- "Sequens, Franz (František)". In: Österreichisches Biographisches Lexikon 1815–1950 (ÖBL). Vol. 12, Austrian Academy of Sciences, Vienna 2005, ISBN 3-7001-3580-7, p. 182 f. (Direct links to "p. 182", "p. 183")
