= Jaroslav Černý (painter) =

Czech painter (1904–1984)

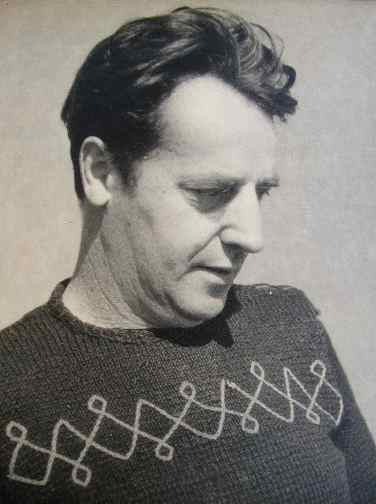
Jaroslav Černý

Jaroslav Černý (1 June 1904–26 March 1984) was a Czech painter. Jaroslav Cerny descended from a poor working-class family. His artistic talent and creativity became evident in primary school when he first exhibited his artwork. In his artistic development he was very involved with František Kupka. His works generally entailed the Czech countryside. He successfully exhibited his paintings in exhibitions at home, in Europe, and even in South America. Černý's works can be viewed at the City Gallery of Prague, government buildings including embassies, and in private collections in Europe and abroad.

== Literature ==
- TOMAN, Prokop. Nový slovník československých výtvarných umělců. 3. vyd. Svazek 1. Praha : Rudolf Ryšavý, 1947. Heslo Černý, Jaroslav, s. 146.
- BLAŽENÍN, Pavel. Vzpomínka na akademického malíře Jaroslava Černého. Informační listy Černošice, květen 2004, čís. 5, s. 27–28. [www.mestocernosice.cz/informacni-listy Dostupné online].
- Výstava z díla akademického malíře Jaroslava Černého u příležitosti nedožitých 85. narozenin 10.-12. listopadu 1989. Černošice : Kulturní dům, Černošice III Vráž, 1989.

== See also ==
- List of Czech painters
