= Jaro Procházka =

Czech painter (1886–1949)

- Born: 22 April 1886; Prague, Bohemia, Austria-Hungary
- Died: 30 September 1949 (aged 63); Prague, Czechoslovakia
- Education: Academy of Fine Arts, Prague
- Known for: Painting, printmaking
- Notable work: View of Prague & Kampa in Winter
- Movement: Influenced by Impressionism

Jaro Procházka (22 April 1886 – 30 September 1949) was a Czech painter specializing in cities and landscapes.

== Life ==
Procházka was born on 22 April 1886 in Prague. He studied at the Academy of Fine Arts, Prague under Prof. Jakesch (1900–1904), and then at the Academy of Fine Arts, where his studies were interrupted by the First World War. He was a member of the Union of Artists in Prague.

His work was influenced by the impressionist movement. During his lifetime he made study trips to Paris, Belgium, and the Netherlands. Paintings of Bruges and the Belgian countryside can be considered the pinnacle of his work. A set of paintings of European cities in 1931 was awarded the annual prize of the Academy of Sciences.

He exhibited his works in many solo and joint exhibitions in Czechoslovakia and abroad, such as Paris, Oslo and Copenhagen.

Procházka died on 30 September 1949 in Prague.

== Selected works ==
- "View Of Prague", signed Iaro Prochazka (lower right) oil on canvas exhibited in Prague in 1936 with the group "Jednota".
- "Kampa In Winter", oil on cardboard, 48 x 70 cm, framed, glazed, undated, signed lower right.
- "Early Morning in Bruges"
- "Spring Celebration", five naked children dancing in the blossoming spring orchard. Oil on canvas, 114 x 79 cm, bottom left side signed "J. Procházka".
- "Krakow", view into historical town center. Oil on plywood, 40 x 28 cm, bottom right corner signed "J. Procházka".
- "Evening landscape with the lake", view of the lake surrounded by trees with the setting Sun on the background and three little figures in front. Oil on a board, 23,5x33,5 cm (inside frame measurements), bottom right signed "Jaro Procházka". framed, glassed. Condition A.
- "A Prague Corner", signed Jaro Procházka bottom right, oil/canvas, 50 x 65 cm, framed.
- "On the stairs", oil on cardboard, 50 x 65 cm, framed, glazed, undated, signed lower right.
- "Časně Ráno V Bruggách"
- "A View Of The Lesser Quarter"
- "The Market In Kampa"
- "Im Waldesinneren"
