= Luma von Flesch-Brunningen =

Czech artist (1856–1934)

- Born: 31 March 1856; Brno, Moravia, Austrian Empire
- Died: 1934 (aged 77–78); Munich, Nazi Germany
- Other name: Luma Flesch-Brunningen-von Csúsy
- Known for: Painting

Ludmilla "Luma" von Flesch-Brunningen (31 March 1856 – 1934) was a Czech painter.

== Biography ==
Flesch-Brunningen was born on 31 March 1856 in Brno, Moravia, Austrian Empire. She studied in Vienna, Austria and Munich, Germany. She exhibited her work at the 1900 Paris Exposition. Flesch-Brunningen died in 1934 in Munich.

== Gallery ==
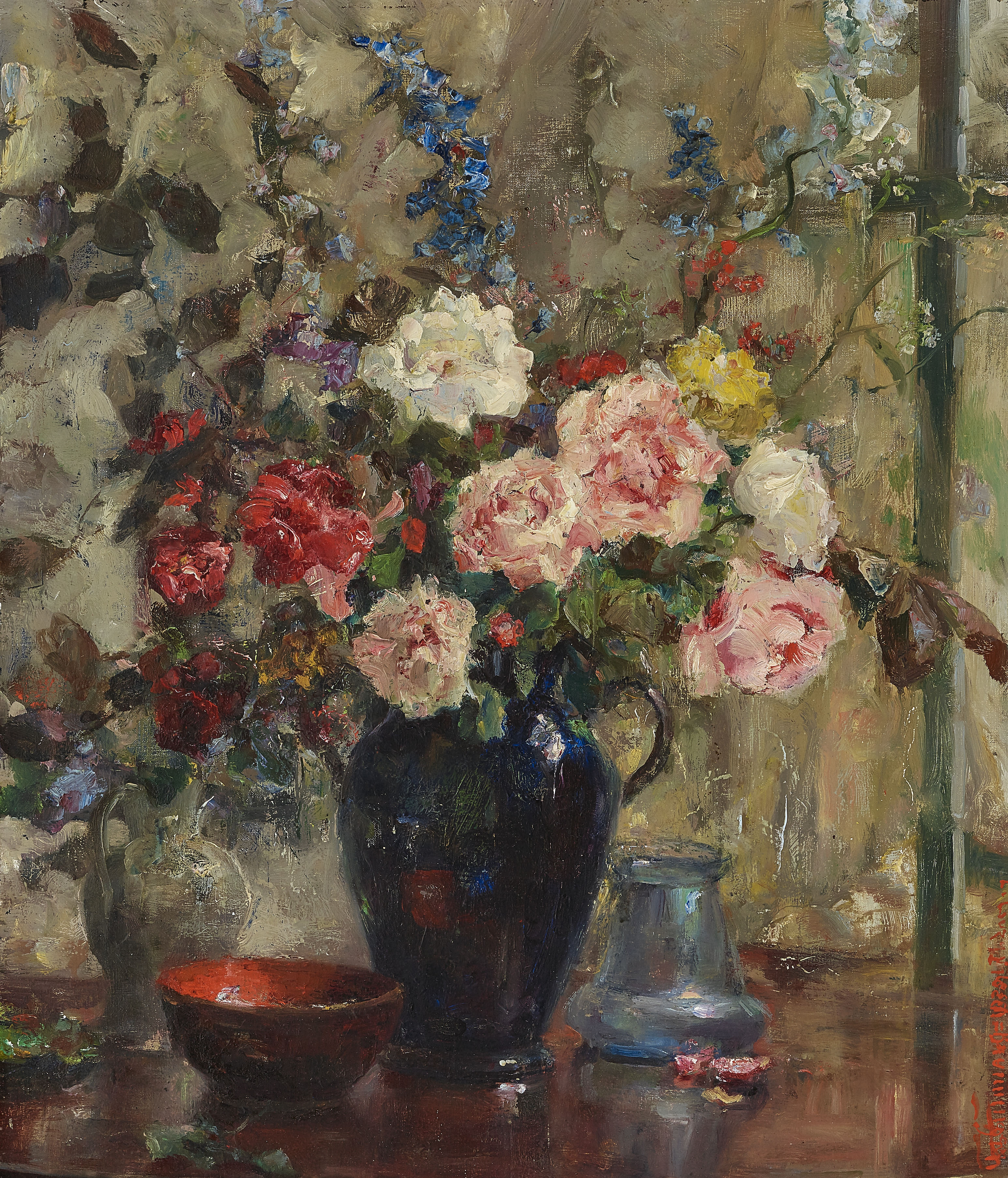
Still life with flowers

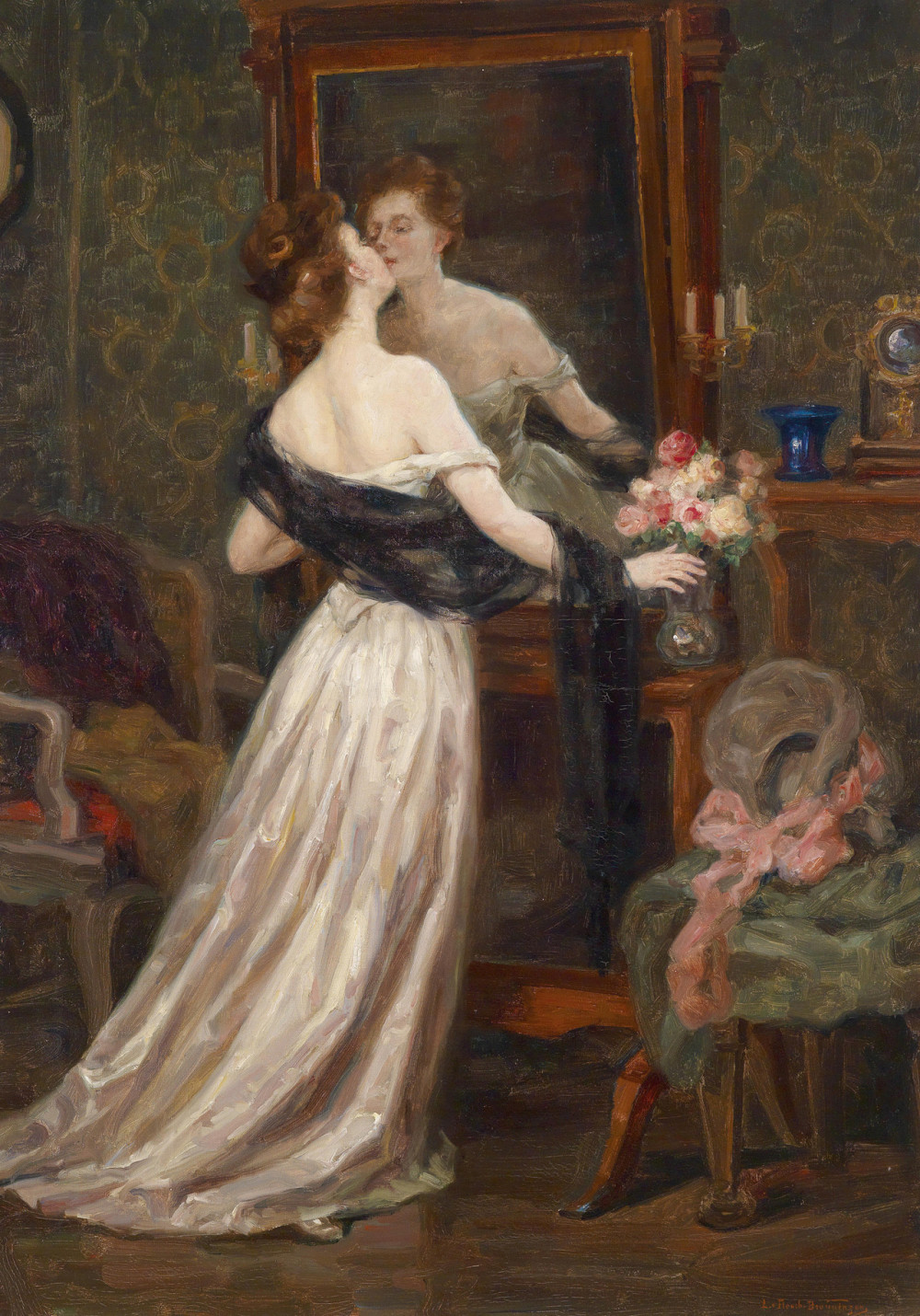
Lady in the boudoir in front of the mirror

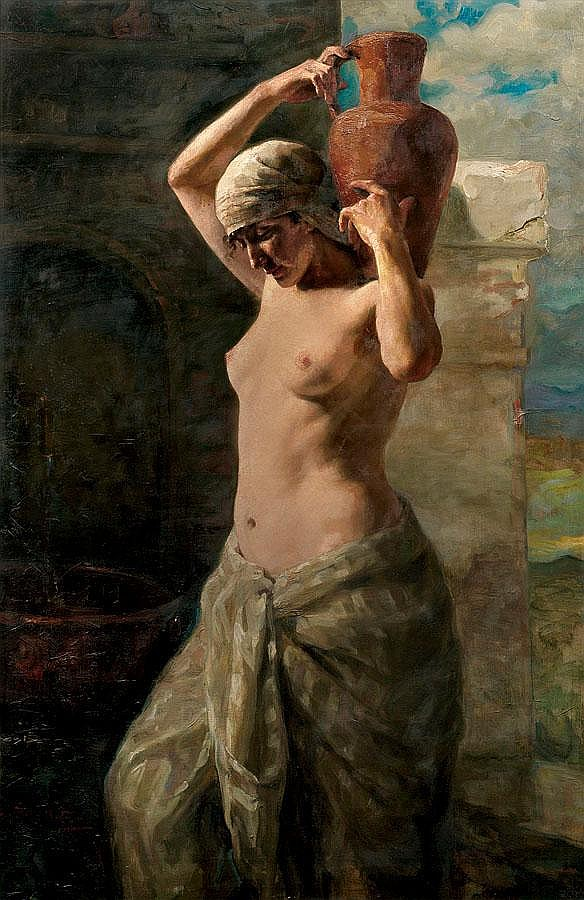
Greek water carrier
