= Václav Junek =

Czech businessman (born 1951)

- Born: 17 June 1951 (age 75)
- Occupation: Businessman
- Known for: Purchase of Václav Havel's stake in Lucerna Palace
- Title: Chairman of Chemapol Group

Václav Junek (born 17 June 1951) is a Czech businessman.

Junek was a chairman of bankrupt conglomerate Chemapol Group.

Junek's company Chemapol Reality (C.H.R.) purchased from Václav Havel his 50 percent stake in a legendary dance-hall Lucerna Palace on Wenceslas Square for CZK 200 mio. It sold it two years later to Dagmar Havlová for CZK 145 mio. Later, the company went bankrupt.

In 1999, Junek publicly admitted Chemapol bribed the politicians of Czech Social Democratic Party (ČSSD). The ruling ČSSD politicians secretly used gas cards issued to the name of Chemapol to get gas for free.
