= Vlastimil Rada =

Czech painter

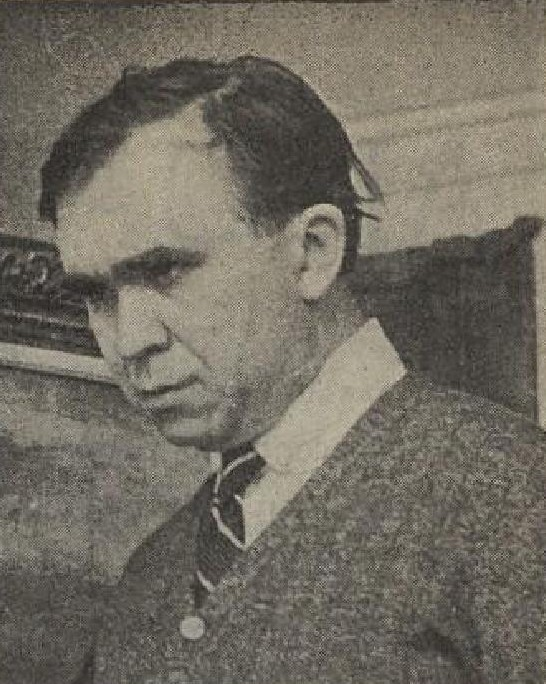
Rada in c. 1939

Vlastimil Rada (5 April 1895 – 22 December 1962) was a Czech painter and book illustrator.

== Life ==
Rada was born in České Budějovice in 1895. His father, Petr Rada, was a drawing teacher. In 1904 he moved to Prague with the family. In Prague, Rada graduated from a private art school, and, subsequently, between 1912 and 1919, he studied at the Academy of Fine Arts.

Between 1946 and 1962 Rada worked at the art school affiliated with the Academy of Fine Arts.

Rada was a figurative painter. His earlier works typically use dark colours. In the 1920s, under influence of Antonín Slavíček, he switched to impressionism. In the late 1920s, he created a number of monumental landscapes, which are considered his best works. In the 1930s, Rada switched to realism, using mostly brown, grey, and green colors. At the same period, he also worked in book illustration. In particular, Rada illustrated books by Charles Dickens and Jan Neruda.

His works are in collections of several museums including the National Gallery Prague, the Slovak National Gallery in Bratislava, and the Centre Pompidou in Paris. In 1976, there was a personal exhibition of works by Rada in the Prague Castle, and another one in 1999–2000 at the Lobkowicz Palace. He also had a number of personal exhibitions elsewhere in the Czech Republic.
