= Bohuš Čížek =

Czech painter (1913–1989)

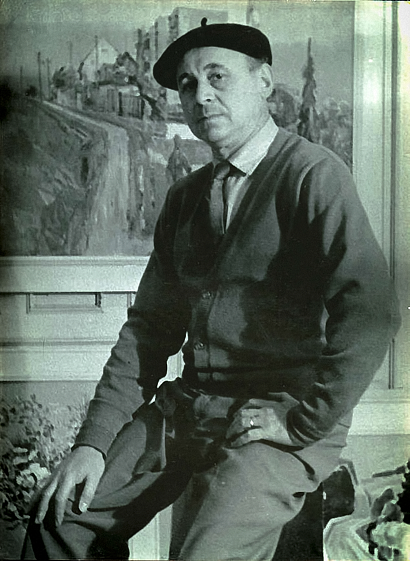
- Born: Bohumil Čížek; 11 February 1913; Lešany, Moravia, Austria-Hungary
- Died: 19 September 1989 (aged 76); Prague, Czechoslovakia
- Known for: Painting

Bohuš Čížek (born Bohumil Čížek, alternatively known as Bohouš Čížek; 11 February 1913 – 19 September 1989) was a Czech painter, draughtsman, graphic artist, illustrator and lecturer.

== Life ==
Bohuš Čížek was born into a family of farmer Bohumil Čížek and Marie Čížková, née Bláhová as their second son. At the estate farm he spent his childhood, acquiring first life sensations, developing imagination and drawing inspiration (among others through an illustrations by Adolf Kašpar, from a favourite book The Grandmother, in Czech: Babička).

In the years 1924–1933 he was attending a real school in Prostějov, where he was already drawing and painting a lot. Some of his schoolworks have been preserved. He applied himself to figurative art, ordinary things that surrounded him, and to landscape painting. He graduated by passing the upper secondary school examination in 1933.

After the leaving examination at secondary school, he started to study in 1934 at the Czech Technical University in Prague, precisely the School of Architecture and Building Construction (then becoming a faculty), professorship of drawing and descriptive geometry under the professors Oldřich Blažíček, Cyril Bouda and Karel Pokorný. In 1939 his studies were interrupted by closure of universities in a consequence of protests of students against the occupation of Czechoslovakia by Nazis, from a viewpoint of the occupants at that time, the Protectorate of Bohemia and Moravia. In October 1942, he managed to obtain a lodging in Žižkovo Square 2. He finished his studies after the war in 1945. Later on, he acquired a studio in Mánesova 32 after Alois Kalvoda, where he then worked throughout his life. He resided in Břevnov (district of Prague).

From 1 July 1945, he was employed as an assistant professor in the institute of drawing and painting at the School of Architecture and Building Construction in Prague. On 30 April 1949 he left per his own request and completely devoted himself to art.

On 27 August 1949, he married Zdeňka Bednaříková from Prague at the Old Town Hall. In 1951, their daughter Marie died at birth. In 1952, daughter Zdena was born and in 1955 daughter Hana. In 1972, he suffered a stroke, the first one, but overcame its consequences and remained artistically active. In 1981, when he went to paint alongside painter Veselka in the Bohemian Forest, he suffered the second stroke. He moved to Vimperk, from there to Prague to the hospital in Charles Square, and afterwards to Bohnice for a recovery. However, the conditions and care were so unbearable there, that his wife took him home (accordingly to their promise) to die there. He lived on for another 8 years, mostly lying or sitting. In those first years he tried to draw or to colour his earlier works. He died on 19 September 1989 at home.

== Works ==
=== Beginnings ===
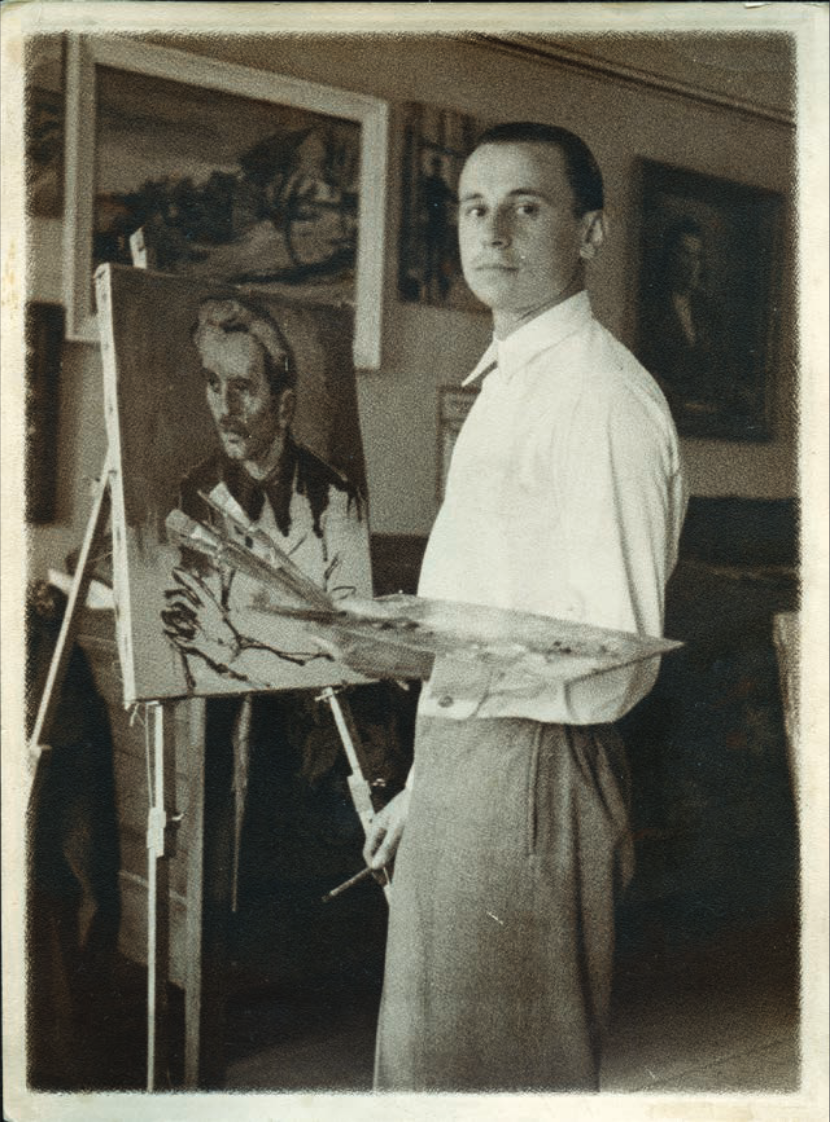
Bohumil "Bohuš" Čížek while painting, 1938

The beginnings of his works are figurative. He was showing a talent since primary school. An apparent influence on him had illustrations by Adolf Kašpar, as we may assume, since there is a correlation in expression with works of Bohuš Čížek, as well in proportions of his figures, those realistically externalized. He was then led by painter Antonín Kameník at school in Prostějov, who was a disciple of professors Vlaho Bukovac and František Ženíšek at the Academy of Fine Arts in Prague.

=== Era of studies and war ===
The change of location showed on his next creations. The distinct nature of Haná was replaced by an incidence of a living, historical, metropolitan city. At the same time, his studies opened up a door to new inspirations and sensations that he could work on with. Portrayed in Mr. Čížek's works, the era of the end of thirties then gave, as it was a forebode of evil and war, and then in forties, reflecting his feelings, be it an inwardly dramatic figurative art in subdued tones, rather rare nude paintings too, or an expressive depiction of trees and outbuildings with a deeply radiant or contrasting colour emphasizing disillusion from just occurring reality. (House in the Woods, 1940; Near the Village of Lešany, 1943; Rusava, 1943) His works made during the war or from a period when he was an assistant professor at the university refer to "Old Masters" or incline to cubism, precisely cubistic expressionism. He showcased his pieces even in the Topič salon.

List of exhibited pieces from the III. partial exhibition of the Spolek výtvarných umělců Aleš (The Aleš Society of Fine Artists) – Prague extension, Brno, KVU Pavilion "Aleš" (it was destroyed during the war), Raduit's Square, 23. 5.–20. 6. 1943):

- VI. Seal of St. John (in Czech: VI. pečeť sv. Jana), oil painting
- Black Little Hour (in Czech: Černá hodinka, oil painting
- Café (in Czech: Kavárna), oil painting
- People in the Bar (in Czech: Lidé v baru), oil painting
- Ascension (in Czech: Nanebevstoupení), oil painting

An art critic-reviewer of the Moravian newspaper, then, after seeing these works of art, states the following: "Paintings of B. Čížek shew an influence of Greco. Čížek strives to achieve a visual appeal by contrast of light and shadows and by a form shortcut. He achieved decent results." (Third part of the exhibition of "Aleš", 31. 5. 1943, Vol. 96, No. 131)

He is collaborating with several of publishers – (he) illustrates The Daughter of Sláva (in Czech: Slávy dcera) by Ján Kollár (Hranice, 1939), The Miraculous Hands (in Czech: Zázračné ruce) of Jan Weiss (Alois Hynek, Prague, 1943) and designs, but above all illustrates a cover for a historical novel by Francesco Perri, situated in the epoch of Jesus – The Unknown Disciple (in Czech: Neznámý učedník, in Italian: "Il discepolo ignoto"; ELK, a. s., Prague, 1942) of a unique and symbolic scene.

Considering a career of a teacher, he chose for his field of study a descriptive geometry and drawing at the Czech Technical University. At Charles University he then acquired a teaching's qualification. At professor Oldřich Blažíček then obtained mainly a knowledge about technology of painting, but dissatisfied with a traditional approach to reality as expressed by work of his mentor, he sought a new ways for assertion of a then current progressive expression.

=== Post-war era ===
The author uses softer and more of a vibrant colours in the second half of the forties. There is a shift from his cubistically expressionistic understanding of reality into suprareality, conceived by his own self, which is more lyrical, of an apparent geometrization, and with an elements of fauvism. The author depicts roofs of blocks of flats, Prague's arcades, interiors and exteriors with people and transilluminated window-cases reflecting on light. (Café, 1946; Quayage, 1947; Spring, 1948)

It is possible to notice that shift to the above-reality then also in another book illustrated by him, this time a fantasy one Earth of Auroral Sky (in Czech: Země červánků) by Jan J. Holub (Miroslav a Josef Stejskal Praha – Brno, 1946). He illustrates a war novel Suvorov in the Alps (in Czech: Suvorov v Alpách, originally in Russian "Альпы" ) by Anatolij V. Šiško (Mladá fronta, 1946) as well.

By the beginning of summer of the same year, an exhibition in Paris on rue La Boétie takes place, named "L'ART TCHÉCOSLOVAQUE 1938 – 1946" and Bohuš Čížek exhibits here. Her curators were Josef Šíma and Paul Éluard. The set ambition of the promoters was to display the best of what was made during those stated years. Its vernissage was attended by Pablo Picasso, who at dinner upon an invitation of envoy Adolf Hoffmeister, entirely drew a snowwhite table cloth prepared with this intention by him, which was then however in the morning taken to be washed by chambermaid..., his muse Dora Maar, writer Louis Aragon, Tristan Tzara, Fernand Léger and others. And so, this was a unique opportunity to show his art abroad as well, although there had been several prestigious exhibitions realized in homeland already, with more to be happening later on. Held in Prague, there was then a reconstruction of this special event in 2011 with period memorabilia.

=== The 1950s and the first half of the 1960s ===
With an incoming influence of socialist realism, a shift to a more "neutral" conception of paintings and drawings of the artist come to happen, sometimes with earthy colours, at other times richly colouring construction machines though. There – in the '50s – he demonstrated his landscape artistry to its fullest extent. (Autumn Manor, 1954; Pod Spiritkou, 1954; Ladronka, 1956)

There are also releases of books with his illustrations and cover designs in the 1950s, namely A Hundreds of Fires and Other Short Stories (in Czech: Sto ohňů a jiné povídky) by Ludvík Aškenazy (SNDK, Prague, 1953) and Journeymen (in Czech: Tovaryši) by Donát Šajner (SNDK, Prague, 1953). He also created illustrations by Státní pedagogické nakladatelství for "The Living Alphabet" (in Czech: Živá abeceda), boards for each letter, and historic painting of storming of the Hussites.

A turning point of the years fifties and sixties then partially marks a return to his advancement in fine art. He was portraying life in the town and also in the countryside (Prague's Arcade, 1961; A Street With a Scooter, 1963). He applied himself to abstract art as well.

=== The second half of the 1960s and later works ===
A significant part of his works then comprise village themes, picturesque little houses, parks and gardens, which he draws inspiration for in the landscapes of Šumava, Orlické hory, and in the outskirts of Prague. The artist proceeds himself right in that direction the most in his later years of life, overcoming health problems, and still working till 1981. An approach of a modernist changes to a plainer and more perspicuous way of an expression, since the year of 1970 presumably emanating from French post-impressionism, in case of some of his paintings with a temperate extension to the so-called "naive" art, and bearing signs of a sophisticated collage technique too (From Volyňsko, 1979) – perhaps an intention of the author to free from worries of life and to pass on this idyllic feeling to his watcher.

== Exhibitions ==
His first exhibition dates to 1936 along with unassociated artists in Prague's Mánes. In 1937 he had his first individual exhibition together with Václav Kolařík in Prostějov.

- 1940: An exhibition of allied cultural societies under aegis of Prostějov (10. 3.–25. 3. 1940)
- 1940: An exhibition of paintings in the trade school by the St. Peter and Paul Church, Prostějov (6.–20. 10. 1940)
- 1941: Členská výstava S. V. U. Mánes, exhibition hall, Prague (20. 3.–4. 5. 1941)
- 1941: Výstava spolku Aleš in Brno (9. 3.–30. 3. 1941)
- 1941: Výstava obrazů a kreseb Bohuše Čížka, Topič salon, Prague (8. 12.–28. 12. 1941)
- 1942: Výstava členů Skupiny olomouckých výtvarníků a S. V. U. Aleš, Brno, Kiosk (25. 7.–30. 8. 1942)
- 1942: Národ svým výtvarným umělcům in Prague (20. 1.–20. 2. 1942)
- 1943: Umělci národu, Výstava soudobého umění v Praze, Prague galleries (23. 1.–28. 2. 1943)
- 1943: „Od inspirace k dílu“ ("From inspiration to art piece"), SOV members, Prombergův salon umění, Olomouc (11. 4.–9. 5. 1943)
- 1943: III. dílčí výstava spolku VU Aleš Prague extension, KVU Pavilion Aleš, Brno (23. 5.–20. 6. 1943)
- 1943: Osmý zlínský salon, Studijní ústav ve Zlíně (30. 5.–31. 8. 1943)
- 1943: Členská výstava obrazů a soch S. V. U. Aleš Prague extension, Stará pošta, Rakovník (9. 5.–23. 5. 1943)
- 1943: 5. výstava: Bohuš Čížek – oleje, SOV exhibition hall, Prague (15. 11.–5. 12. 1943)
- 1943: Přehlídka 99ti, Topič salon, Prague (25. 5–14. 6. 1943)
- 1943: Výstava obrazů a soch členů a hostů S. V. U. Mánes, Doležal hall, Pardubice (21. 11.–5. 12. 1943)
- 1943/1944: 10. členská výstava SOV, Olomouc (12. 12. 1943–3. 1. 1944)
- 1944: 7. výstava – členská výstava skupiny olomouckých výtvarníků, SOV exhibition hall, Prague (22. 1.–20. 2. 1944)
- 1944: Výstava členů a hostů S. V. U. Mánes, Městský dům Prostějov (2. 4.–16. 4. 1944)
- 1946: L'ART TCHÉCOSLOVAQUE 1938 – 1946, L'Association France-Tchécoslovaquie, Galerie La Boëtie, Paris (14. 6.–14. 7. 1946)
- 1946/1947: Jednota umělců výtvarných: Členská výstava, Pavilon Jednoty výtvarných umělců, Prague (23. 11. 1946–5 1. 1947)
- 1947: Jednota umělců výtvarných: Členská výstava 1947, Pavilon Jednoty výtvarných umělců, Prague (1. 10.–2.11.1947)
- 1948: Členové JUV (7. 1.–1. 2. 1948)
- 1948: 11. zlínský salon, The House of Arts (then and now Tomáš Baťa Memorial), Zlín (6. 6.–31. 8. 1948)
- 1948/1949: 50 let Jednoty umělců výtvarných (Díl II.), Pavilon Jednoty výtvarných umělců, Prague (5. 11. 1948–2. 1. 1949)
- 1949: JUV Pavilion, Prague (16. 3.–19. 4. 1949)
- 1949: Výtvarník mezi horníky, Slovanský ostrov, exhibition building of the Umělecká beseda, Prague (9. 9.–3. 10. 1949)
- 1949: Výtvarníci JUV, Exhibition House of Czechoslovakia, Karlovy Vary, (from June to July 1949)
- 1949/1950: Výtvarní umělci k II. všeodborovému sjezdu, House of Fine Arts, Prague (3. 12. 1949–8. 1. 1950)
- 1951/1952: Výtvarná úroda 1951, Výstava SČVU, Mánes & Slovanský ostrov, Prague (1. 12. 1951–20. 1. 1952)
- 1956/1957: 3. pražský salon VU, Municipal House, Prague (19. 11. 1956–5. 1. 1957)
- 1953: II. přehlídka československého výtvarného umění, Prague Castle Riding School, Prague (May–October 1953)
- 1954: Ze současné tvorby, Výstava SČVU, Hradec Králové (24. 10.–24. 11. 1954)
- 1955/1956: DESET LET Československé lidově demokratické republiky ve výtvarném umění: Malířství, Municipal Library of Prague (December–February)
- 1956/1957: III. pražský salón, Municipal House, Prague (19. 11. 1956–5. 1. 1957)
- 1957: Malá krajina, gallery of the ČFVU in Prague (2. 8.–9. 9. 1957)
- 1958: Obrazy, sochy, grafika, výstava pražských výtvarníků SČSVU, Prague (1. 6.–30. 6. 1958)
- 1960: VII. pražský salon (November 1960)
- 1961: Bohuš Čížek – obrazy a kresby, Galerie Nová síň, Prague (14. 3.–9. 4. 1961)
- 1961: Výstava tvůrčí skupiny VU SČVU, Municipal House, Prague (October–November 1961)
- 1962: Obrazy z cest i domova – Bohuš Čížek, Jaroslav Kotas, Kabinet umění Brno (29. 10.–17. 11. 1962)
- 1963: Bohuš Čížek – kresby, studie, linoryty, výstava k 50. narozeninám, Homeland museum in Prostějov (8. 9.–6. 10. 1963)
- 1963: Výstava tvůrčí skupiny VU, Galerie Nová síň, Prague (13. 9.–13. 10. 1963)
- 1967: Česká krajina, Galerie U Řečických, Prague (22. 2.–19. 3. 1967)
- 1967: 1. pražský salon, Brussels pavilion (Expo 58 ART), Prague (20. 7.–25. 8. 1967)
- 1967: Obrazy z jižních Čech, strakonická krajina, Museum of Central Pootaví, Strakonice Castle (10. 9.–10. 10. 1967)
- 1967: Umělci k výročí Října, Bruselský pavilon, Prague (6. 11.–26. 11. 1967)
- 1968: Variace na jihočeský motiv, Museum of Central Pootaví, Strakonice Castle (4. 8.–31. 8.1968)
- 1969: 2. pražský salón obrazů, soch a grafik, Dům U Hybernů, Prague (23. 9.–28. 10. 1969)
- 1970: Bohuš Čížek: Obrazy a grafika z let 1962–1970, Galerie bratří Čapků, Prague (3. 4.–10. 5. 1970). /The themes of South Bohemia continue. A new passion for graphic art – monotypes, a new possibilities of creation and inspiration for oil painting.
- 1971: Mizející krajina – obrazy z povodí Želivky, Galerie U Řečických, Prague (15. 4.–16. 5. 1971)
- 1972: Mizející krajina očima pražských výtvarníků, Galerie U Řečických, Prague (27. 4.–18. 6. 1972)
- 1974: Manželství, rodičovství a život našich dětí v obrazech, sochách, grafice a užitém umění, Galerie U Řečických, Prague (4. 7.–4. 8. 1974)
- 1975: Výtvarní umělci k 30. výročí osvobození Československa Sovětskou armádou, Prague, (May–July 1975)
- 1977: Bohuš Čížek – obrazy, grafika, kresby, Galerie Československý spisovatel, Prague (11. 10.–13. 11. 1977)
- 1979: Výtvarní umělci dětem, salons: Mánes, Galerie Nová síň, Galerie U Řečických, Prague (September–October 1979)
- 1980: Malíři jižních Čech, Museum of Central Pootaví, Strakonice (May 1980)
- 1984: Bojující umění (obrazy, plastiky), Muzeum Prostějovska, Prostějov (September 1984)
- 1985: Vyznání životu a míru: Přehlídka československého výtvarného umění k 40. výročí osvobození Československa Sovětskou armádou, Prague (May–August) & Bratislava (September–October 1985)
- 1986: Bohuš Čížek – obrazy, exhibition halls of Prostějov manor (December 1986)
- 1987: Obrazy a sochy: Výstava pražských členů Svazu českých výtvarných umělců, Mánes, Prague (5. 3.–12. 4. 1987)
- 1988: lidé-život-práce, Výtvarná díla ze sbírek Ústřední rady odborů, Výstava k 40. výročí Vítězného února, Mánes, Prague (18. 2.–3. 4. 1988)
- 1988: Salón pražských výtvarných umělců '88, Julius Fučík Park of Culture and Rest, Prague (8. 7.–7. 8. 1988)
- 2000: Bohuš Čížek, Hana Dvořáčková (Čížková) – obrazy, kresby, Prostějov manor (29. 6.–3. 9. 2000)
- 2008: Šumavské proměny: Krajina Šumavy v dílech malířů 19. a 20. století, The Wortner's House, České Budějovice (10. 7.–7. 9. 2008)
- 2009: Socialistický realismus: Československo 1948–1989, Mánes, Prague (3. 12.–30. 12. 2009)
- 2012: Realismo socialista Cecoslovacchia 1948–1989, Villa Manin a Passariano di Codroipo, Udine (23. 3.–8. 7. 2012)
- 2014: PROMĚNY ČASU, Výstava z díla Bohuše Čížka k nedožitým 101. narozeninám, Museum and Gallery in Prostějov (10. 4.–25. 5. 2014)
- 2019: La forma dell'ideologia. Praga: 1948–1989, Palazzo del Governatore, Parma (25. 5.–28. 7. 2019)
