= Lešany =

Lešany may refer to places in the Czech Republic:

- Lešany (Benešov District), a municipality and village in the Central Bohemian Region
- Lešany (Prostějov District), a municipality and village in the Olomouc Region
- Lešany, a village and part of Nelahozeves in the Central Bohemian Region
- Lešany, a village and part of Skuteč in the Pardubice Region
