= Vincent Stuart Ltd. =

Defunct British publishing company

Vincent Stuart Ltd. was a British publishing company. The company specialized in mystical and metaphysical books.

== Selection of works published ==
- The Book of Ruth. 1934. 50 copies, designed & hand printed at Flansham.
- Psychological Commentaries. On the Teaching of G.I. Gurdjieff and P.D. Ouspensky, 5 Volumes. Maurice Nicoll. 1952
- The Theory of Celestial Influence. Rodney Collin. 1954
- The Theory of Eternal Life. Rodney Collin. 1956
- MOUNT ANALOGUE: An Authentic Narrative. René Daumal, translation and introduction by Roger Shattuck with a postface by Véra Daumal. 1959
- The Mirror of Light from the Notebooks of Rodney Collin. Rodney Collin. 1959
- The One Work: A Journey Towards the Self. Anne Gage. 1961
- The Philosophy of Compassion: The Return of the Goddess. Esme Wynne-Tyson. 1962.
- Triumphal Chariot of Antimony : With the Commentary of Theodorus Kerckringius. Basilius Valentinus. 1962
- Collectanea Chemica: Being Select Treatises On Alchemy And Hermetic Medicine. Eirenaeus Philalethes, translated by A. E. Waite. 1963
- The Way Within: A Book of Psychological Documentaries. Wyatt Rawson. 1963.
- Animal Machines: the new factory farming industry. Ruth Harrison. 1964.
