= Alcohol intoxication =

Behavioural and physical changes due to the consumption of alcohol

- Other names: Inebriation, drunkenness, ethanol intoxication, internal damage by alcohol
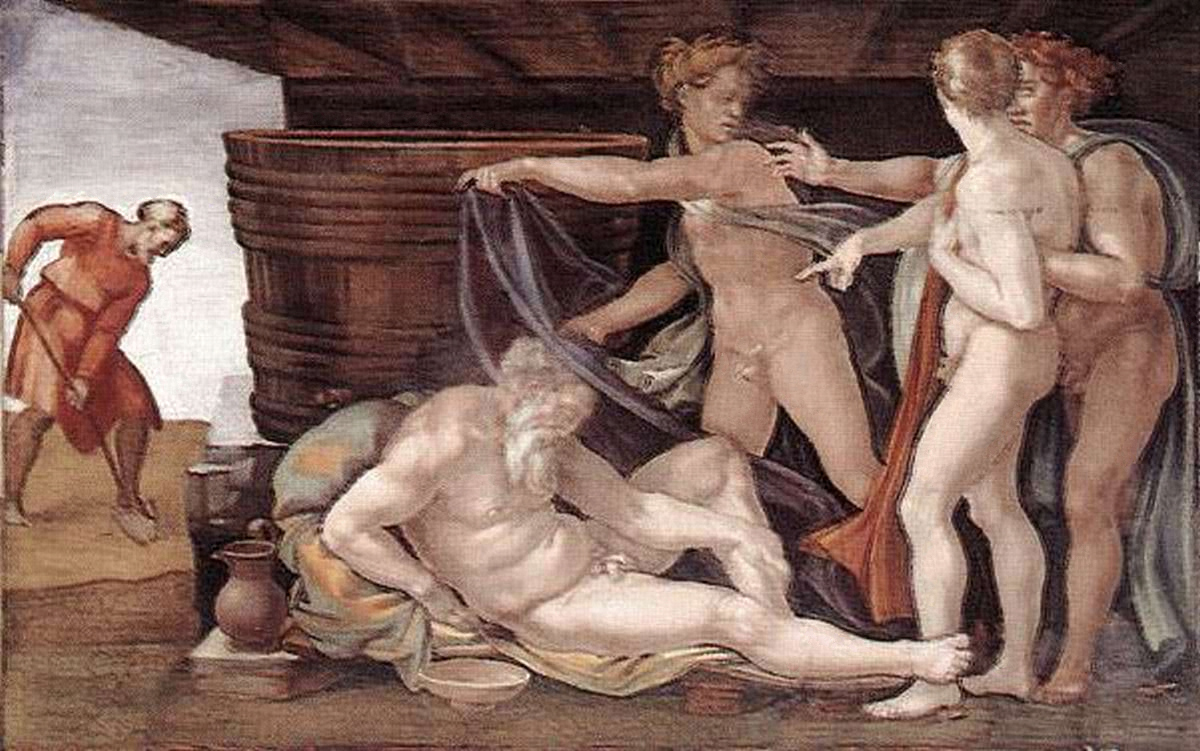
- The Drunkenness of Noah by Michelangelo, 1509
- Specialty: Toxicology, psychiatry
- Symptoms: Mild: Mild sedation, decreased coordination Moderate: Slurred speech, trouble walking, vomiting Severe: Decreased effort to breathe, coma
- Complications: Seizures, aspiration pneumonia, injuries, low blood sugar
- Usual onset: Over minutes to hours (depends on how much one drinks)
- Duration: Several hours
- Causes: Alcohol (ethanol)
- Risk factors: Social environment, impulsivity, anxiety, alcoholism
- Diagnostic method: Typically based on history of events and physical examination
- Differential diagnosis: Hepatic encephalopathy, Wernicke encephalopathy, methanol toxicity, meningitis, traumatic brain injury
- Treatment: Supportive care
- Frequency: Very common
- Deaths: c. 2,200 per year (U.S.)

Alcohol intoxication, commonly described in higher doses as drunkenness or inebriation, and known in overdose as alcohol poisoning, is the behavior and physical effects caused by recent consumption of alcohol. The technical term intoxication in common speech may suggest that a large amount of alcohol has been consumed, leading to accompanying physical symptoms and deleterious health effects. Mild intoxication is mostly referred to by slang terms such as tipsy or buzzed. In addition to the toxicity of ethanol, the main psychoactive component of alcoholic beverages, other physiological symptoms may arise from the activity of acetaldehyde, a metabolite of alcohol. These effects may not arise until hours after ingestion and may contribute to a condition colloquially known as a hangover.

Symptoms of intoxication at lower doses may include mild sedation and poor coordination. At higher doses, there may be slurred speech, trouble walking, impaired vision, mood swings and vomiting. Extreme doses may result in a respiratory depression, coma, or death. Complications may include seizures, aspiration pneumonia, low blood sugar, and injuries or self-harm such as suicide. Alcohol intoxication can lead to alcohol-related crime, with perpetrators more likely to be intoxicated than victims.

Alcohol intoxication typically begins after two or more alcoholic drinks. Alcohol has the potential for abuse. Risk factors include a social situation where heavy drinking is common and a person having an impulsive personality. Diagnosis is usually based on the history of events and physical examination. Verification of events by witnesses may be useful. Legally, alcohol intoxication is often defined as a blood alcohol concentration (BAC) of greater than 5.4–17.4 mmol/L (25–80 mg/dL or 0.025–0.080%). This can be measured by blood or breath testing. Alcohol is broken down in the human body at a rate of about 3.3 mmol/L (15 mg/dL) per hour, depending on an individual's metabolic rate (metabolism). The DSM-5 defines alcohol intoxication as at least one of the following symptoms that developed during or close after alcohol ingestion: slurred speech, incoordination, unsteady walking/movement, nystagmus (uncontrolled eye movement), attention or memory impairment, or near unconsciousness or coma.

Management of alcohol intoxication involves supportive care. Typically, this includes putting the person in the recovery position, keeping the person warm, and making sure breathing is sufficient. Gastric lavage and activated charcoal have not been found to be useful. Repeated assessments may be required to rule out other potential causes of a person's symptoms.

Acute intoxication has been documented throughout history, and alcohol remains one of the world's most widespread recreational drugs. Some religions, such as Islam, consider alcohol intoxication to be a sin.

== Symptoms ==
- Vomiting
- Slow breathing (fewer than eight breaths per minute)
- Seizures
- Blue, grey or pale skin
- Hypothermia (Low body temperature)
- Lethargy (Trouble staying conscious)

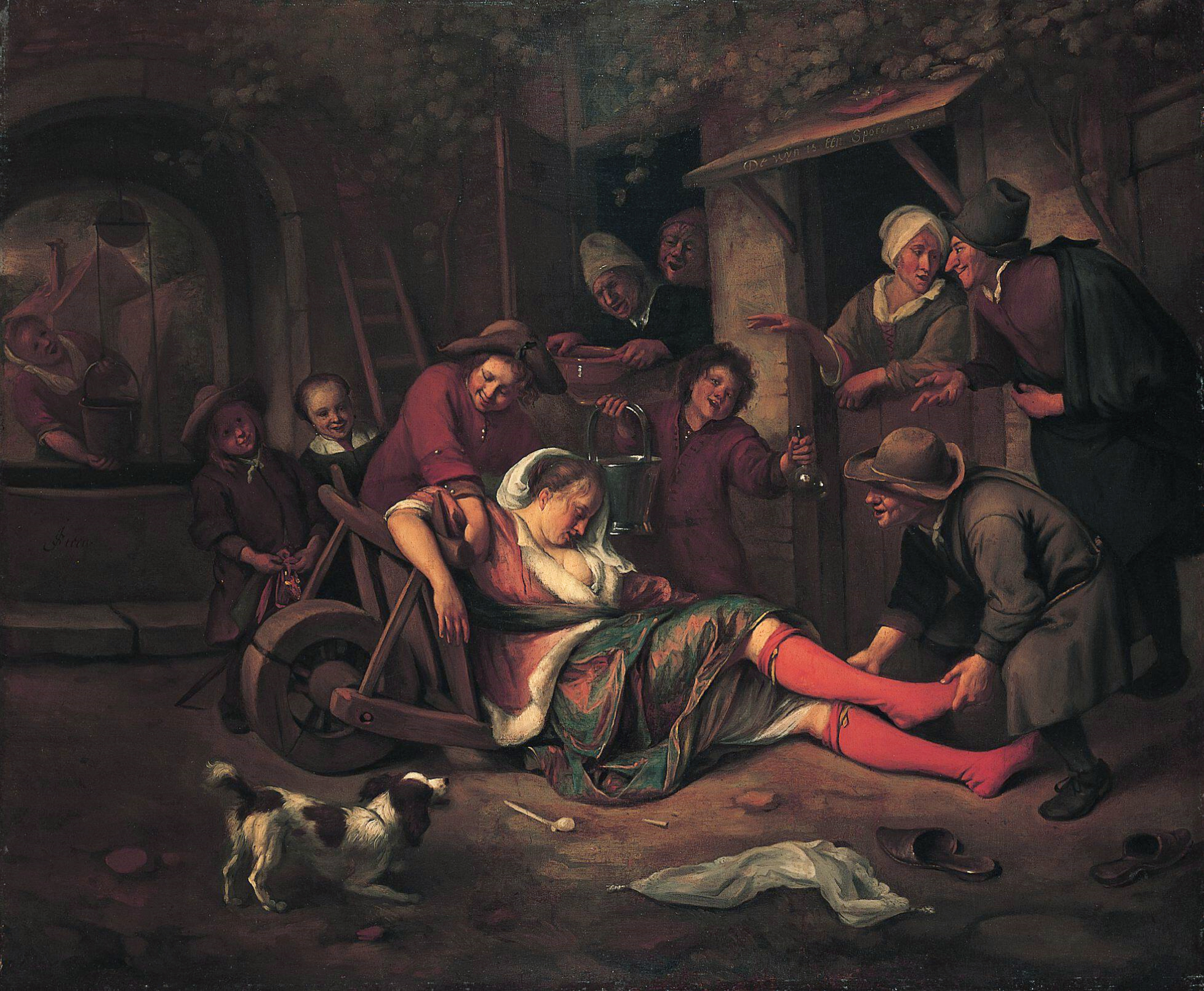
Wine is a Mocker by Jan Steen c. 1663

Alcohol intoxication leads to negative health effects due to the recent drinking of large amount of ethanol (alcohol). When severe it may become a medical emergency. Some effects of alcohol intoxication, such as euphoria and lowered social inhibition, are central to alcohol's desirability.

As drinking increases, people become sleepy or fall into a stupor. At very high blood alcohol concentrations, for example, above 0.3%, the respiratory system becomes depressed and the person may stop breathing. Comatose patients may aspirate their vomit (resulting in vomitus in the lungs, which may cause "drowning" and later pneumonia if survived). CNS depression and impaired motor coordination, along with poor judgment, increase the likelihood of accidental injury occurring. It is estimated that about one-third of alcohol-related deaths are due to accidents, and another 14% are from intentional injury.

In addition to respiratory failure and accidents caused by its effects on the central nervous system, alcohol causes significant metabolic derangements. Hypoglycaemia occurs due to ethanol's inhibition of gluconeogenesis, especially in children, and may cause lactic acidosis, ketoacidosis, and acute kidney injury. Metabolic acidosis is compounded by respiratory failure. Patients may also present with hypothermia.

== Pathophysiology ==
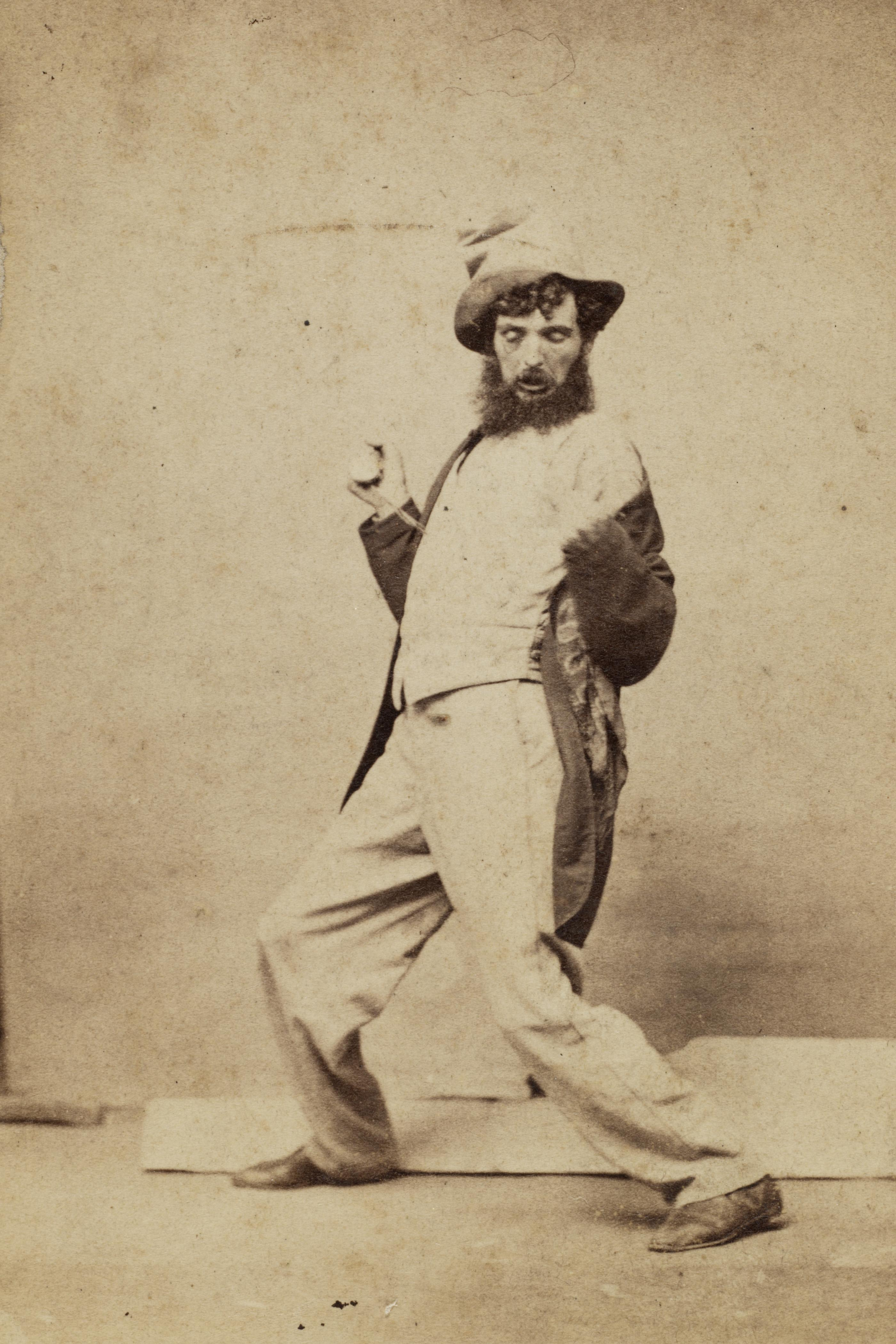
Stage three of the five stages of inebriation, c. 1863–1868, by Charles Percy Pickering

Alcohol is metabolized by a normal liver at the rate of about 8 grams of pure ethanol per hour. 8 grams or 10 mL (0.34 US fl oz) is one British standard unit. An "abnormal" liver with conditions such as hepatitis, cirrhosis, gall bladder disease, and cancer is likely to result in a slower rate of metabolism.

== Diagnosis ==
Alcohol intoxication is described as a mental and behavioural disorder in the International Classification of Diseases. Definitive diagnosis relies on a blood test for alcohol, usually performed as part of a toxicology screen. Law enforcement officers in the United States and other countries often use breathalyzer units and field sobriety tests as more convenient and rapid alternatives to blood tests. There are also various models of breathalyzer units that are available for consumer use. Because these may have varying reliability and may produce different results than the tests used for law-enforcement purposes, the results from such devices should be conservatively interpreted.

Many informal intoxication tests exist, which, in general, are unreliable and not recommended as deterrents to excessive intoxication or as indicators of the safety of activities such as motor vehicle driving, heavy equipment operation, machine tool use, etc.

For determining whether someone is intoxicated by alcohol by some means other than a blood-alcohol test, it is necessary to rule out other conditions such as hypoglycemia, stroke, usage of other intoxicants, mental health issues, and so on. It is best if their behavior has been observed while the subject is sober to establish a baseline. Several well-known criteria can be used to establish a probable diagnosis. For a physician in the acute-treatment setting, acute alcohol intoxication can mimic other acute neurological disorders or is frequently combined with other recreational drugs that complicate diagnosis and treatment.

== Management ==
Acute alcohol poisoning (an overdose of the drug) is a medical emergency due to the risk of death from respiratory depression or aspiration of vomit if vomiting occurs while the person is unresponsive. Emergency treatment strives to stabilize and maintain an open airway and sufficient breathing while waiting for the alcohol to metabolize. This can be done by removal of any vomit or, if the person is unconscious or has impaired gag reflex, intubation of the trachea.

Other measures may include

- Administer the vitamin thiamine to prevent Wernicke–Korsakoff syndrome, which can cause a seizure (more usually a treatment for chronic alcoholism, but in the acute context usually co-administered to ensure maximal benefit).
- Hemodialysis if the blood concentration is very high at >130 mmol/L (>600 mg/dL)
- Provide oxygen therapy as needed via nasal cannula or non-rebreather mask.
- Administration of intravenous fluids in cases involving hypoglycemia and electrolyte imbalance.
- While the medication metadoxine may speed the breakdown of alcohol, use in alcohol intoxication requires further study as of 2017. It is approved in a number of countries in Europe, as well as India and Brazil.

Additional medication may be indicated for treatment of nausea, tremor, and anxiety.

== Clinical findings ==
=== Hospital admissions ===
Alcohol intoxication was found to be prevalent in clinical populations within the United States involving people treated for trauma and in the age group of people aged within their 18th–24th years (in a study of a group for the years 1999–2004). In the United States during the years 2010–2012, acute intoxication was found to be the direct cause of an average of 2,221 deaths, in the sample group of those aged within their 15th year or older. The same mortality route is thought to cause indirectly more than 30,000 deaths per year.

=== Prognosis ===
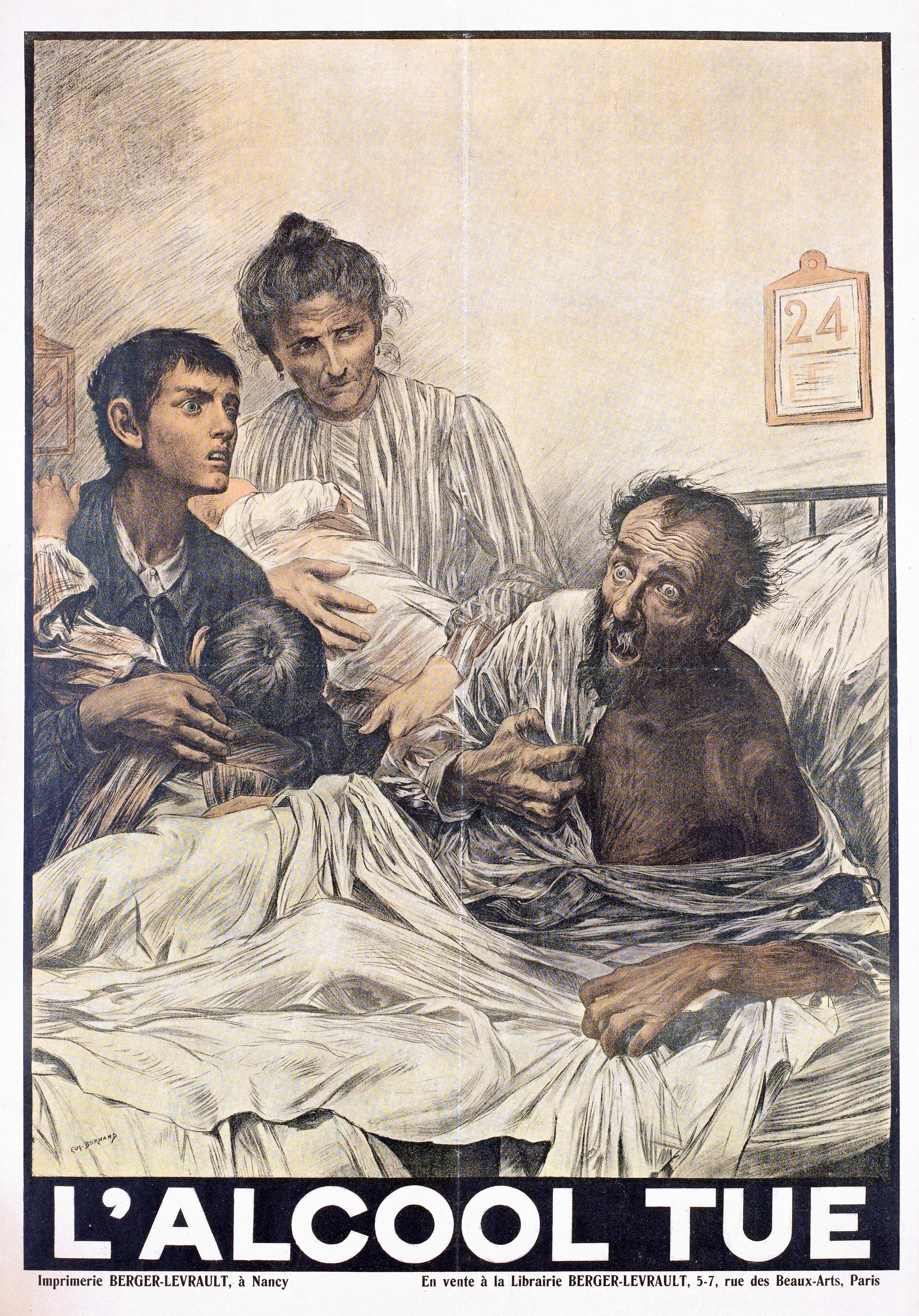
Acute confusional state caused by alcohol withdrawal, otherwise known as delirium tremens

A normal liver detoxifies the blood of alcohol over a period of time that depends on the initial level and the patient's overall physical condition. An abnormal liver will take longer but still succeeds, provided the alcohol does not cause liver failure.

People who have drunk heavily for several days or weeks may have withdrawal symptoms after the acute intoxication has subsided.

A person consuming a dangerous amount of alcohol persistently can develop memory blackouts and idiosyncratic intoxication or pathological drunkenness symptoms. Long-term persistent consumption of excessive amounts of alcohol can cause liver damage and have other deleterious health effects.

== Society and culture ==
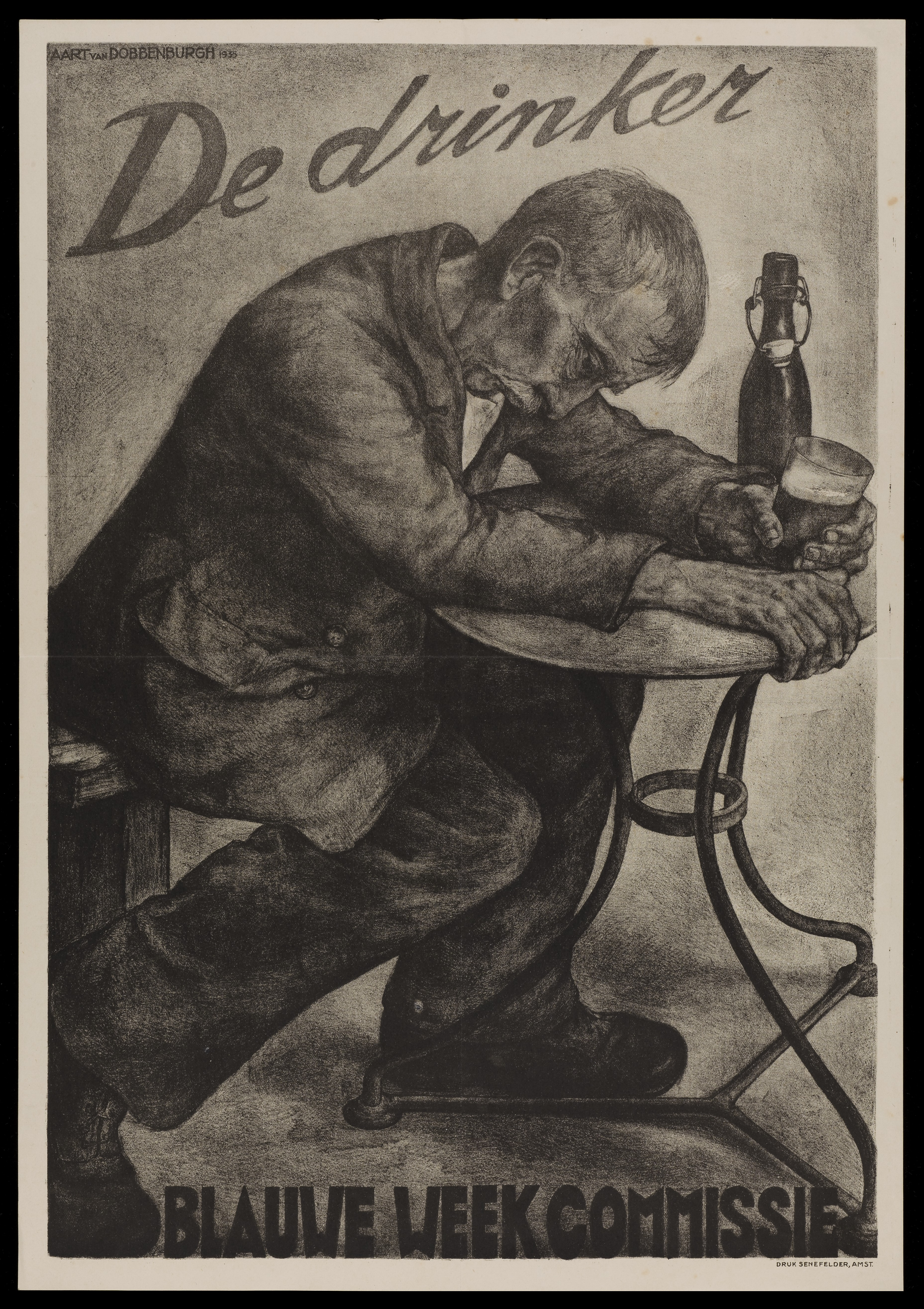
A 1936 anti-drinking poster by Aart van Dobbenburgh

Alcohol intoxication is a risk factor in some cases of catastrophic injury, in particular for unsupervised recreational activity. A study in the province of Ontario based on epidemiological data from 1986, 1989, 1992, and 1995 states that 79.2% of the 2,154 catastrophic injuries recorded for the study were preventable, of which 346 (17%) involved alcohol consumption. The activities most commonly associated with alcohol-related catastrophic injury were snowmobiling (124), fishing (41), diving (40), boating (31) and canoeing (7), swimming (31), riding an all-terrain vehicle (24), and cycling (23). These events are often associated with unsupervised young males, often inexperienced in the activity, and may result in drowning. Alcohol and sex are associated with unsafe sex and drug-facilitated sexual assaults. The ability for sexual consent due to alcohol consumption might be difficult to determine and might require an expert witness.

=== Legal issues ===
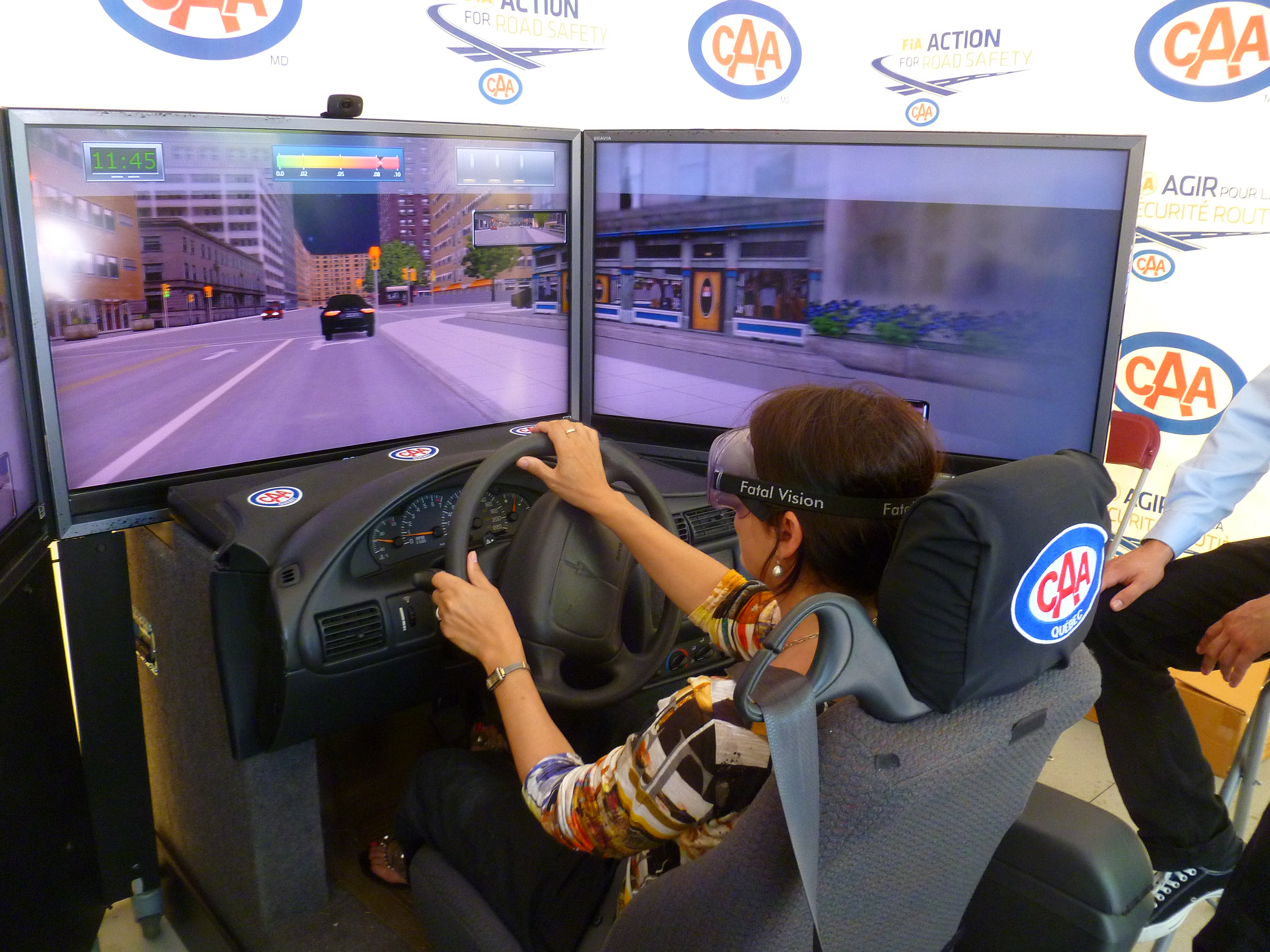
A drunk-driving simulator in Montreal

Laws on drunkenness vary. In the United States, it is a criminal offense for a person to be drunk while driving a motorized vehicle, except in Wisconsin, where it is only a fine for the first offense. It is also a criminal offense to fly an aircraft or (in some American states) to assemble or operate an amusement park ride while drunk. Similar laws also exist in most other countries.

In some jurisdictions, it is also an offense to serve alcohol to an already-intoxicated person, and, often, alcohol can only be sold by persons qualified to serve responsibly through alcohol server training.

The blood alcohol content (BAC) for legal operation of a vehicle is typically measured as a percentage of a unit volume of blood. This percentage ranges from 0.00% in Romania and the United Arab Emirates; to 0.05% in Australia, South Africa, Germany, Scotland, and New Zealand (0.00% for underage individuals); to 0.08% in England and Wales, the United States and Canada.

The United States Federal Aviation Administration prohibits crew members from performing their duties within eight hours of consuming an alcoholic beverage, while under the influence of alcohol, or with a BAC greater than 0.04%.

In the United States, the United Kingdom, and Australia, public intoxication is a crime (also known as "being drunk and disorderly" or "being drunk and incapable").

In some countries, there are special facilities, sometimes known as "drunk tanks", for the temporary detention of persons found to be drunk.

=== Religious views ===
Some religious groups permit the consumption of alcohol; some permit consumption but prohibit intoxication; others prohibit any amount of alcohol consumption altogether.

==== Christianity ====
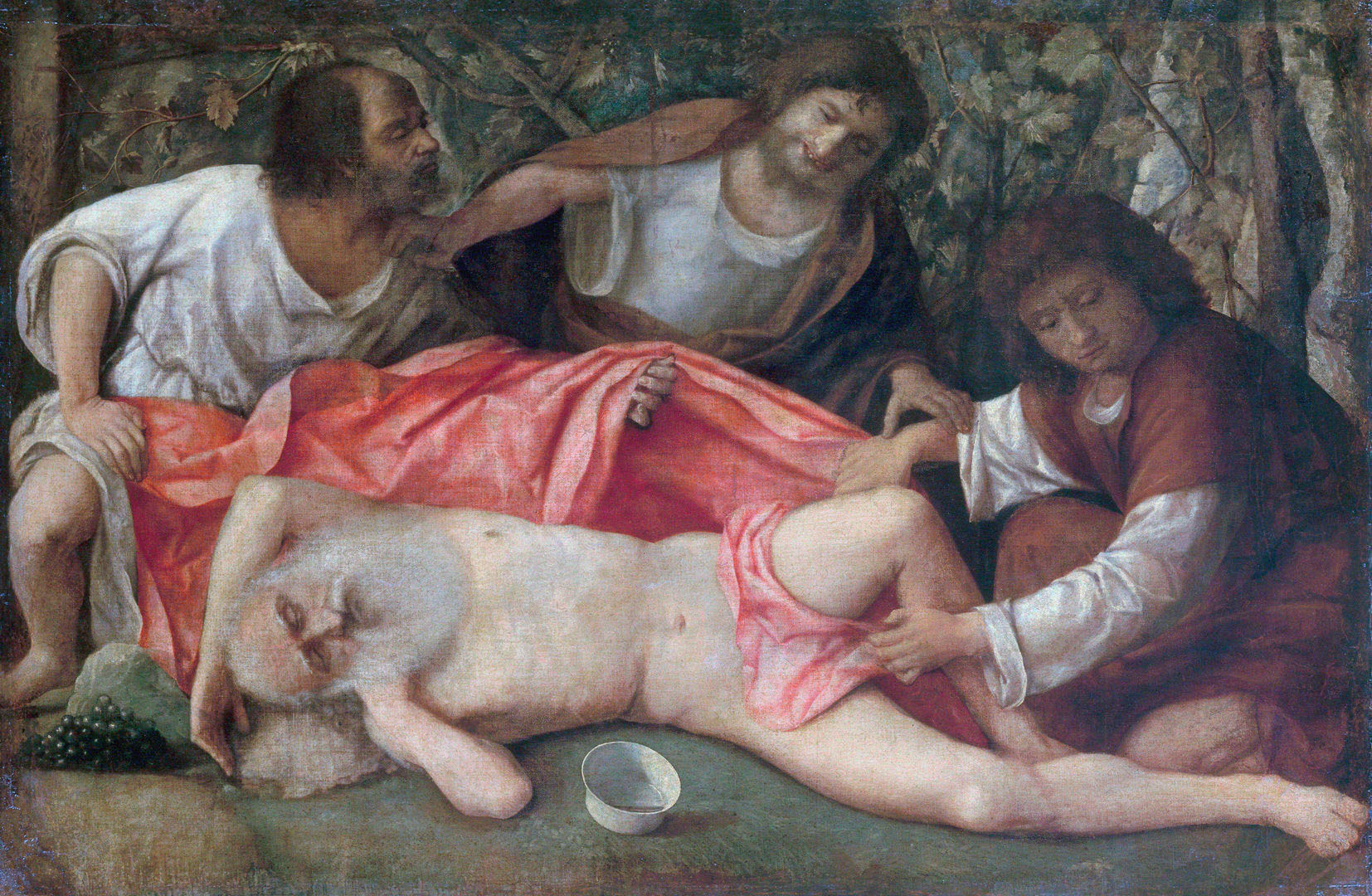
Drunkenness of Noah by Giovanni Bellini

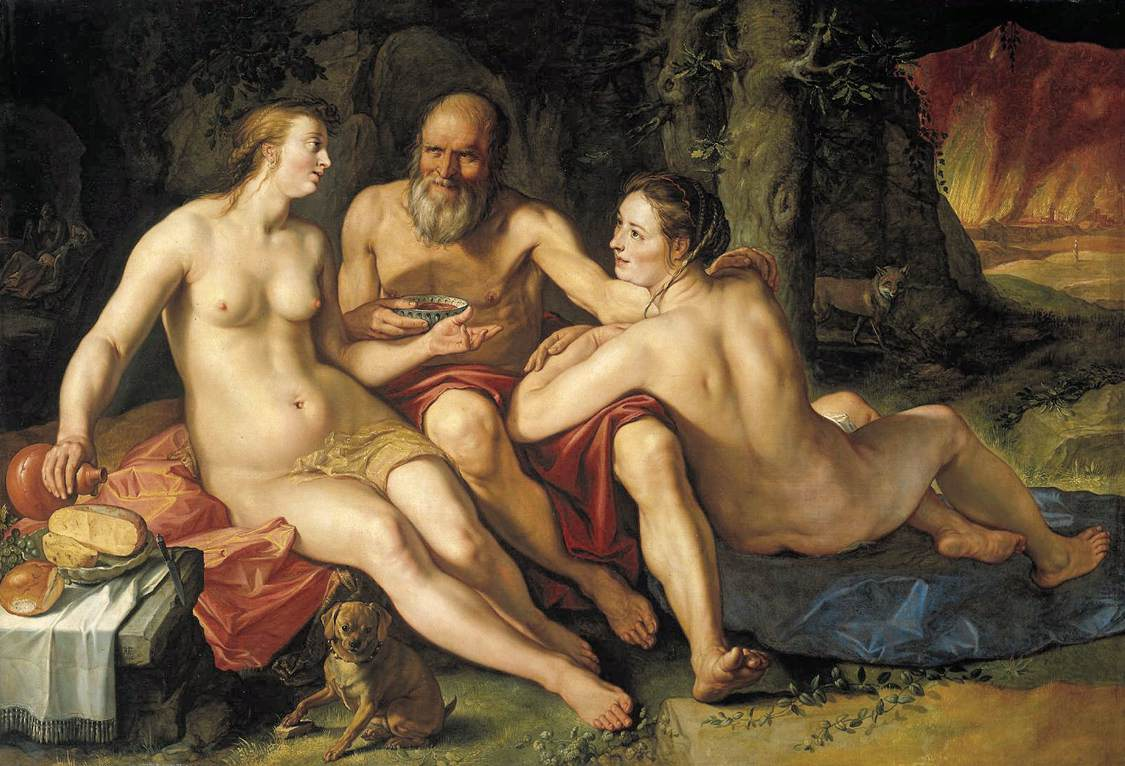
Lot and his daughters by Hendrick Goltzius

Some denominations of Christianity, such as Catholicism, Orthodoxy and Lutheranism, use wine as a part of the Eucharist (Holy Communion) and permit its consumption, but consider it sinful to become intoxicated.

Romans 13:13–14, 1 Corinthians 6:9–11, Galatians 5:19–21 and Ephesians 5:18 are among a number of other Bible passages that speak against intoxication.

Some Protestant Christian denominations prohibit the consumption of alcohol based upon biblical passages that condemn drunkenness, but others allow a moderate rate of consumption.

In the Church of Jesus Christ of Latter-day Saints, consumption is forbidden, and teetotalism has become a distinguishing feature of its members. Jehovah's Witnesses allow moderate alcohol consumption among its members.

==== Islam ====
In the Quran, there is a prohibition on the consumption of grape-based alcoholic beverages, and intoxication is considered an abomination in the hadith of Muhammad. The schools of thought of Islamic jurisprudence have interpreted this as a strict prohibition of the consumption of all types of alcohol and declared it to be haram (lit. 'forbidden [in Islam]'), although other uses may be permitted.

==== Buddhism ====
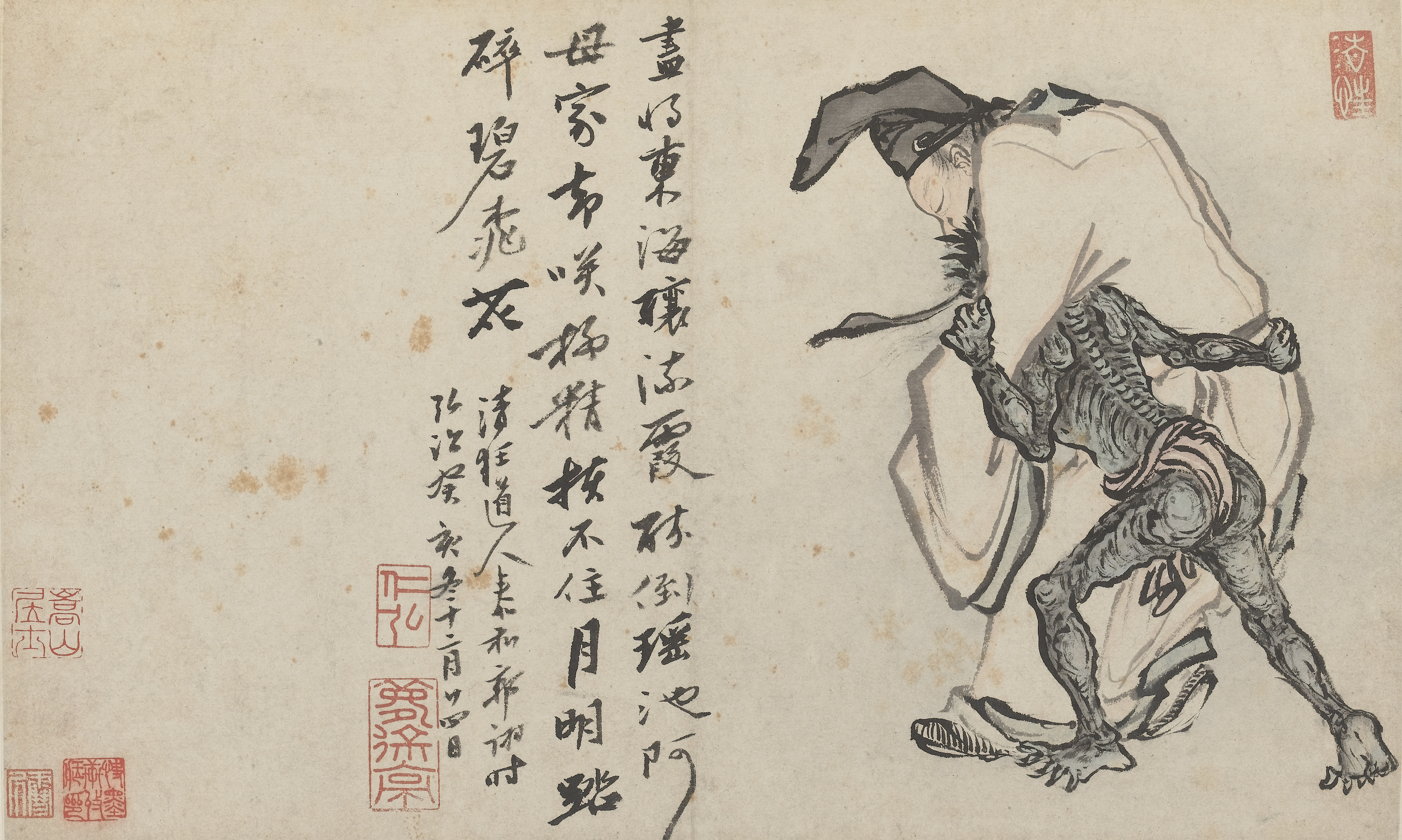
Drunken Immortal supported and escorted by a demon, by Guo Xu, Ming dynasty China.

In Buddhism, in general, the consumption of intoxicants is discouraged for both monastics and lay followers. Many Buddhists observe a basic code of ethics known as the five precepts, of which the fifth precept is an undertaking to refrain from the consumption of intoxicating substances (except for medical reasons). In the bodhisattva vows of the Brahmajala Sutra, observed by Mahayana Buddhist communities, distribution of intoxicants is likewise discouraged, as well as consumption.

==== Hinduism ====
In the Gaudiya Vaishnavism branch of Hinduism, one of the four regulative principles forbids the taking of intoxicants, including alcohol.

==== Judaism ====
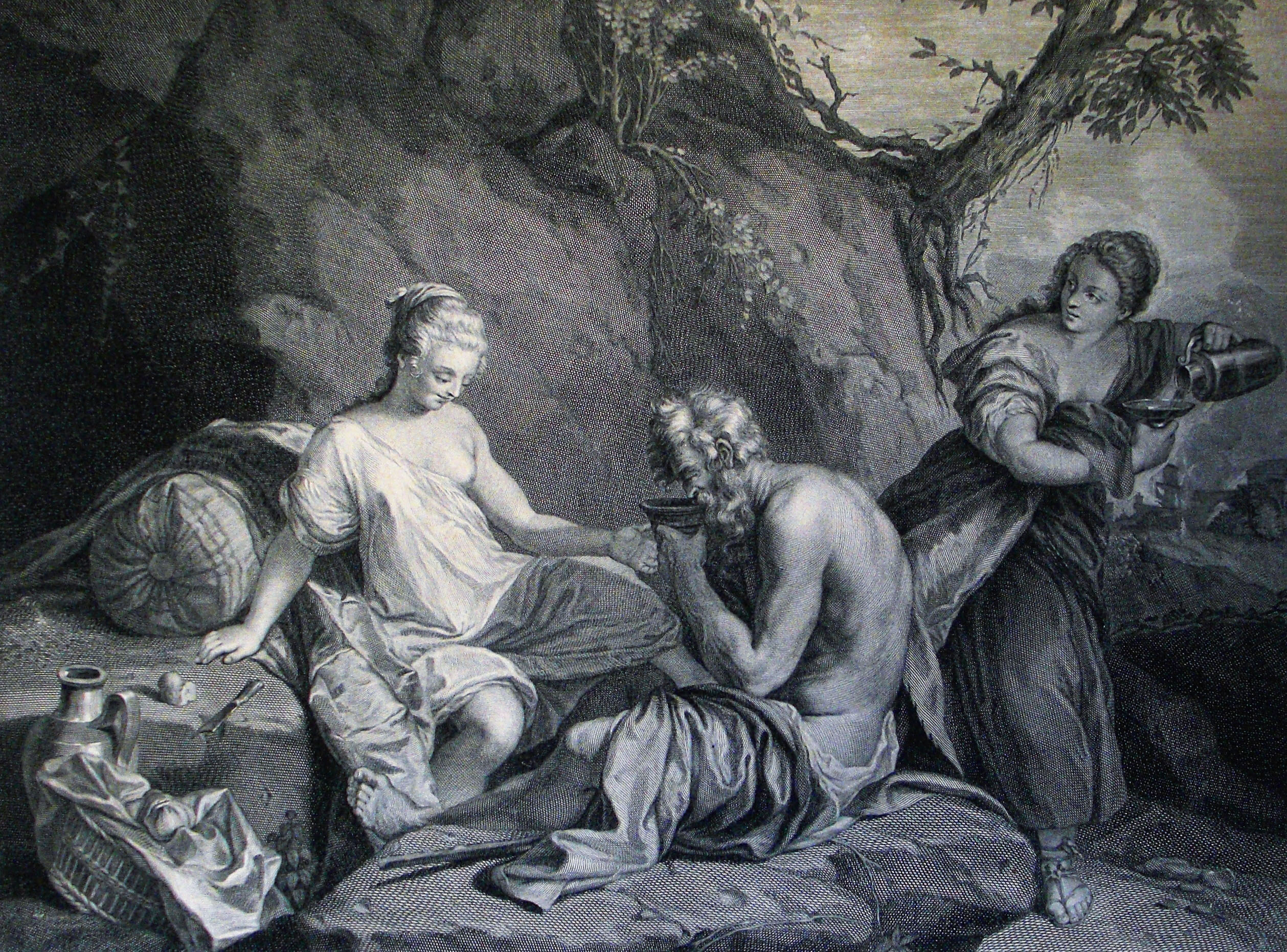
Drunken Lot and his daughters, from an illustrated Torah

In the Bible, the Book of Proverbs contains several chapters related to the negative effects of drunkenness and warns to stay away from intoxicating beverages. The Book of Genesis refers to the use of wine by Lot's daughters to rape him. The story of Samson in the Book of Judges tells of a monk from the Israelite tribe of Dan who, as a Nazirite, is prohibited from cutting his hair and drinking wine. Proverbs 31:4 warns against kings and other rulers drinking wine and similar alcoholic beverages, Proverbs 31:6–7 promotes giving such beverages to the perishing and wine to those whose lives are bitter as a coping mechanism against the likes of poverty and other troubles.

The biblical command to sanctify the Sabbath and other holidays has been interpreted as having three ceremonial meals with wine or grape juice, known as Kiddush. A number of Jewish marriage ceremonies end with the bride and groom drinking a shared cup of wine after reciting seven blessings; this occurs after a fasting day in some Ashkenazi traditions. It has been customary and in many cases even mandated to drink moderately so as to stay sober, and only after the prayers are over.

During the Seder on Passover, there is an obligation to drink four ceremonial cups of wine while reciting the Haggadah. It has been assumed to be the source of the wine-drinking ritual at communion in some Christian groups. During Purim, there is an obligation to become intoxicated; however, as with many other decrees, this has been avoided in many communities by allowing sleep during the day as a replacement.

During the U.S. Prohibition era in the 1920s, a rabbi from the Reform Judaism movement proposed using grape juice for the ritual instead of wine. Although refuted at first, the practice became widely accepted by orthodox Jews as well.

== Other animals ==
In the 1974 film Animals Are Beautiful People, an entire section was dedicated to showing many different animals, including monkeys, elephants, hogs, giraffes, and ostriches, eating over-ripe marula tree fruit, causing them to sway and lose their footing in a manner similar to human drunkenness. Birds may become intoxicated with fermented berries, and some die colliding with hard objects when flying under the influence.

In elephant warfare, practiced by the Greeks during the Maccabean revolt and by Hannibal during the Punic Wars, it has been recorded that the elephants would be given wine before the attack, and only then would they charge forward after being agitated by their driver.

It is a regular practice to give small amounts of beer to race horses in Ireland. Ruminant farm animals have natural fermentation occurring in their stomach, and adding small quantities of alcoholic beverages to their water is generally harmless and will not cause them to become drunk.

Alcoholic beverages are extremely harmful to dogs, and often for reasons of additives such as xylitol, an artificial sweetener in some mixers. Dogs can absorb ethyl alcohol in dangerous amounts through their skin as well as through drinking the liquid or consuming it in foods. Even fermenting bread dough can be dangerous to dogs. In 1999, one of the royal footmen for Britain's Queen Elizabeth II was demoted from Buckingham Palace due to his "party trick" of spiking the meals and drinks of the Queen's pet corgi dogs with alcohol which in turn would lead the dogs to run around drunk.

== See also ==
- A Night of Serious Drinking
- Alcohol enema
- Alcohol flush reaction
- Disulfiram-alcohol reaction
- Driving under the influence
- In vino veritas
- Long-term effects of alcohol consumption
- Low alcoholic drinks
- Short-term effects of alcohol consumption

== Bibliography ==
- Bales, Robert F. "Attitudes toward Drinking in the Irish Culture". In: Pittman, David J. and Snyder, Charles R. (Eds.) Society, Culture and Drinking Patterns. New York: Wiley, 1962, pp. 157–187.
- Gentry, Kenneth L. Jr., God Gave Wine: What the Bible Says about Alcohol. Lincoln, Calif.: Oakdown, 2001.
- Rorabaugh, W.J. "The Alcoholic Republic," Chapter 2 & 5, Oxford University Press.
- Sigmund, Paul. St. Thomas Aquinas on Politics and Ethics. W.W. Norton & Company, Inc, 1988, p. 77.
- Walton, Stuart. Out of It. A Cultural History of Intoxication. Penguin Books, 2002. ISBN 0-14-027977-6.
- Slingerland, Edward. Drunk: How We Sipped, Danced, and Stumbled Our Way to Civilization. Little, Brown Spark, 2021.
