= František Mořic Nágl =

Czech painter (1889–1944)

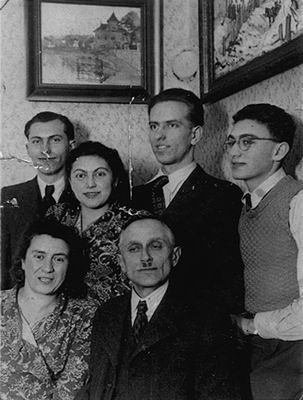
František Mořic Nágl and his family (1930s)

František Mořic Nágl (28 May 1889, Kostelní Myslová – October 1944, Auschwitz) was a Czech landscape and genre painter of Jewish ancestry. He and his entire family were murdered in the Holocaust.

== Biography ==
His family owned a farm and the local mill. He began his education in Telč. On the recommendation of his secondary school teachers, he was enrolled at the Academy of Arts, Architecture and Design in Prague, where he studied from 1905 to 1908. He then transferred to the Academy of Fine Arts and became a student of Hanuš Schwaiger. After graduating, he took up residence in Vienna.

During World War I, he was called up for service, fought on the Balkan Front, and was seriously wounded in the right shoulder. Following surgery, he was able to recover the use of his hand, but always required a prop to hold up his arm.

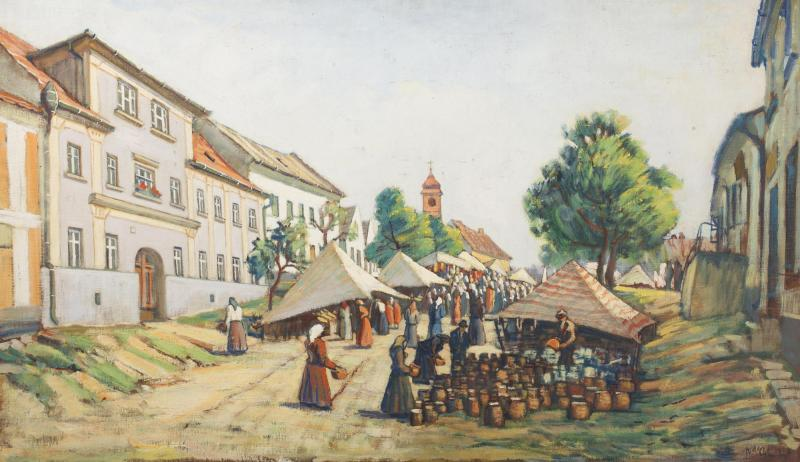
The Market at Návsí

Despite this, he was determined to continue painting but, as the only son, his ailing father wanted him to take over the family farm. Nágl deferred to his father's wishes and settled into a farmer's life.

He still made time for painting, however, and was able to participate in an exhibition at the Rudolfinum not long after. In 1920, he married a violinist named Vlasta Nettelová. He drew his inspiration from the countryside and village life and his reputation as a "peasant painter" increased during the 1920s and 1930s. This led to major exhibitions in Brno in 1933 and Ostrava in 1937.

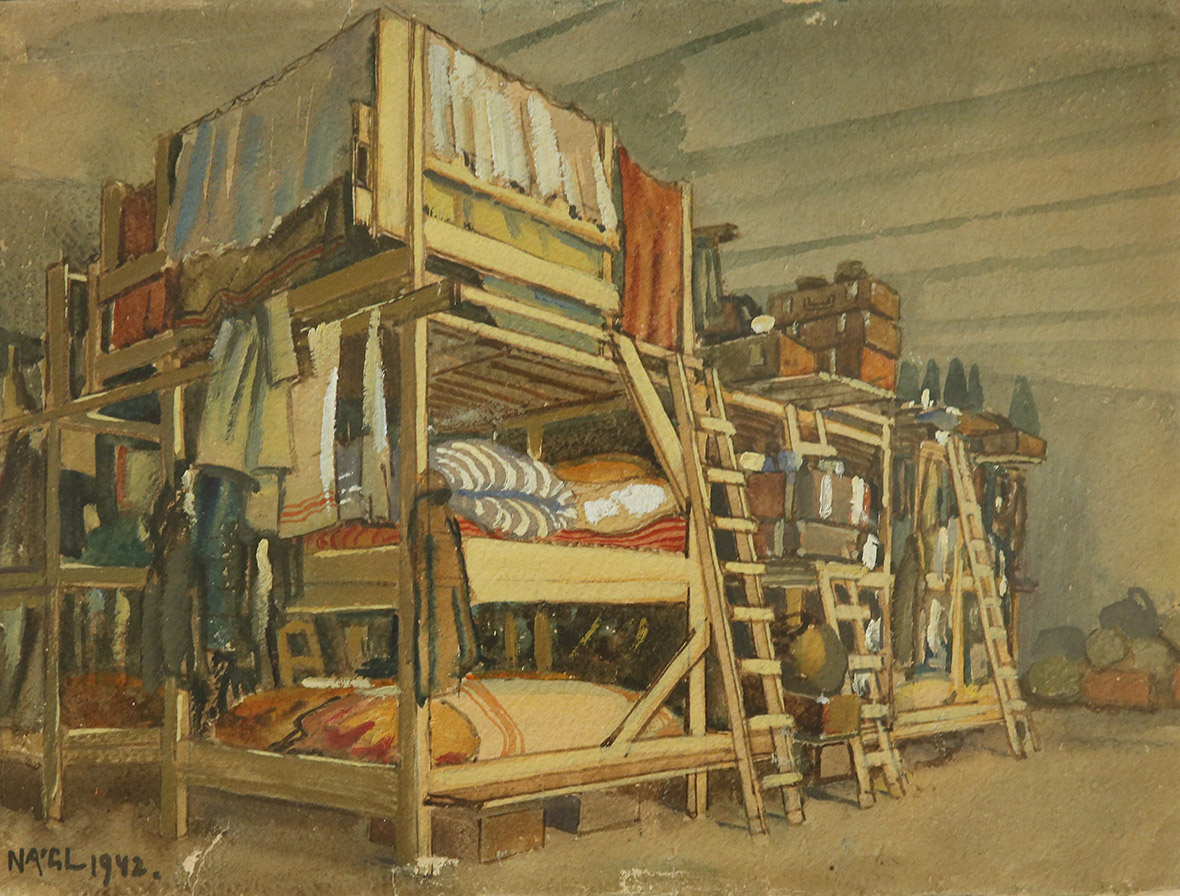
Living Quarters at Theresienstadt

In 1939, he and his family were evicted from the farm and their property was seized. For two years, they rented an apartment in Telč then, in 1941, he was arrested by the Gestapo while working at his easel in the town square. He was imprisoned in Brno until May, 1942, when his entire family was transported to Theresienstadt. Later, they were transferred to Auschwitz, where they were all murdered over the course of two years.

During his time at Theresienstadt, he continued to create drawings and watercolors, but no one knew of their existence until 1950, when they were discovered in the bricked-up attic of a house that was undergoing reconstruction. A year later, they were presented at a major exhibition sponsored by the Mánes Union of Fine Arts. Exhibitions have also been held in Telč and Prague. A plaque in his honor has been placed where he was arrested in the Telč town square.
