= Adolf Kašpar =

Czech painter and illustrator

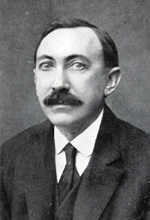
Adolf Kašpar (before 1934)

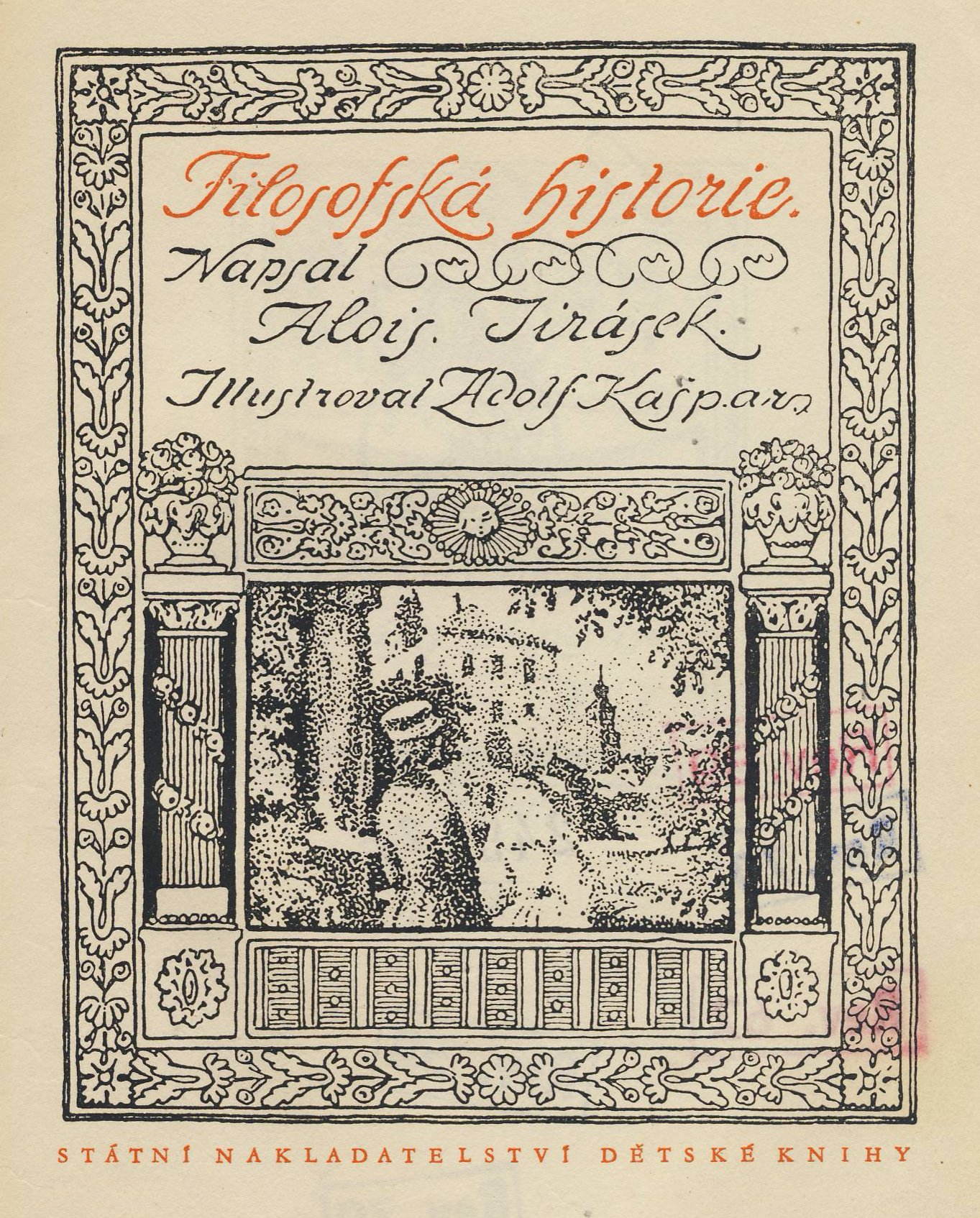
Title page of the book Filosofská historie, 27th edition

Adolf Kašpar (27 December 1877 – 29 June 1934) was a Czech painter and illustrator.

== Life ==
Kašpar was born on 27 December 1877 in Bludov. The son of a general wares dealer, Kašpar studied at Prague Academy under Maxmilián Pirner.

His mentor was Hanus Schwaiger, a famous Czech painter and children's book illustrator. Schwaiger recommended Kašpar to the academy and exerted much influence over his life and art.

In 1907, Kašpar married to Jitka Řepková in Velehrad.

Kašpar died on 29 June 1934 in Železná Ruda.

== Works ==
Kašpar perfected his pieces by collecting information from Czech literature. He became famous by illustrating The Grandmother (Czech: Babička), a book by the Czech author Božena Němcová. His illustrations can also be found in other works by Alois Jirásek, Jan Neruda, Karel Václav Rais and František Ladislav Čelakovský. During this time, he also worked as graphic artist and made watercolors and pictures of his birthplace.

== Honours ==
In Loštice is the Adolf Kašpar Memorial. The memorial is situated in the house where Kašpar used to spend summers with his family from 1911 to 1932. The artist's family and friends helped to assemble his masterpieces for the memorial's art collection.
