= Josef Šíma =

Czech painter (1891–1971)

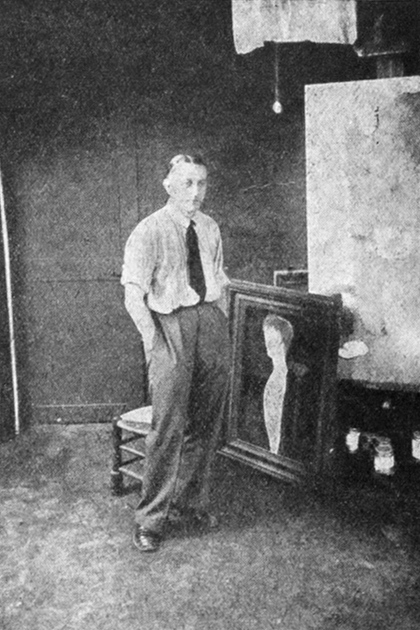
Josef Šíma in his studio in Paris, c. 1929

Josef Šíma (18 March 1891 – 24 July 1971) was a Czech modernist painter.

== Biography ==
After graduating from Academy of Arts in Prague, where he was a student of Jan Preisler, Šíma was involved in the Devětsil movement and in the artists' forum Umělecká beseda in Prague before travelling to Paris in 1921. He became a French citizen in 1926. He was the artistic director for the journal Le Grand Jeu in 1929 and a friend of the French poets René Daumal, Roger Gilbert-Lecomte, and Roger Vailland.

== Style ==
Šíma's sources of inspiration ranged from sensual experience, through civil themes, geometric abstraction, imaginative seeking of archetypes of nature, objects, and human existence pictured as crystals, a cosmic egg, and female torsos, to fascination with landscapes and mythology, until he finally united all these elements and created a synthesis of them in cosmic visions and symbols of human destiny.

He exhibited at Documenta 2 in 1959. He also illustrated many books, made book covers and scenic paintings, and designed stained glass windows (e.g., for Saint James's Church in Reims).
