= Kostelní Myslová =

- Municipality
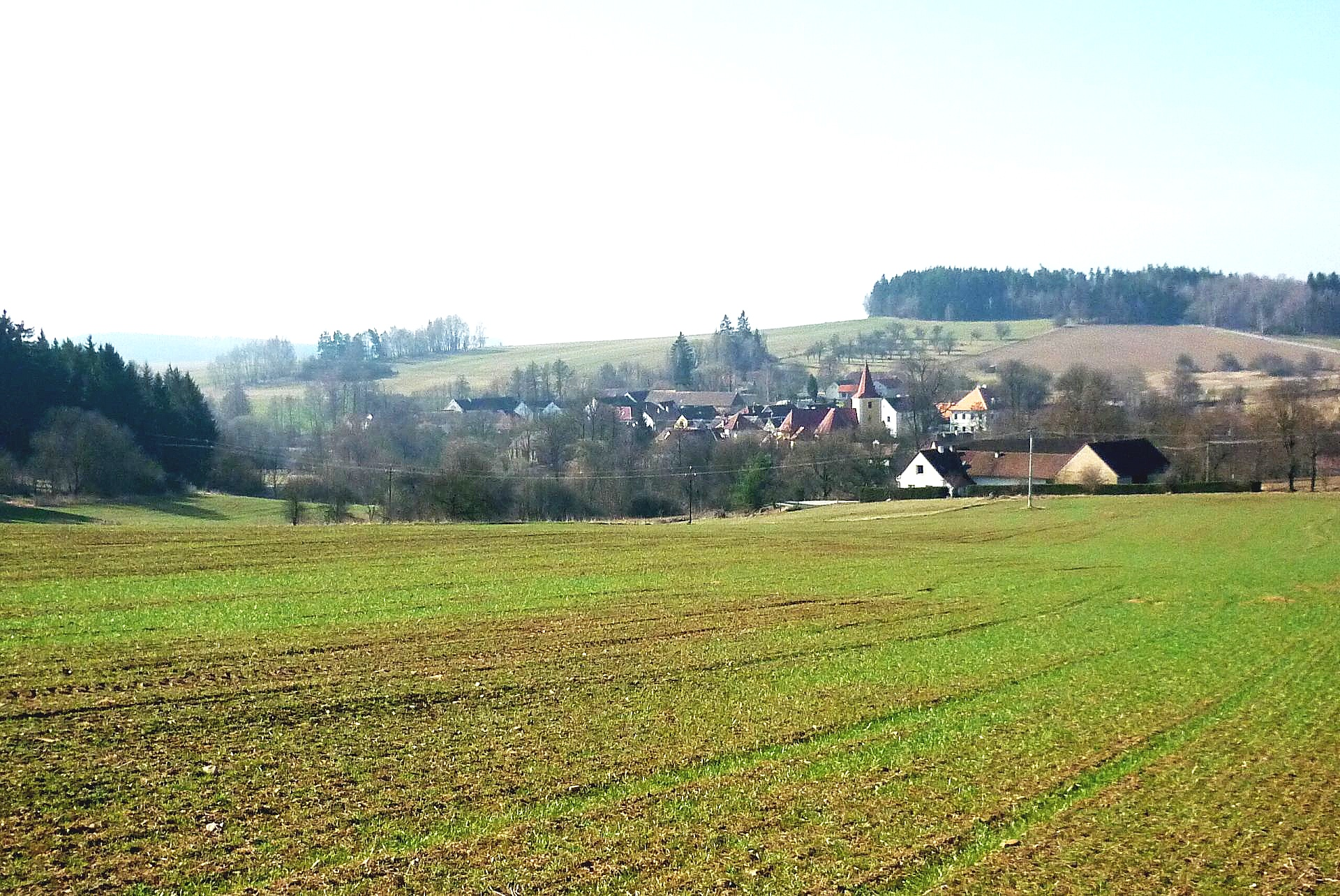
- View from the north

- Flag Coat of arms

- Location in the Czech Republic
- Coordinates: 49°8′52″N 15°25′44″E
- Country: Czech Republic
- Region: Vysočina
- District: Jihlava
- First mentioned: 1253

Area
  - Total: 5.12 km^{2} (1.98 sq mi)
- Elevation: 490 m (1,610 ft)

Population (2026-01-01)
  - Total: 92
  - Density: 18/km^{2} (47/sq mi)
- Time zone: UTC+1 (CET)
  - Summer (DST): UTC+2 (CEST)
- Postal code: 588 56
- Website: kostelnimyslova.cz

Kostelní Myslová (Czech pronunciation: [ˈkostɛlɲiː ˈmɪslovaː]; German: Kirch Mislau) is a municipality and village in Jihlava District in the Vysočina Region of the Czech Republic. It has about 90 inhabitants.

== Geography ==
Kostelní Myslová is located about 30 kilometres (19 mi) south of Jihlava. It lies mostly in the Křižanov Highlands, only the western part of the municipal territory extends into the Javořice Highlands. The highest point is near the top of the hill Buzový at 569 m (1,867 ft) above sea level. The Myslůvka Stream flows through the municipality. The territory is rich in fishponds, fed by the Myslůvka and its tributary Strouha.

=== Climate ===
Climate data for Kostelní Myslová (1991–2020)
Month	Jan	Feb	Mar	Apr	May	Jun	Jul	Aug	Sep	Oct	Nov	Dec	Year
Record high °C (°F)	16.3 (61.3)	15.9 (60.6)	21.0 (69.8)	26.7 (80.1)	30.7 (87.3)	33.4 (92.1)	35.6 (96.1)	36.7 (98.1)	32.8 (91.0)	25.2 (77.4)	18.0 (64.4)	13.7 (56.7)	36.7 (98.1)
Mean daily maximum °C (°F)	0.8 (33.4)	2.9 (37.2)	7.7 (45.9)	13.8 (56.8)	18.1 (64.6)	21.8 (71.2)	24.1 (75.4)	24.2 (75.6)	18.3 (64.9)	12.0 (53.6)	5.6 (42.1)	1.3 (34.3)	12.6 (54.7)
Daily mean °C (°F)	−2.0 (28.4)	−0.8 (30.6)	2.9 (37.2)	8.2 (46.8)	12.8 (55.0)	16.4 (61.5)	18.2 (64.8)	18.0 (64.4)	13.0 (55.4)	7.9 (46.2)	2.9 (37.2)	−1.1 (30.0)	8.0 (46.4)
Mean daily minimum °C (°F)	−4.7 (23.5)	−4.0 (24.8)	−0.8 (30.6)	3.3 (37.9)	7.7 (45.9)	11.0 (51.8)	12.7 (54.9)	12.6 (54.7)	8.8 (47.8)	4.6 (40.3)	0.5 (32.9)	−3.5 (25.7)	4.0 (39.2)
Record low °C (°F)	−21.8 (−7.2)	−20.6 (−5.1)	−16.4 (2.5)	−9.2 (15.4)	−3.3 (26.1)	0.5 (32.9)	5.0 (41.0)	4.4 (39.9)	−1.8 (28.8)	−7.3 (18.9)	−11.3 (11.7)	−20.1 (−4.2)	−21.8 (−7.2)
Average precipitation mm (inches)	42.3 (1.67)	31.1 (1.22)	44.5 (1.75)	31.1 (1.22)	62.9 (2.48)	70.6 (2.78)	80.7 (3.18)	76.2 (3.00)	51.9 (2.04)	41.2 (1.62)	40.4 (1.59)	39.0 (1.54)	611.7 (24.08)
Average precipitation days (≥ 1.0 mm)	9.2	7.6	9.3	7.0	9.3	9.6	10.3	8.6	7.6	7.7	8.3	9.4	103.8
Mean monthly sunshine hours	55.8	86.6	131.4	192.1	219.5	228.2	241.6	236.0	163.5	106.7	46.2	44.1	1,751.5
Source: NOAA

== History ==
The first written mention of Kostelní Myslová is from 1253.

== Demographics ==
Historical population

Year	Pop.	±%
1869	239	—
1880	264	+10.5%
1890	268	+1.5%
1900	265	−1.1%
1910	241	−9.1%

Year	Pop.	±%
1921	247	+2.5%
1930	236	−4.5%
1950	141	−40.3%
1961	122	−13.5%
1970	127	+4.1%

Year	Pop.	±%
1980	100	−21.3%
1991	69	−31.0%
2001	68	−1.4%
2011	63	−7.4%
2021	73	+15.9%

Source: Censuses

== Transport ==
There are no railways or major roads passing through the municipality.

== Sights ==
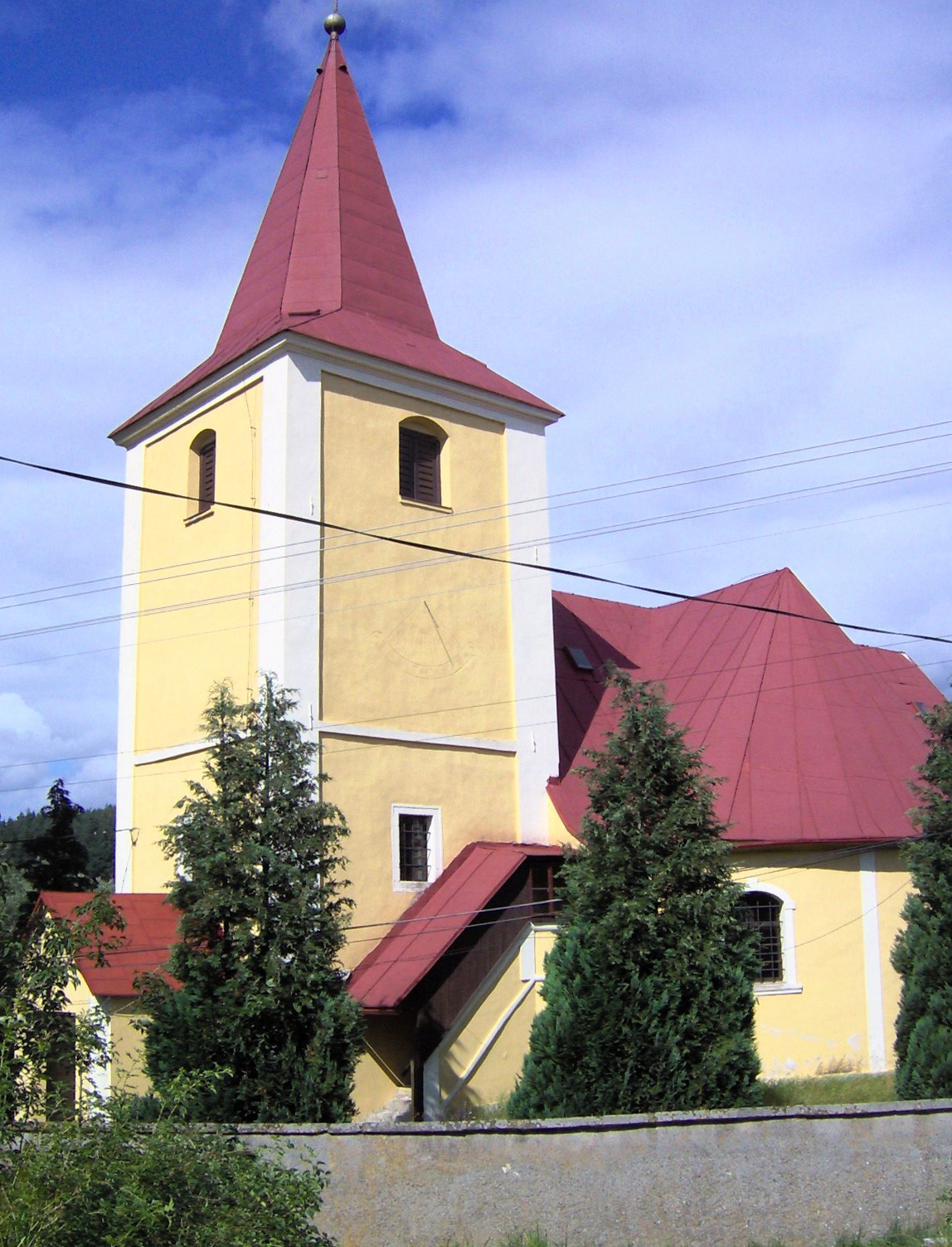
Church of Saint Wenceslaus

The main landmark of Kostelní Myslová is the Church of Saint Wenceslaus. It is a Baroque cemetery church built in 1795, but it has a Romanesque core from around 1253.

A cultural monument and the oldest house in the village is the Baroque rectory from 1785. Today there is an exhibition called Genius Loci, which presents the history of the village.

== Notable people ==
- František Mořic Nágl (1889–1944), painter
