= Roger Gilbert-Lecomte =

Roger Gilbert-Lecomte (18 May 1907 in Reims, France – 31 December 1943 in Paris) was a French avant-garde poet and co-founder (with René Daumal, Roger Vailland and Josef Šíma) of the artistic group and magazine Le Grand Jeu. The group, associated with surrealists, was "excommunicated" from the movement by André Breton. Gilbert-Lecomte used drugs, in particular morphine, for both artistic and sociological reasons. As was predicted in his poetry, his death was the result of an infection caused by the use of dirty hypodermic needles.

"Coma Crossing: Collected Poems", Schism Books, 2019, is the most comprehensive bilingual anthology of his poetry and "Theory of the Great Game" (Atlas Books, 2015) gives a hefty selection of his prose, along with that of René Daumal and other members of "Le Grand Jeu."

== Bibliography ==
- Le grand jeu (nos 1, 2, et 3)
- Testament (1955)
- Sacre et massacre de l'amour (1960)
- Tétanos mystique (1972)
- Lettres à Benjamin Fondane (1985)
- Monsieur Morphée empoisonneur public (1966)
- Correspondance (1971)
- Arthur Rimbaud (1971)
- L'horrible révélation… la seule (1973)
- Œuvres complètes, 2 volumes (1974–1977)
- Caves en plein ciel (1977)
- Neuf haï kaï (1977)
- Poèmes et chroniques retrouvés (1982)
- Mes chers petits éternels (1992)
- La vie, l'amour, la mort, le vide et le vent
- Joseph Sima (2000)
- Le miroir noir
- Black Mirror: The Selected Poems of Roger Gilbert-Lecomte (Station Hill Press, 1991)
- The Book is a Ghost: Thoughts and Paroxysms for going Beyond (Solar▲Luxuriance, 2015)
- 'Coma Crossing: Collected Poems' (Schism Books, 2019)
