= Mount Analogue =

1952 novel by René Daumal

Mount Analogue: A Novel of Symbolically Authentic Non-Euclidean Adventures in Mountain Climbing
- First English-language edition
- Author: René Daumal
- Original title: Le Mont Analogue. Roman d'aventures alpines, non euclidiennes et symboliquement authentiques
- Language: French
- Genre: fantasy
- Publisher: Vincent Stuart Ltd. (Eng. trans.)
- Publication date: 1952
- Publication place: France
- English publication date: 1959
- Media type: Print (Hardback & Paperback)
- Pages: 106 p. (hardback edition)
- ISBN: 0-87773-850-5
- OCLC: 25747666
- Dewey Decimal: 843/.912 20
- LC Class: PQ2607.A86 M613 1992

Mount Analogue: A Novel of Symbolically Authentic Non-Euclidean Adventures in Mountain Climbing is a classic allegorical adventure novel by the early 20th-century French novelist René Daumal. The novel describes an expedition undertaken by a group of mountaineers to travel to and climb the titular Mount Analogue, an enormous mountain on a surreal continent which is invisible and inaccessible to the outside world, and which can only be perceived by the application of obscure knowledge. The central theme of mountaineering is extensively explored through literary and philosophical lenses.

Daumal died before the novel was completed, providing an uncanny one-way quality to the story, which ends abruptly in the middle of a sentence. The remnants of the unfinished story were first published posthumously in French in 1952, and the first English translation was published by Vincent Stuart Ltd. in 1959.

== Overview ==
The novel is both bizarre and allegorical, detailing the discovery and ascent of a mountain which can only be perceived by realising that one has travelled further in traversing it than one would by travelling in a straight line. Father Sogol – "Logos" spelled backwards – is the leader of the expedition to climb the mysterious mountain, which is believed to unite Heaven and Earth. Sogol invites the narrator to join the expedition, along with various other specialists, including scientists, artists, philosophers, and writers. He explains that he inferred the existence of the massive mountain from the general balance of Earth's gravitational field despite the apparently uneven distribution of landmasses on its surface – determining that its geographical location is somewhere in the South Pacific. Because no such landmass seems to exist in nautical charts of the region, Sogol determines that the mountain must exist on a hidden continent made entirely imperceptible to the rest of the world by the gravitational anomaly caused by the mountain's mass, which bends light and all other signals around it. The continent can only be perceived or accessed in any way from a precise location when rays of sunlight hit the earth at a certain angle.

"Its summit must be inaccessible, but its base accessible to human beings as nature made them. It must be unique and it must exist geographically. The door to the invisible must be visible."

Sogol and the others then undertake a voyage to the hidden continent, where they discover various populations of humans living in harmony, completely unknown to the outside world – these people are the descendants of historical explorers who had also inferred the continent's existence and traveled there. The native flora and fauna include many bizarre creatures unknown elsewhere on the planet, and the local economy operates largely to serve the ambitions of mountaineers intent on climbing the mountain. Climbers are required to adhere to a complex system of rules and regulations involving professional guides, porters, and a network of camps, and are punished severely for causing any disturbance to the mountain's delicate ecology.

The book was one of the sources of the cult film The Holy Mountain by Alejandro Jodorowsky. The novel also marks the first use of the word "peradam" in literature, an object that is revealed only to those who seek it.

"One finds here, very rarely in the low lying areas, more frequently as one goes farther up, a clear and extremely hard stone that is spherical and varies in size—a kind of crystal, but a curved crystal, something extraordinary and unknown on the rest of the planet. Among the French of Port-des-Singes, it is called peradam. Ivan Lapse remains puzzled by the formation and root meaning of this word. It may mean, according to him, "harder than diamond," and it is; or "father of the diamond," and they say that the diamond is in fact the product of the degeneration of the peradam by a sort of quartering of the circle or, more precisely, cubing of the sphere. Or again, the word may mean "Adam's stone," having some secret and profound connection to the original nature of man. The clarity of this stone is so great and its index of refraction so close to that of air that, despite the crystal's great density, the unaccustomed eye hardly perceives it. But to anyone who seeks it with sincere desire and true need, it reveals itself by its sudden sparkle, like that of dewdrops. The peradam is the only substance, the only material object whose value is recognized by the guides of Mount Analogue. Therefore, it is the standard of all currency, as gold is for us."

In the author's notes accompanying the novel, Daumal compares art and alpinism, saying:

Alpinism is the art of climbing mountains by confronting the greatest dangers with the greatest prudence. Art is used here to mean the accomplishment of knowledge in action.

You cannot always stay on the summits. You have to come down again...

So what's the point? Only this: what is above knows what is below, what is below does not know what is above. While climbing, take note of all the difficulties along your path. During the descent, you will no longer see them, but you will know that they are there if you have observed carefully.

There is an art to finding your way in the lower regions by the memory of what you have seen when you were higher up. When you can no longer see, you can at least still know. . .

Some of the paintings of the Spanish-Mexican painter Remedios Varo were used in the illustrations for the first edition of the novel, such as Embroidering the Earth's Mantle and The Ascension of Mount Analog. The Australian artist Imants Tillers created his own version of Mount Analog without having knowledge of Varo's previous work.

== Adaptations ==
- Dr. William J. Welch, a personal friend of Daumal's spiritual teacher Gurdjieff, performed a radio presentation of Mount Analogue later in his life.
- The 1973 fantasy adventure film The Holy Mountain directed by Alejandro Jodorowsky is partially based on this novel.
- Daniel Pinkwater, an American novelist, mentions Mount Analogue in his young adult book Lizard Music.
- John Zorn recorded an album of the same name inspired by the book and the teachings of Gurdjieff.
- Irish artists Walker and Walker produced a short film based on the book entitled Mount Analogue Revisited in 2010 which was used as part of a 2012 installation in the Hugh Lane Gallery, Dublin.
- German Engineer, Alpinist and Religious Scholar - Arthur Gerard Michael Baron von Boennighausen continued the story started by Daumal.
- Ruth Ozeki mentions Mount Analogue in Appendix D of her 2013 novel A Tale for the Time Being.
- The title track of the studio album Prati Bagnati del Monte Analogo by Italian composer Francesco Messina was inspired by the novel.
- Soundwalk Collective's and Patti Smith's album Peradam (2020), besides from borrowing its title from Daumal's novel, alludes to peradam and Mount Analogue.
