= Lešany (Prostějov District) =

- Municipality
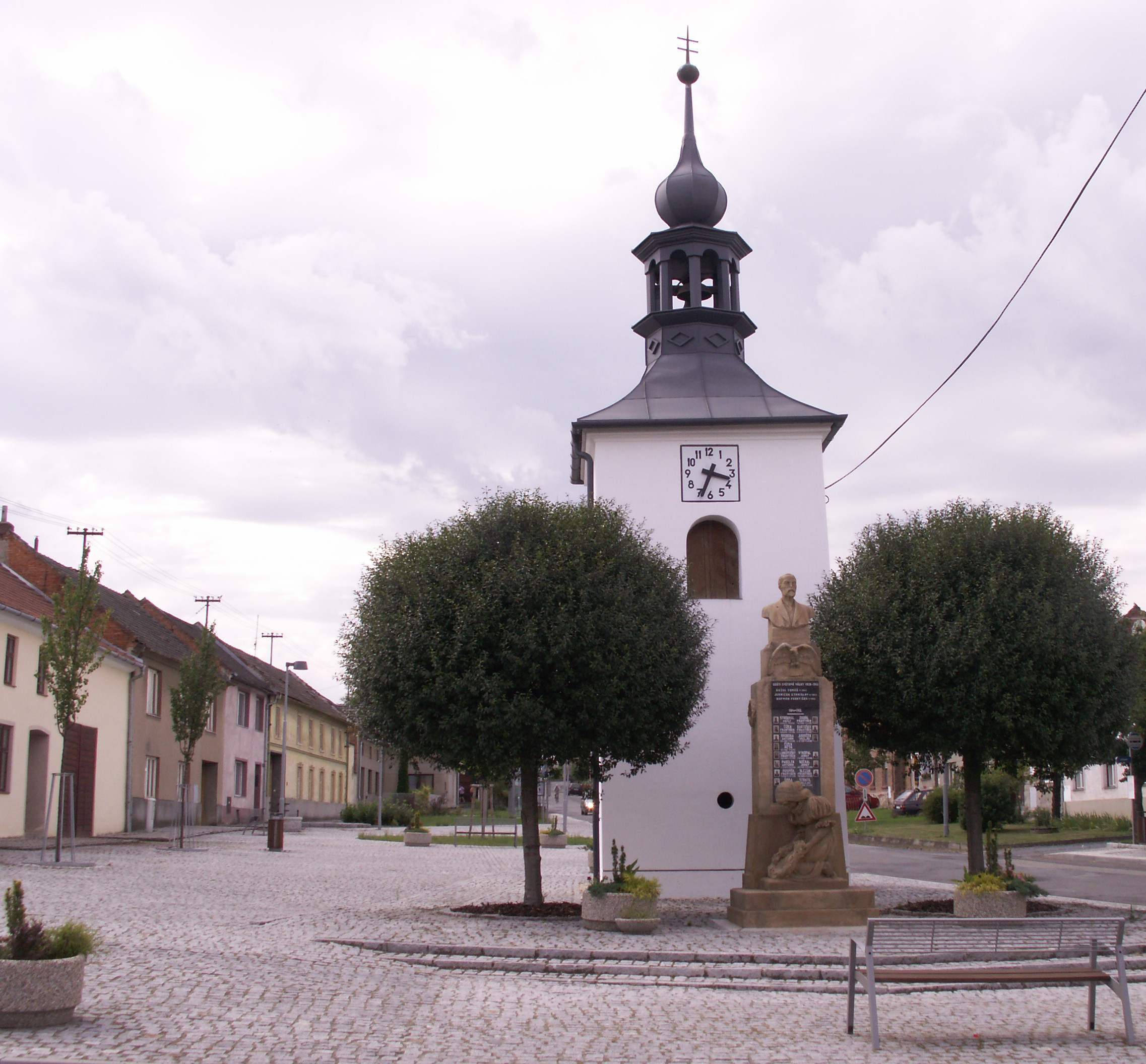
- Centre of Lešany

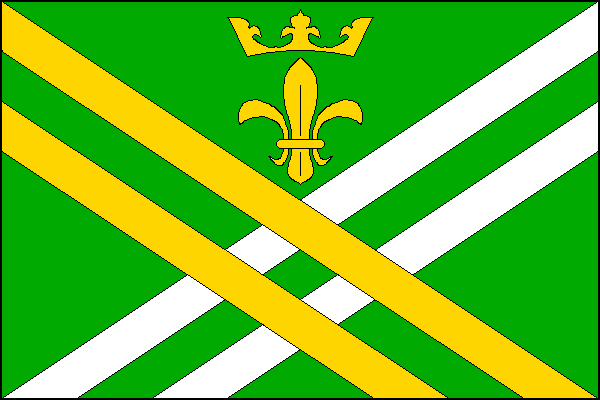
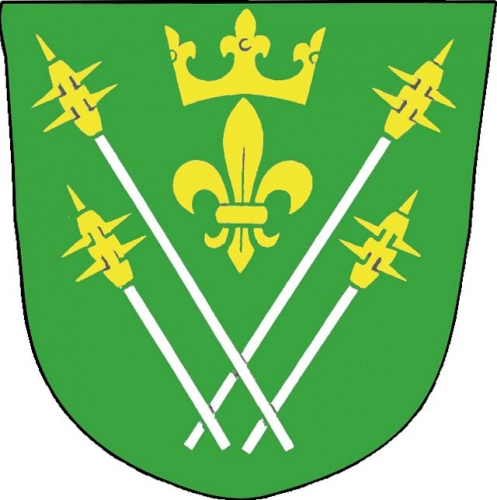
- Flag Coat of arms

- Location in the Czech Republic
- Coordinates: 49°29′59″N 17°1′27″E
- Country: Czech Republic
- Region: Olomouc
- District: Prostějov
- First mentioned: 1215

Area
  - Total: 5.50 km^{2} (2.12 sq mi)
- Elevation: 266 m (873 ft)

Population (2026-01-01)
  - Total: 401
  - Density: 72.9/km^{2} (189/sq mi)
- Time zone: UTC+1 (CET)
  - Summer (DST): UTC+2 (CEST)
- Postal code: 798 42
- Website: www.obeclesany.cz

Lešany is a municipality and village in Prostějov District in the Olomouc Region of the Czech Republic. It has about 400 inhabitants.

Lešany lies approximately 8 kilometres (5 mi) north-west of Prostějov, 20 km (12 mi) south-west of Olomouc, and 198 km (123 mi) east of Prague.

== Demographics ==
Historical population
Year	Pop.	±%
1869	560	—
1880	621	+10.9%
1890	653	+5.2%
1900	660	+1.1%
1910	647	−2.0%
1921	624	−3.6%
1930	595	−4.6%
1950	436	−26.7%
1961	475	+8.9%
1970	485	+2.1%
1980	461	−4.9%
1991	373	−19.1%
2001	367	−1.6%
2011	389	+6.0%
2021	353	−9.3%
Source: Censuses

== Notable people ==
- Bohuš Čížek (1913–1989), painter
