= Oldřich Blažíček =

Czech painter

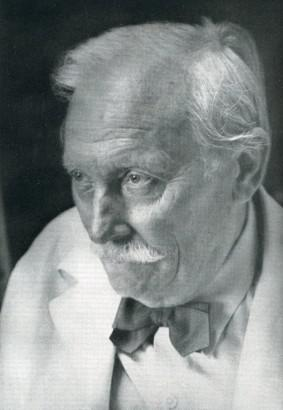
Oldřich Blažíček

Oldřich Blažíček (5 January 1887 in Slavkovice, Nové Město na Moravě – 3 May 1953 in Prague) was a Czech painter, representative of modern landscape paintings.

He came from very humble beginnings. His father was a rural tailor. He apprenticed with his brother at a house as a painter and then went to Prague for work. He passed after four years at the Academy, where he graduated under Hanus Schwaiger. There he became acquainted with many colleagues, many notable figures such as Otto Gutfreund, Jan Štursa, Rudolf Kremlička, Josef Čapek, and many others. He, however, to any creative group entered.

Aside from being a noted landscape painter of his native Bohemian-Moravian Highlands, he was also famous for painting church interiors which brought him major success. His early painting of St Vitus Cathedral for instance was widely acclaimed by the Academy. He became a professor of painting at the CTU, where he worked until 1927 to 1948. Already in 1913, he had participated in exhibitions of the Union of Artists in Poznań and Ljubljana, followed by many others. He was awarded in Paris in 1921.

He died on 3 May 1953 in Prague. He wrote his memoirs in the book Mládí na Vysočině (Youth in the Highlands).

== Works ==
- Pvní jarní den - 1928
- U selského dvora - 1926
- Na večer v předjaří - 1925
- Doba velikonoční - 1930
- Na samotínku - 1928
- Rybníček ve Slavíkově - 1927

== See also ==
- List of Czech painters
