= A Night of Serious Drinking =

Book by René Daumal

- Author: René Daumal
- Original title: La grande beuverie
- Language: French
- Publication date: 1938
- Publication place: France

A Night of Serious Drinking (French: La Grande Beuverie) is an allegorical novel, published 1938, by the French surrealist writer René Daumal. It was translated into English in 1979 by David Coward and E.A. Lovatt. In 2003 Overlook press published a new edition with an index and a scholarly introduction.

== Plot summary ==
An unnamed narrator spends an evening getting drunk with a group of friends. As the party becomes intoxicated and exuberant, the narrator seemingly begins a journey that ranges from apparent paradises to hell. The fantastic world depicted in A Night of Serious Drinking is actually the ordinary world distorted and satirized. Various characters are termed Anthographers, Fabricators of useless objects, Scienters, Nibblists, Clarificators, and other absurd titles. Yet the inhabitants of these strange realms are only too familiar: scientists dissecting an animal in their laboratory, a wise man surrounded by his devotees, politicians, poets expounding their rhetoric. These characters perform humorous antics and intellectual games, which they consider to be attempts to find meaning.

In the second half of the book there is an early description of a linguistic strange loop (a set of verbal references which seem to repeat conceptually) which the character terms a "Taglufon."
