= Hanuš Schwaiger =

Czech painter, designer, graphic artist and professor

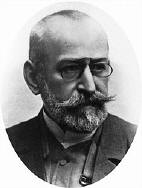
- Born: 28 June 1854; Jindřichův Hradec, Bohemia, Austrian Empire
- Died: 17 June 1912 (aged 57); Prague, Austria-Hungary
- Education: Academy of Fine Arts Vienna; Vienna Business School

Hanuš Johann Peter Paul Schwaiger (28 June 1854 – 17 June 1912) was a painter, designer, graphic artist and professor, best known for his fairy-tale illustrations. He was from Bohemia.

== Biography ==
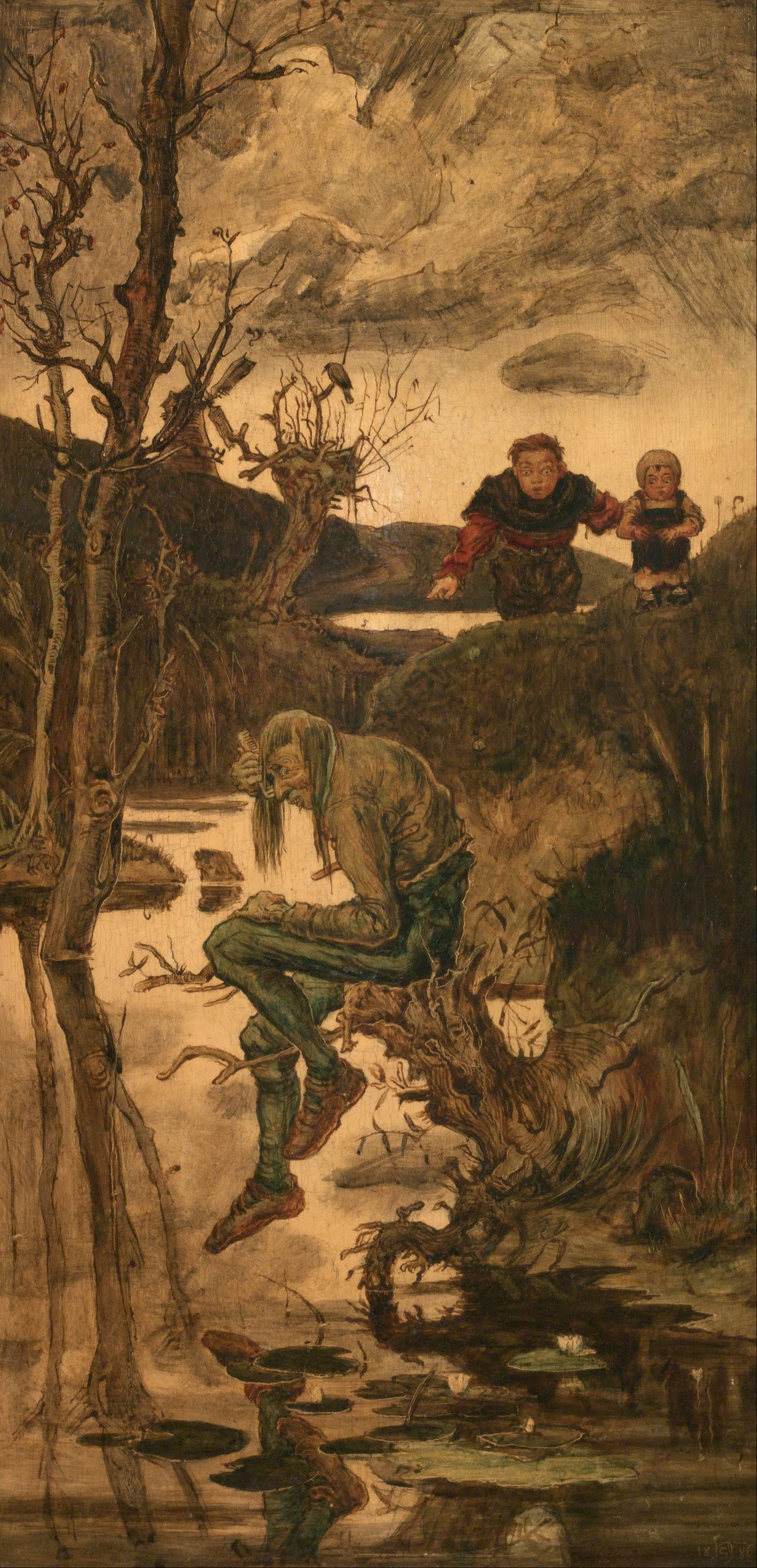
The Water Gnome (1886)

He was the only son of six children born to a German-speaking ironmonger, and was baptized as a Catholic. In 1865, he was enrolled at the local gymnasium, but failed his courses and transferred to the Realschule in České Budějovice, where he met a teacher who encouraged his artistic interests. In 1873, despite this, he followed his father's wishes and entered the Vienna Business School. He soon ignored his studies and spent more time at the local art schools, prompting his parents to bring him home to work in the family business. He was not deterred, however, and devoted his time to painting when his father was absent.

Going against his family, he returned to Vienna in 1874 and audited classes at the Academy of Fine Arts. After further clashes with his father, he finally prevailed and was given the money to enroll. Carl Wurzinger and Josef Matyáš Trenkwald were among his instructors there. Some of his first works were purchased by Professor Hans Makart, but later attempts to be financially independent failed and he returned, penniless, to his hometown in 1881. Eventually, he found work as an illustrator and was able to visit the Netherlands in 1888, where he became interested in Dutch architecture and softened his painting style.

The following year, Joža Uprka invited him to visit Moravian Slovakia. During his stay there, in Hroznová Lhota, he married a local schoolteacher. He had to leave, in 1891, apparently because he was being pursued by creditors and, on his wife's suggestion, moved to Bystřice pod Hostýnem where they lived in a forester's house, courtesy of Baron von Loudon. In 1896, they were able to travel to Belgium, the Netherlands and Italy, where he received a commission to copy the frescoes at the Monastery of the Madonna of Lourdes in Verona.

== Teaching career ==
In 1899, he accepted a teaching position at the newly opened Brno University of Technology, but was not pleased, as the work involved simple technical drawing, rather than art. To make matters worse, his creditors tracked him down again and he was able to avert legal action only by receiving financial assistance from the poet, Josef Svatopluk Machar. Shortly after, he was awarded a commission by the Thonet brothers. He painted six watercolors, depicting life in their factory, which were exhibited at the Exposition Universelle (1900). He also created some popular tapestry designs for the Moravská gobelínová manufaktura.

Two years later, he returned to Prague and was named a Professor at the Academy of Fine Arts. His students there included Otakar Kubín, Václav Rabas, Rudolf Kremlička, František Antonín Jelínek, Oldřich Blažíček, Josef Tříška and František Mořic Nágl.

In 1906, he developed a tumor on his tongue. He underwent a successful surgery in the Netherlands but, after a few years, the tumor returned. After several more surgeries, it was decided to remove his tongue entirely, and he died of complications not long after.

His home in Prague, the "Villa Tara", was declared a national landmark in 1921 and currently serves as a hotel.

== Selected works ==
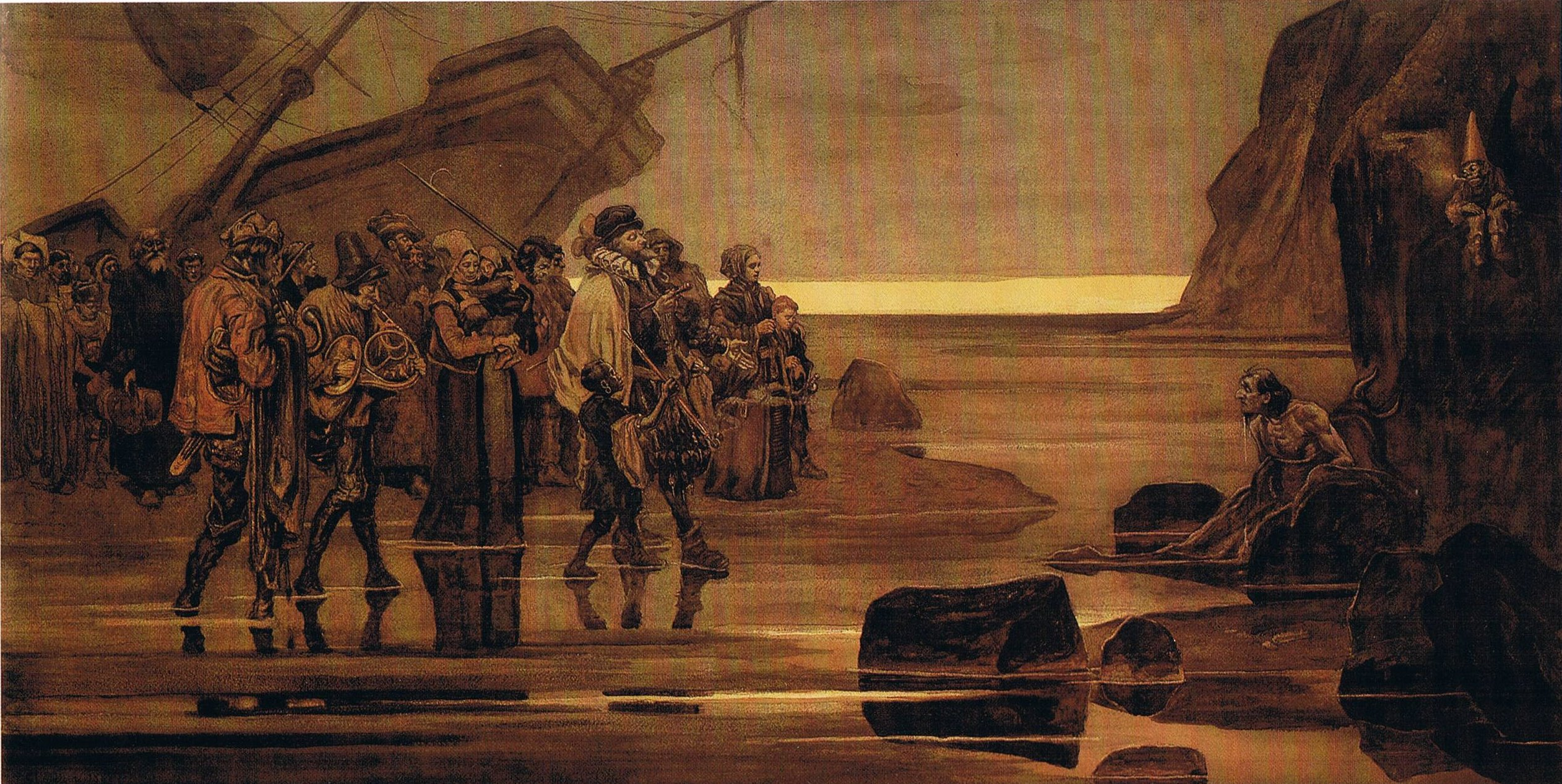
The Cave of Steenfoll, for a story by Wilhelm Hauff,
based on a Scottish legend

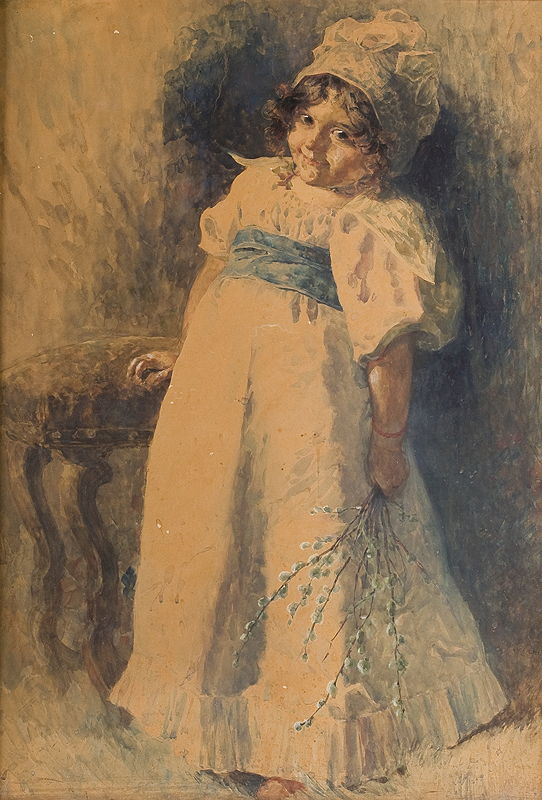
Alenka

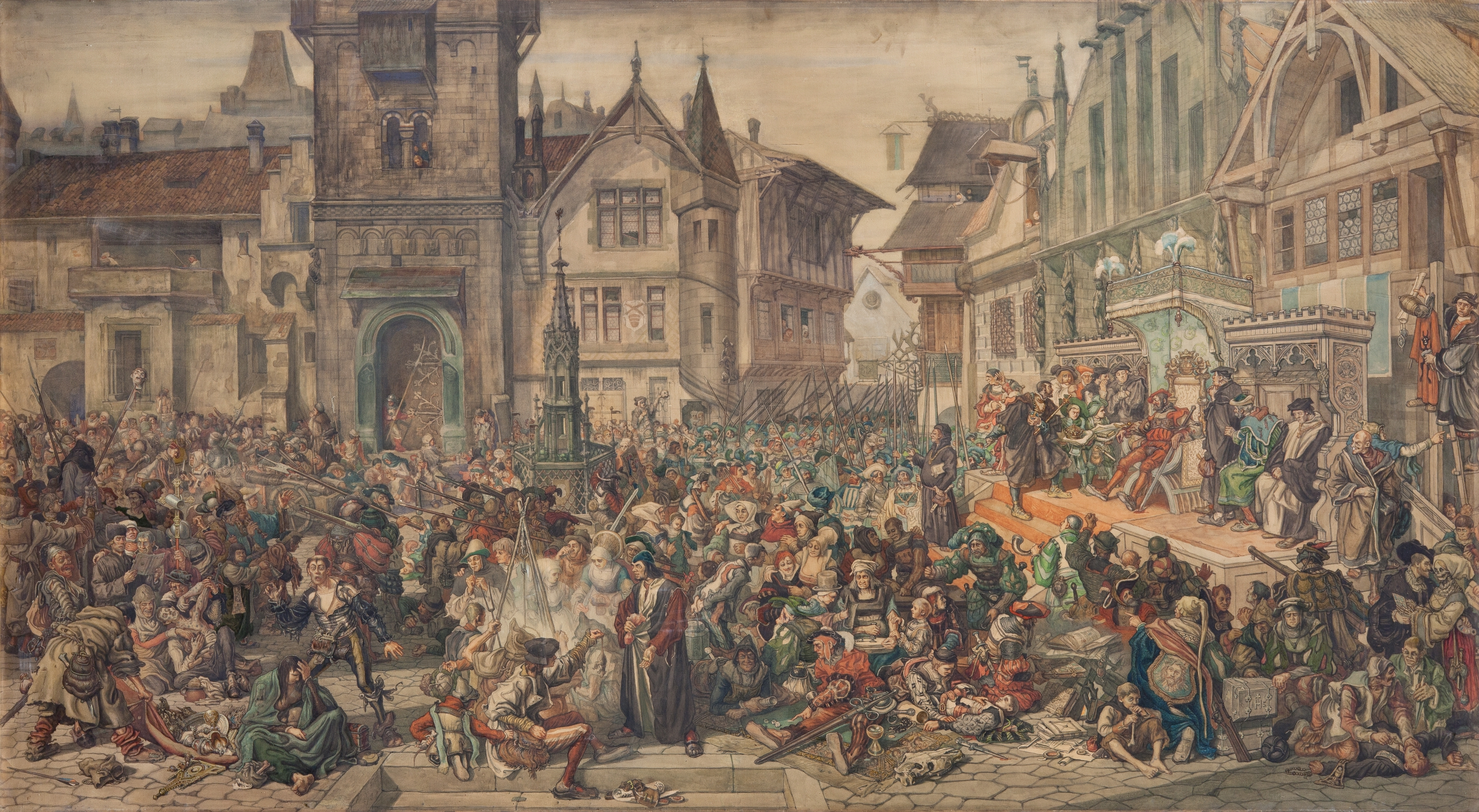
Anabaptists in Münster (1886), Collection of the
National Gallery in Prague
