= René Daumal =

French poet and novelist

- Born: 16 March 1908; Boulzicourt, Ardennes, France
- Died: 21 May 1944 (aged 36); Paris, France
- Occupations: Para-surrealist writer, poet
- Known for: Mount Analogue (1952)

Signature
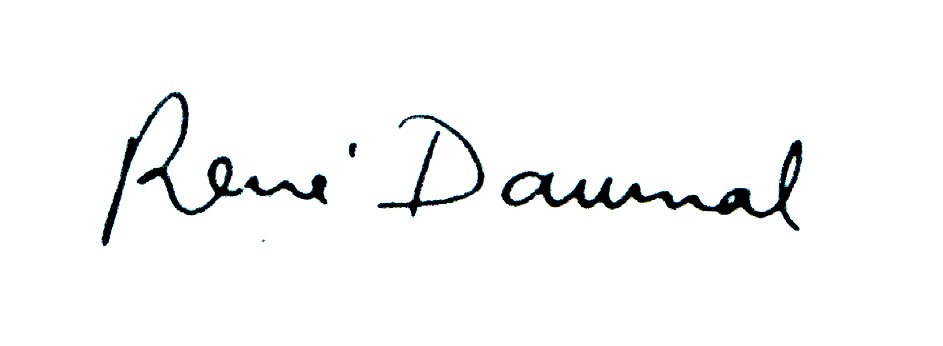

René Daumal (French: [domal]; 16 March 1908 – 21 May 1944) was a French spiritual para-surrealist writer, critic and poet, best known for his posthumously published novel Mount Analogue (1952) as well as for being an early, outspoken practitioner of pataphysics.

== Biography ==
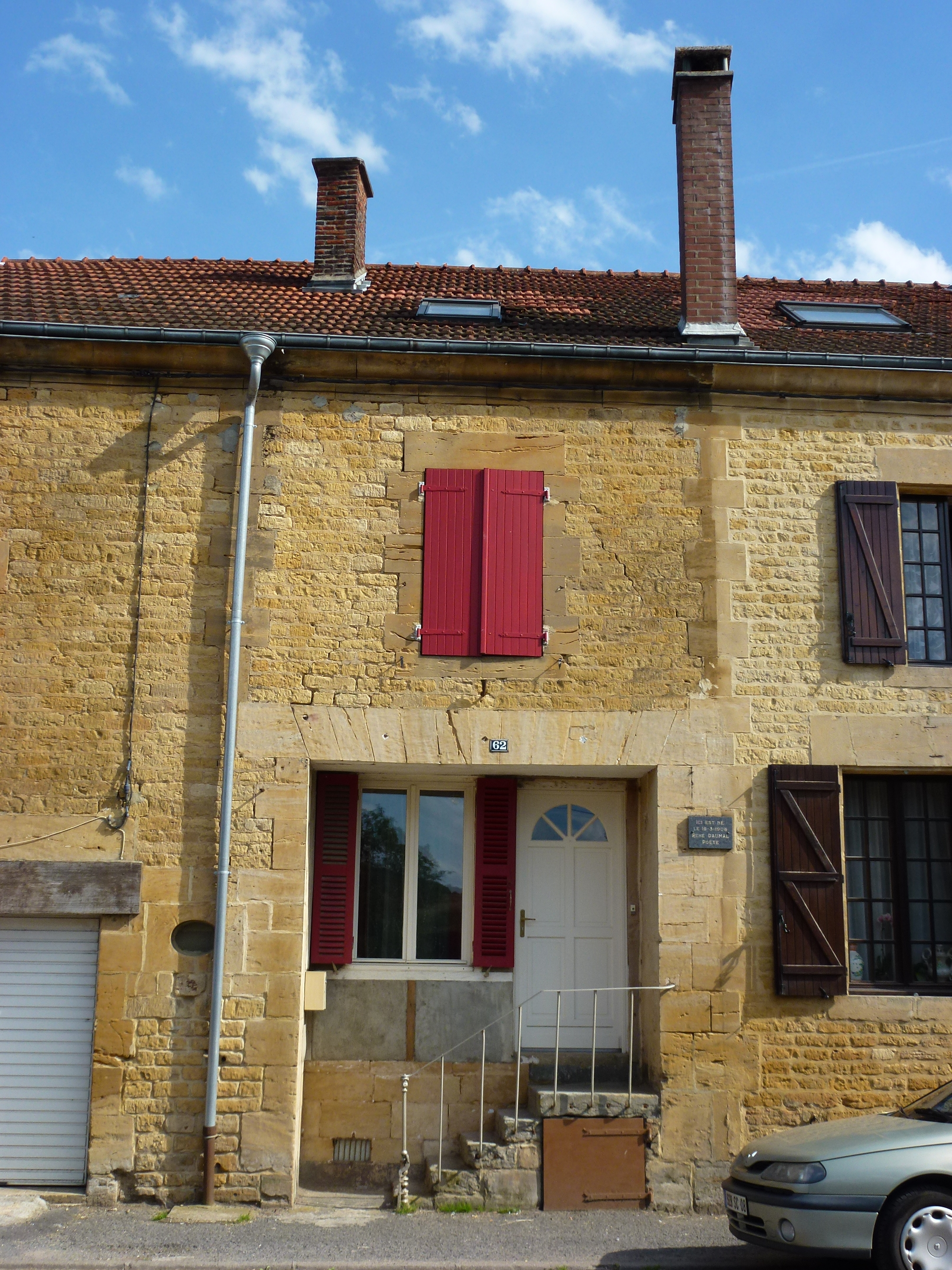
House in Boulzicourt, Ardennes, where Daumal was born

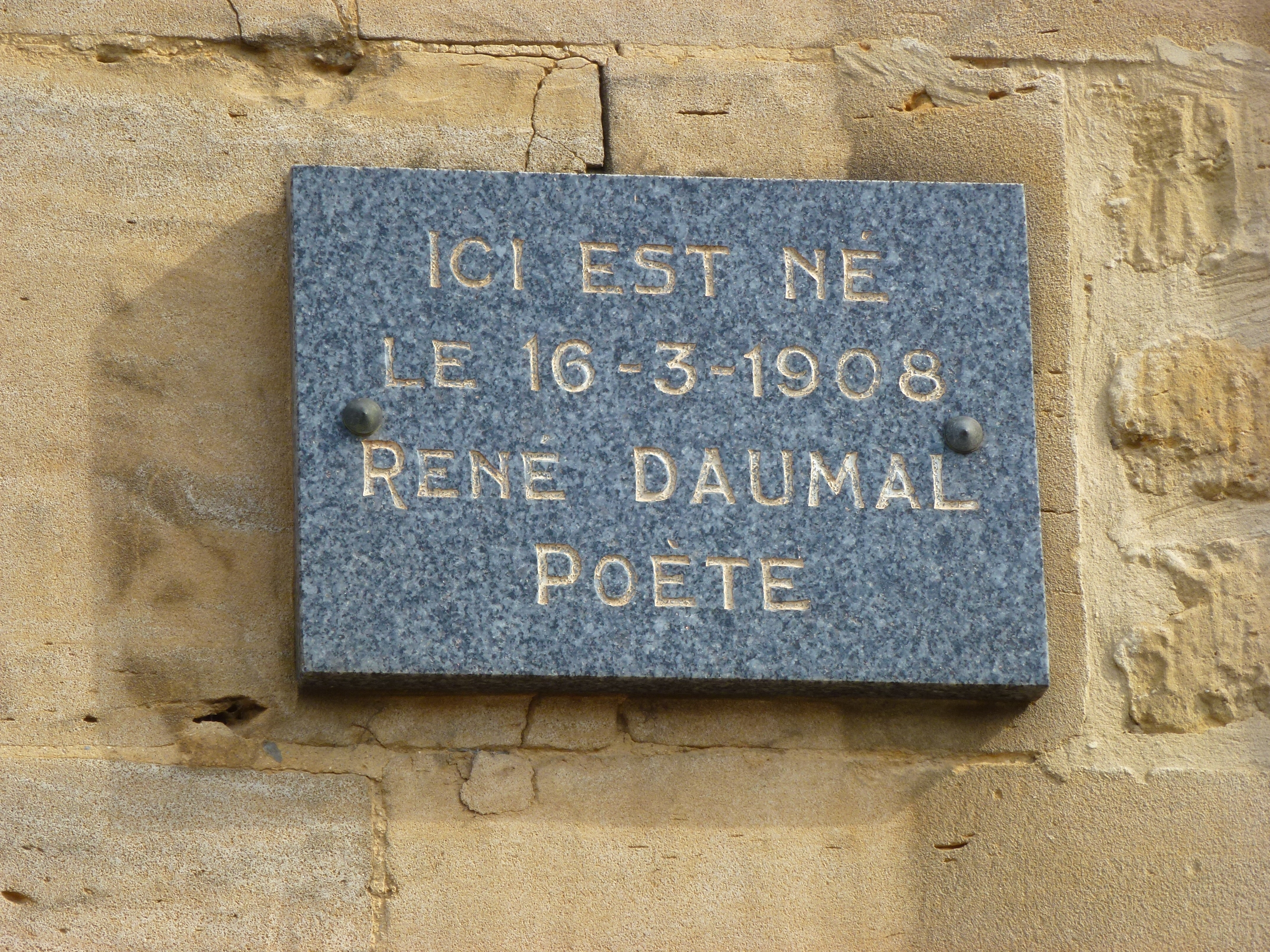
Close of the plaque, outside the house

Daumal was born in Boulzicourt, Ardennes, France. In his late teens his avant-garde poetry was published in France's leading journals. As an adolescent, Daumal co-founded the art group Les Phrères Simplistes with the poets Roger Gilbert-Lecomte and Roger Vailland. They would later co-found the literary journal Le Grand Jeu, which published three issues between 1928 and 1930. Although courted by André Breton, the journal was founded as a counter to Surrealism and Dada; the Surrealists reacted to its publication with some hostility.

He is best known in the English-speaking world for two novels: A Night of Serious Drinking, and the allegorical novel Mount Analogue: A Novel of Symbolically Authentic Non-Euclidean Adventures in Mountain Climbing, both based upon his friendship with Alexander de Salzmann, a pupil of G. I. Gurdjieff.

Daumal was self-taught in the Sanskrit language and translated some of the Tripitaka Buddhist canon into the French language, as well as translating the literature of the Japanese Zen scholar D.T. Suzuki into French.

He married the Bulgarian émigré Vera Milanova, the former wife of the poet Hendrik Kramer; after Daumal's death, she married the landscape architect Russell Page.

== Death ==
Daumal's sudden and premature death from tuberculosis on 21 May 1944 in Paris may have been hastened by youthful experiments with drugs and psychoactive chemicals, including carbon tetrachloride. He died leaving his novel Mount Analogue unfinished, having worked on it until the day of his death.

He is buried at Cimetière parisien de Pantin in Pantin, a municipality just outside Paris.

== Legacy ==
The motion picture The Holy Mountain by Alejandro Jodorowsky is based largely on Daumal's Mount Analogue.

== Bibliography ==
=== Works by René Daumal in English translation ===
- Le Contre-Ciel (Le contre-ciel), Woodstock, New York: Overlook Press, 2005.
- Le Contre-Ciel: The Anti-Heaven, Part One, Black River Falls, Wisconsin, 2002. transl. and with an introduction by Jordan Jones.
- Le Contre-Ciel: The Anti-Heaven, Parts Two and Three, Black River Falls, Wisconsin, 2003. transl. Jordan Jones.
- A Fundamental Experiment, New York / Madras: Hanuman Books, 1987; first published: René Daumal, "A Fundamental Experiment", X magazine, Vol. I, No. I (November 1959).
- The Lie of the Truth and Other Parables from the Way of Liberation, New York / Madras: Hanuman Books, 1989.
- Mount Analogue (Le mont analogue), Woodstock, New York: Overlook Press, 2004.
- Mugle and the Silk (Mugle; La soie), New York, Edwin Mellen Press, 1997.
- A Night of Serious Drinking (La grande beuverie), Woodstock, New York: Overlook Press, 2003.
- Pataphysical Essays, Cambridge: Wakefield Press, 2012.
- The Powers of the Word (1927–1943) (Les pouvoirs de la parole), San Francisco: City Lights, 1991.
- 'Rasa or Knowledge of the Self' Essays on Indian Aesthetics and Selected Sanskrit Studies. New York: New Directions, 1982.* ed. Claudio Rugafiori, transl. Louise Landes Levi, Repr. Kathamndu, Nepal, Shivastan, 2002 & 2006 (each edition 333 copies).
- You've Always Been Wrong (Tu t'es toujours trompé), Lincoln: University of Nebraska Press, 1995. transl. Thomas Vosteen.
- René Daumal, Letters on the Search for Awakening, 1930–1944, Toronto: Dolmen Meadow Editions, 2010. transl. Gabriela Ansari and Roger Lipsey, with an introduction by Roger Lipsey.
