= List of Czech artists =

This is a list of Czech artists. These include artists in traditional media such as painting, sculpture, photography and printmaking as well as other genres, including installation art, performance art, conceptual art and video art.

== A ==
- Miroslav Adámek, (1957–2002), painter, illustrator
- Mikoláš Aleš, (1852–1913), painter
- Jiří Anderle, (born 1936), painter, graphic artist
- Jaroslav Augusta, (1878–1970), painter
- Jan Autengruber, (1887–1920), painter

== B ==
- Helena Bochořáková-Dittrichová (1894–1980), graphic artist
- Vladimír Boudník (1924–1968), photographer and graphic artist
- Jaroslava Brychtová (1924–2020), glass artist and sculptor
- Charlotta Burešová (1904–1983), artist and Holocaust survivor

== C ==
- Jiří Černický (born 1966), intermedia artist
- David Černý (born 1967), sculptor

== D ==
- Dorrit Dekk (1917–2014), graphic designer, printmaker and painter
- Jiri Georg Dokoupil (born 1954), painter

== F ==
- Emanuel Famíra (1900–1970), sculptor and painter

== H ==
- Vladimír Havlík (born 1959), action artist, painter
- Vlastislav Hofman (1884–1964), painter, designer and architect
- Alexandr Vladimír Hrska (1890–1954), painter, graphic designer, and scenographer

== J ==
- František Janák (born 1951), glass artist
- Ludmila Janovská (1907–after 1962), painter

== K ==
- Lukáš Kándl (born 1944), painter
- Milan Knížák (born 1940), performance artist
- Běla Kolářová (1923–2010), collagist and photographer
- Marian Korn (1914–1987), printmaker
- Věra Kotasová (1939–2019), painter, printmaker
- Eva Koťátková (born 1982) installation artist
- Jan Kotík (1972–2007)
- Ludvík Kuba (1863–1956), painter
- Alena Kupčíková (born 1976), contemporary artist
- František Kupka (1871–1957), painter, abstract expressionist
- Vladimir Kokolia (born 1956)

== L ==
- Josef Lada (1887–1957), painter, illustrator

== M ==
- Martin Mainer (born 1959), painter
- Adéla Matasová (born 1940), sculptor
- Alena Matejka (born 1966), sculptor
- Alphonse Mucha (born 1860) graphics artist, sculptor

== O ==
- Jakub Obrovský (1882–1949), sculptor
- Eduard Ovčáček (born 1933), lettrist, graphic artist, sculptor, painter

== R ==
- Bob Rakušan (born 1948), painter
- Veronika Richterová (born 1964), artist

== S ==
- Alexander Sádlo (1927–2021), painter, enamallist
- Tom Samek (1950–2021), muralist
- Malva Schalek (1882–1944), painter
- Miloš Šejn (born 1947), performance artist
- Jaroslava Severová (born 1942), printmaker
- T. F. Šimon (1877–1942), painter, printmaker
- František Skála (born 1956), sculptor, painter
- Milena Šoltészová (born 1939), printmaker
- Václav Špála (1885–1946) painter, graphic designer, illustrator
- Hana Storchová (born 1936), painter, printmaker
- Viktor Stretti (1878–1957), engraver
- Naděžda Synecká (1926–2021), printmaker

== T ==
- Karel Teige (1900–1951), graphic artist and photographer

== V ==
- Martin Velíšek (born 1963) glass artist, painter
- Aleš Veselý (1935–2015), sculptor
- Jiří Votruba (born 1946), designer, painter

== W ==
- Julie Wimmer (born 1975), designer

== Z ==
- Helen Zelezny-Scholz (1882–1974), sculptor
- Ludmila Zeman (born 1947), Czech-Canadian animator
- Kamila Ženatá (born 1953), installations, video art
- Helena Zmatlíková (1923–2005), illustrator

== See also ==
- List of Czech painters
- List of Czech women artists
- Lists of painters by nationality
- Czech art
- List of lists of painters by nationality
