= List of Czech women artists =

This is a list of women artists who were born in the Czech Republic or Czechoslovakia or whose artworks are closely associated with those countries.

== B ==
- Edith Birkin (1927–2018), painter
- Helena Bochořáková-Dittrichová (1894–1980), graphic artist
- Zdenka Braunerová (1858–1934), landscape painter

== C ==
- Anna Chromý (born 1940), painter, sculptor
- Zuzana Čížková (born 1982), sculptor, painter

== D ==
- Anna Daučíková (born 1950), visual artist
- Dorrit Dekk (1917–2014), graphic designer, printmaker and painter
- Tamara Divišková (born 1934), ceramist
- Hana Dostalová (1890–1981), painter, illustrator, textile and glass designer

== E ==
- Helena Emingerová (1858–1943), visual artist

== F ==
- Felicita Frai (1909–2010), painter

== H ==
- Helga Hošková-Weissová (born 1929), painter

== J ==
- Irena Jůzová (born 1965), sculptor
- Ludmila Janovská (1907–after 1962), painter
- Věra Janoušková (1922–2010), sculptor, painter, graphic artist

== K ==
- Mary Louisa Kirschner (1852–1931), painter, glass artist
- Marian Korn (1914–1987), printmaker
- Věra Kotasová (1939–2019), painter, printmaker
- Eva Kotátková, (born 1982) installation artist
- Alena Kupčíková (born 1976), contemporary artist
- Martina Krupičková (born 1975), painter

== L ==
- Hermine Laucota (1853–1931), painter, engraver

== M ==
- Amalie Mánesová (1817–1883), painter
- Adéla Matasová (born 1940), sculptor
- Alena Matejka (born 1966), sculptor
- Charlotte Mayer (1929–2022), sculptor
- Galina Miklínová (born 1970), illustrator, cartoonist
- Jaroslava Muchová (1909–1986), painter

== P ==
- Květa Pacovská (born 1928), painter, illustrator
- Michaela Pavlátová (born 1961), animator
- Charlotte Piepenhagen-Mohr (1821–1902), painter
- Miluše Poupětová (born 1963), painter

== R ==
- Kamila B. Richter (born 1976), internet artist, painter, media artist

== S ==
- Malva Schalek (1882–1945), painter
- Jaroslava Severová (born 1942), printmaker
- Adriena Šimotová (1926–2014), painter, graphic artist, installation art
- Trude Sojka (1909–2007), painter, sculptor
- Milena Šoltészová (born 1939), printmaker
- Jitka Štenclová (born 1952), painter, textile artist
- Hana Storchová (born 1936), painter, printmaker
- Libuše Stratilová (1933–2001), painter, printmaker
- Eva Švankmajerová (1940–2005), surrealist artist
- Naděžda Synecká (1926–2021), printmaker

== T ==
- Toyen (1902–1980), painter, drafter, illustrator, surrealist artist

== V ==
- Věra Vovsová (1912–1998), painter

== W ==
- Julie Wimmer (born 1975), designer

== Z ==
- Helen Zelezny-Scholz (1882–1974), sculptor
- Ludmila Zeman (born 1947), Czech-Canadian animator
- Kamila Ženatá (born 1953), video art, installations
- Helena Zmatlíková (1923–2005), illustrator
