= Tomáš Vosolsobě =

Tomáš Vosolsobě (7 March 1937 – 10 January 2011) was a Czech painter, philatelist and occasional photographer.

== Biography ==
Vosolsobě was born on 7 March 1937 in Prague. After completing his studies at the Academy of Fine Arts in Prague, he worked as a designer by profession. He also dedicated his career to filmmaking and graphic advertising. In 70th he worked as a photographer for the Postal Museum in Prague.

Thanks to oppressive circumstances in Czechoslovakia in 1982 he moved to Switzerland, where he spent 18 years of his life.

His artistic style is unique and his work has always responded to the changing times. He was a representative of Informal, in their creative works developed the theme of symmetry and not a small part of his work was dedicated to strong color contrasts.

He was a member of the Union of Czechoslovak Artists, Union of Visual Artists of the Czech Republic and the Central Association of Artists. Their works exhibited in many solo and group exhibitions.
