= Veronika Drahotová =

Czech artist (born 1975)

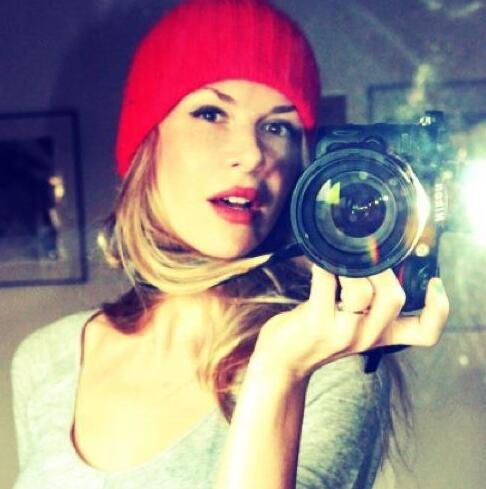
- Born: 25 July 1975 (age 51); Prague, Czechoslovakia
- Education: Academy of Fine Arts, Prague
- Occupations: Artist and curator

Veronika Drahotová (born 25 July 1975) is a Czech artist and curator. She is best known for mixed-media work incorporating painting, photography, video and installation.

== Career ==
In 1992, she was one of the youngest students ever to matriculate at the prestigious Academy of Fine Arts, Prague, studying under J. David and J. Sopko, receiving a one-year scholarship (1995) at the San Francisco Art Institute, and a Master of Arts degree in 2000.

She made her first big splash in the art world in 1998 with Castle in the Sky, a large-scale light installation funded by the Soros Foundation. In it, the famous Prague Castle was completely illuminated in a rainbow glow for several nights, and it's still considered one of the largest public art displays to take place in the Czech Republic.

The rainbow symbolism from "Castle in the Sky" was naturally incorporated into Drahotová's ever-growing iconographic vocabulary. This highly visualized language of symbols appears persistently throughout her work across all mediums, encouraging a sense of interconnectedness within and between each. The evolution of that iconography can clearly be seen in her early portrait work, which includes the postmodern series "Bad Boys" (1997–2004), and plays out prominently in her constructed objects and installations, such as FF (for S. H.; 2004) and POP (Preliminary Orientation in the Problem; 1999).

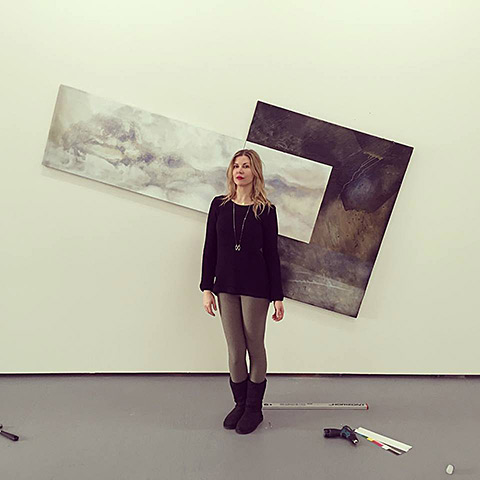
Veronika Drahotová in 2015

In 2015, her work was featured in Vienna for Art's Sake, a group show with contributions from more than 100 visual artists, including Christo, Frank Gheary and Zaha Hadid, which will tour Europe and the U.S. as the "Luciano Benetton Collection 10 x 12."

Her next series have focused more on painting, specifically large-scale canvases filled with geometric objects that merge with and collide into 3-D relief elements, an implicit commentary on the tension between philosophy and psychology, spiritualism and mathematics. Furthermore, Drahotová has created a new system of painting she refers to as 'architectonic'. This approach utilizes two or more canvases in a single painting, allowing the pieces to be arranged in several predetermined ways to reveal different compositions. By orientating or interchanging the canvases both horizontally and vertically, and rotating them 90 degrees in relation to each other, several compositions emerge. In this way, the canvases of the recent series "Massive Memory" (2015) can be arranged together on the wall in various interchangeable configurations, like interactive panels in a constantly shifting landscape.

In 2002, Drahotová founded Home Gallery in Prague, and as director curated more than a dozen exhibitions over two years featuring artists from all over Europe.

She has had more than ten solo shows in the U.S., Japan, and across Europe, and participated in dozens of group shows. She currently resides in Prague.

== Solo shows ==
- 2015: Massive Memory, Kampa Gallery, Sovovy mlýny, Prague, CZ
- 2014: Ale/But, Černá labuť, Praha, CZ
- 2014: Until the End of Time, Piersone, Praha, CZ
- 2013: Theory of Nothing, Berlínskej model, Prague, CZ
- 2012: 12, Gambit Gallery, Prague, CZ
- 2012: Sugar Choice Prince Prager Gallery, Prague
- 2012: Retrospective, Uffo Společenské Centrum Trutnov
- 2011: They_I (with Nikola Semotanova), Trafačka Gallery, Prague, CZ
- 2009: Memplex City, Icon Gallery, Prague, CZ
- 2008: Memplex Rip, Blansko Gallery, CZ
- 2005: Autoreverse, The Art Critics Gallery, Prague, CZ
- 2004: Preliminary Orientation, Chromosome Gallery, Berlin, D
- 2004: Ali-En-Ace, Futura gallery, Prague, CZ
- 2002: Latest Art, Vernon Fine Art, Prague, CZ
- 2001: GRAVE, Remont Gallery, Belgrade, YU
- 2001: Mind the Heart, Behemot Gallery, Prague, CZ
- 2001: Sky is Empty, U cerného pavouka Gallery, Ostrava, CZ
- 1999: Friends Forever, Pecka Gallery, Prague, CZ
- 1998: See Through, the Czech Center, Brussels, Belgium
- 1996: Fiona Whitney Gallery, Wilcox L.A., USA

== Selected group shows ==
- 2015: Vienna for Art's Sake!, Winter Palas, Vienna, AT
- 2014: Peace Plese, Artinbox Gallery, Praha, CZ
- 2014: Damský Gambit, Brussels
- 2013: 12, Galerie Gambit, Prague, CZ
- 2012: The Fine Art Collection, Barbican Center, UK
- 2012: Současná česká malba, NTK, CZ
- 2012: Fire Walk With Me, XXL, Louny, CZ
- 2011: Pátý přes deváty, Trafačka, CZ
- 2011: Unknown Area, Gallery Graz, D
- 2009: Girls Against Boys, Galerie Szara, PL
- 2008: Sexismus, Galerie Václava Špály, Praha, CZ
- 2008: Spleen & Ideal, Karlín studios, Praha, CZ
- 2007: Vitamin P, Galerie Bastart, Bratislava, Košice, SK
- 2007: Spleen & Ideal, Brno Gallery, CZ
- 2006: Safe, Karlin Studios, Pague, CZ
- 2006: Runaway, Space Gallery, Bratislava, SK
- 2006: Sigmund Freud – Life is but a Dream, Oldtown Gallery, Prague, CZ
- 2006: Czech Point, NOG
- 2006: Videobus, Prague – Brno, CZ
- 2006: Mnultiplace, Bratislava, SK
- 2006: Stop domestic violence, Praha, CZ
- 2005: Beauty Free Shop, Praha, CZ
- 2005: Lebka, AVU Gallery, Praha, CZ
- 2005: Multiplace, Bratislava, SK
- 2004: Pure Beauty, Critics Gallery, Prague, CZ
- 2004: Eastern Alience, TOE, Berlin, D
- 2004: Within Reach, Home Gallery, CZ
- 2003: TAIL, Twig Gallery, NYC, USA
- 2003: Pretty Communication, Priestor Gallery, Bratislava, SK
- 2003: Inout, Budapest, Hungary
- 2003: Inout, Prague, CZ
- 2003: Elektrobot, Prague, CZ
- 2002: In Between, Czech Center, NYC, USA
- 2002: City of Women, Cankarjev dom, Ljubljana, Si
- 2002: Art Frankfurt, Chromosome Gallery, D
- 2001: Fotok, Meo, Budepest, H
- 2001: To Flow To, Chromosome Gallery, Berlin, D
- 2001: Artists for Umelec, Hardheaded Gallery, Prague, CZ
- 2001: Feme Fatal, Kutná Hora, CZ
- 2000: Bohemian Birds, Kunst Haus, Dresden, D,
- 2000: Story, noD, Prague
- 2000: Training, Bratislava – Košice, SK
- 2000: Sources of New Style, Prague, CZ
- 2000: The Southern Affair, České Budějovice, CZ
- 2000: Artesco, Polyphonic arts in Prague, CZ
- 2000: Open Air, Exodus, Prague, CZ
- 2000: ... (three dots), the NO D Gallery, Prague, CZ
- 1999: No Sex Until Marriage, Prague, CZ
- 1999: Open Gallery, Prague, CZ
- 1998: Zelená (Green), the Academy of Fine Arts (AVU) Gallery, Prague, CZ
- 1998: Umělecké dílo ve veřejném prostoru (Art in Public Space), implementation of projects (see below), Prague, CZ
- 1997: Umělecké dílo ve veřejném prostoru (Art in Public Space), exhibition concepts in the Veletržní Palace (Modern and Contemporary Art Collection of the Czech National Gallery), Prague, CZ
- 1995: In and Out, San Francisco, USA
- 1994: Obrazy (Paintings), Prsten Gallery, Prague, CZ

== Work ==
- 2002 – 2004: Director of Home Gallery, Prague, CZ

== Education ==
- 1997-2000: MFA Visual Communications Studio, lecturer J. David, (AVU), Prague, CZ achieved Master of Fine Art degree
- 1996: Passed the BA exams at AVU, Prague, CZ
- 1995: One-semester scholarship at the San Francisco Art Institute, USA
- 1993-1996: Classical Painting Techniques Studio, Professor Beran (AVU), Prague, CZ
- 1992-1993: Painting I Studio, Professor J. Sopko (AVU), Prague, CZ
- 1991-1992: Vaclav Hollar High School of Applied Arts, Prague, CZ
- 1990-1991: High School of Applied Arts and Technology, Prague, CZ
- AVU = Academy of Fine Arts
