= Cyril Höschl =

Czech psychiatrist and university lecturer (1949–2025)

Prof. MUDr. Cyril Höschl DrSc., FRCPsych.
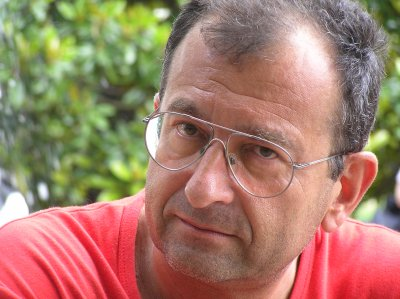
- Born: 12 November 1949; Prague, Czechoslovakia
- Died: 21 April 2025 (aged 75); Czech Republic
- Occupation: Psychiatrist
- Spouse: Jitka Štenclová

Signature
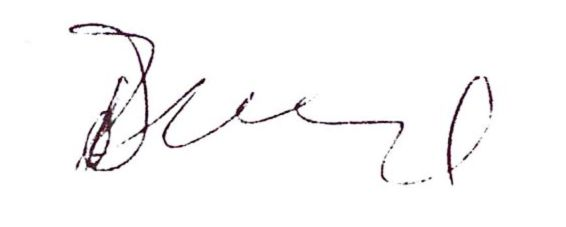

Cyril Höschl (Czech: [ˈtsɪrɪl ˈɦɛːʃl̩]; 12 November 1949 – 21 April 2025) was a Czech psychiatrist and university lecturer. After the Velvet Revolution, he was the first freely elected Dean of the third Medical Faculty of Charles University (1990–1997) and from 1997 to 2003 he served as Vice-Dean for Reform Studies and International Relations at the same faculty. He was the director of the Prague Psychiatric Center (from 1990 to 2014) and head of the Department of Psychiatry and Medical Psychology of the Third Faculty of Medicine of the Charles University in Prague. On 1 January 2015 the Prague Psychiatric Center was transformed into the National Institute of Mental Health in Klecany, Czech Republic.

From 2007 to 2008 he served as President of the European Psychiatric Association, and then from 2008 to 2009, President of the Federation of European Academies of Medicine (FEAM). He was a founding member of the Learned Society of the Czech Republic and from 2004 to 2011 he was also president of the Czech Medical Academy. He was a member of the European Academy of Sciences and Arts and was a member of the European Brain Council (until Jan 2015). From 1996 he was a Member, and from 2003 Fellow of the Royal College of Psychiatrists, United Kingdom.

== Life and career ==
After graduating from the F. X. Šalda Gymnasium in Liberec in 1968, he continued his studies at the Faculty of General Medicine, Charles University, where he graduated in 1974 (MUDr.). During his studies, he collaborated with Professor Jan Štěpán, one of the founders of Czech osteology, at the Institute of Biochemistry. Initially, he intended to devote himself to internal medicine and pharmacology. He chose psychiatry as his professional field mainly because the preferred medical specializations in Prague's medical centers and clinics were fully staffed.

From 1974, he worked at the Psychiatric Research Institute in Prague-Bohnice (later on Prague Psychiatric Centre, which was since 1 January 2015 transformed into National Institute of Mental Health in Klecany, Czech Republic). He began his scientific career under Professor Lubomír Hanzlíček. In 1977 he passed the 1st degree attestation (residency) in Psychiatry and became an assistant professor at the Lékařská fakulta hygienická (Faculty of Hygiene), Charles University (since 1990 renamed to Third Faculty of Medicine). In 1981, he received the 2nd degree attestation. From 1990, he was the director of the Prague Psychiatric Center and head of the Department of Psychiatry and Medical Psychology of the Third Faculty of Medicine of the Charles University in Prague.

In 1982, he defended his PhD thesis in the field on neuroendocrinology: Some Endocrine Aspects of Lithium Prophylaxis (Charles University, 1981). In 1988, he completed his habilitation, and in 1991 was appointed Professor of Psychiatry at Charles University. In 1990 he received the title Doctor of Sciences (DrSc.) after successfully defended his thesis titled Neuroendocrinology in Psychiatry (Charles University, 1989).

From 1990 to 1997 he was dean of the Third Faculty of Medicine, and from 1997 to 2003 the vice-dean. In 1993, he was the opponent to Professor Karel Malý for the post of chancellor of Charles University. He also served as a professor at Pavol Jozef Šafárik University in Košice (from 2004 to 2011).

From 1994 to 1997 he was a member of the editorial board of the Lidové noviny newspaper. He was a member of the editorial board of the magazine Vesmír (since 1994) and editor-in-chief of the Psychiatrie, časopis pro moderní psychiatrii ("Psychiatry, a Journal for Modern Psychiatry", since 1997), member of the editorial boards of the journals Current Opinion in Psychiatry, Integrative Psychiatry (since 1994) and a member of the advisory board of the magazine "Praktický lékař". He was an honorary editor of Neuroendocrinology Letters (since 1997) and member of the editorial board of the International Journal of Psychiatry in Clinical Practice (since 1998).

Höschl died on 21 April 2025, at the age of 75.

== Honorary memberships ==
Höschl was an honorary member of the Slovak Psychiatric Society (2006), Czech Psychiatric Society (2010), Czech Society of Biological Psychiatry (2013), Czech Neuropsychopharmacological Society (CNPS, 2017), and European Psychiatric Association (2017).

== Politics ==
Höschl was never a member of a political party. In 1996, he unsuccessfully ran for election to the Senate of the Parliament of the Czech Republic.
