= Sejna =

Sejna or Šejna may refer to:

- Jan Šejna (1927–1997), Czech-Czechoslovak general who defected to the US in 1968
- Karel Šejna (1896–1982), Czech conductor
- Marco Sejna (born 1972), German footballer
- Peter Sejna (born 1979), Slovak ice hockey player
- 21985 Šejna, a main belt asteroid
- Sejny, a town in Poland

== See also ==
- Miloš Šejn
- Shein (disambiguation)
- Schein
- Şeineanu
- Sajnovics
