= Lukáš Kándl =

Czech artist (born 1944)

Lukáš Kándl (born in 1944 in Prague, Protectorate of Bohemia and Moravia (present-day Czech Republic)) is a Czech magic realist artist.

He began specialising in oil painting at the Prague College of Art from 1959 to 1963. He continued his graduate study at the Prague Academy of Applied Art (1963 to 1969). In 1969, Kándl received his master's degree from the Academy of Fine Arts. Kándl held his first solo exhibition in Köln, Germany, in 1973, and this was followed by a string of exhibitions in Europe, Asia, Australia and America.

He currently lives with his family and maintains a studio in Saint-Germain-en-Laye, France. Kándl is an honorary member of the Copley Society of Art in Boston.

He has done many solo exhibitions as Nord Art, Kunstwerk Carlshütte in 2021, located in Büdelsdorf, Germany, as well as in Salle Gothique located in Vézelay, France;

== Publications ==
- 2007 - Metamorphosis (beinArt) ISBN 978-0-9803231-0-8
- 2007 - L’ange exquis: Être Ange, Étrange (Libellule Ltd.)
