= Czech art =

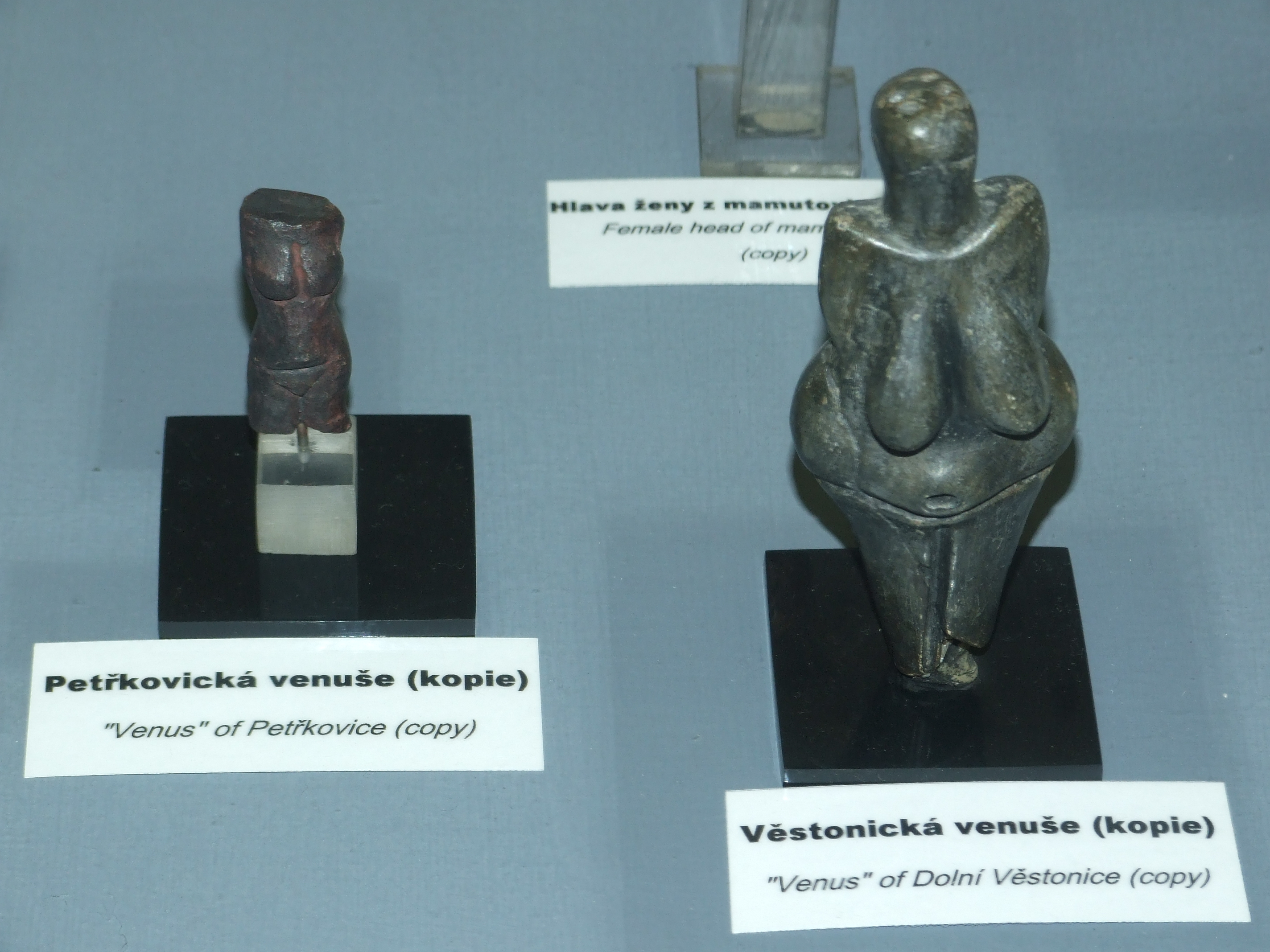
Copy of Venus of Petřkovice beside that of Venus of Dolní Věstonice at an exhibition in the National Museum, Prague

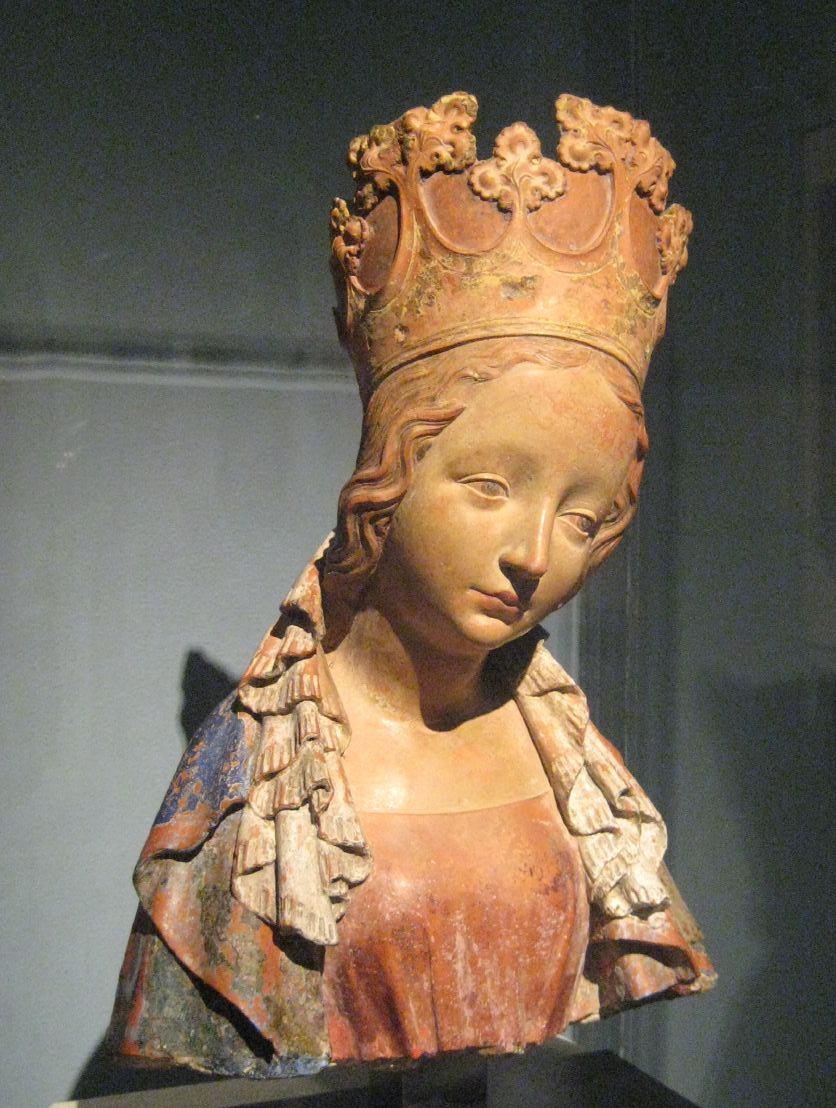
International Gothic bust of the Virgin, 1390–1395, painted terracotta

Czech art is the visual and plastic arts that have been created in the Czech Republic and the various states that formed the Czech lands in the preceding centuries. The Czech lands have produced artists that have gained recognition throughout the world, including Alfons Mucha, widely regarded as one of the key exponents of the Art Nouveau style, and František Kupka, a pioneer of abstract art.

The Czech lands have produced several important finds of prehistoric art, notably the Venus of Dolní Věstonice, a pottery Venus figurine of a nude female dated to 29,000–25,000 BC, and a distinct style of Celtic art. For most subsequent periods, Czech art was especially close to Austrian and German art. In periods when Prague was the capital of the Holy Roman Empire, it was a key centre of the contemporary artistic styles, harboring artists of both Czech and foreign origin. This was especially the case for the International Gothic style of the 14th century, and the Northern Mannerism of the late 16th and early 17th. After the Thirty Years War, when the largely non-Catholic Czech lands were returned to Catholic Habsburg control, a massive propaganda effort by the church has left rich remains of Baroque art and architecture. From the 19th century, Czech nationalism had a strong influence on all the arts.

== Gothic art ==
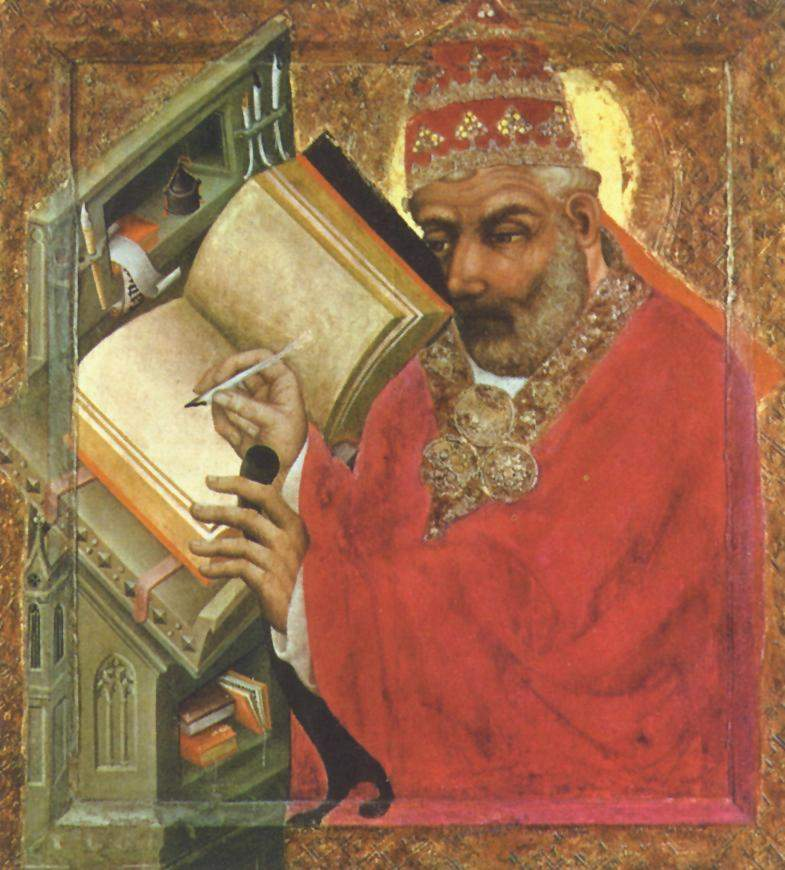
Master Theoderic, Saint Gregory 1370, currently in the National Gallery Prague

The Gothic style first appeared in the Czech lands in the first half of the 13th century and was usual there until the early 16th century. The phases of the development of Gothic art in the Czech lands are often named after the Bohemian ruling dynasty of the corresponding time:

- Early Gothic – Přemyslid Gothic (13th and early 14th century)
- High Gothic – Luxembourg Gothic (14th and early 15th century)
- Late Gothic – Jagiellonian Gothic (approximately 1471–1526)

The first recognisable period of Czech art is the International Gothic period, in which Charles IV had made the Crown of Bohemia, and Prague in particular, the centre of power of the Holy Roman Empire. Master Theodoricus is one of the first Czech artists that we know by name and is credited with the decoration of the Chapel of the Holy Cross in Karlštejn Castle. It contains 129 painted panels and is one of the artistic treasures of the medieval period in Bohemia.

A collection of busts in Prague Cathedral dating to 1379–1386 depict the benefactors of the cathedral. One of the busts depicts the artist himself, Petr Parléř the younger (1330–1399) and has been suggested to be the first recognisable self-portrait.

The importance of Bohemia at this time has been recognised and was a key centre in the diffusion of the artistic ideas of France and Italy, spread to England through the wife of Richard II, Anne of Bohemia.

Gothic painting as well as much of medieval art is of a religious nature.

=== Notable Gothic paintings ===
==== Early Gothic ====
- 1325–1349 Velislai biblia picta (Velislav's Bible) illustration on parchment – is the richest pictorial book of the Czech Middle Ages and includes illustrations of the Old Testament, Revelation of Saint John and the legends of the life of St. Wenceslaus and St. Ludmila. However it was not completed.
- 1345–1350 Vyšší Brod cycle (Hohenfurth altarpiece) – nine panel paintings depicting scenes from the life of Christ.

==== High Gothic ====
- 1385–1390 The Madonna of Roudnice is a work by the Master of the Třeboň Altarpiece.

==== Late Gothic ====
- 1510–1520 Wall painting of Saint George at Švihov Castle.

== Baroque ==
Petr Brandl was one of the most well known painters of his age in Bohemia and an important figure of the late Baroque.

== 19th century ==
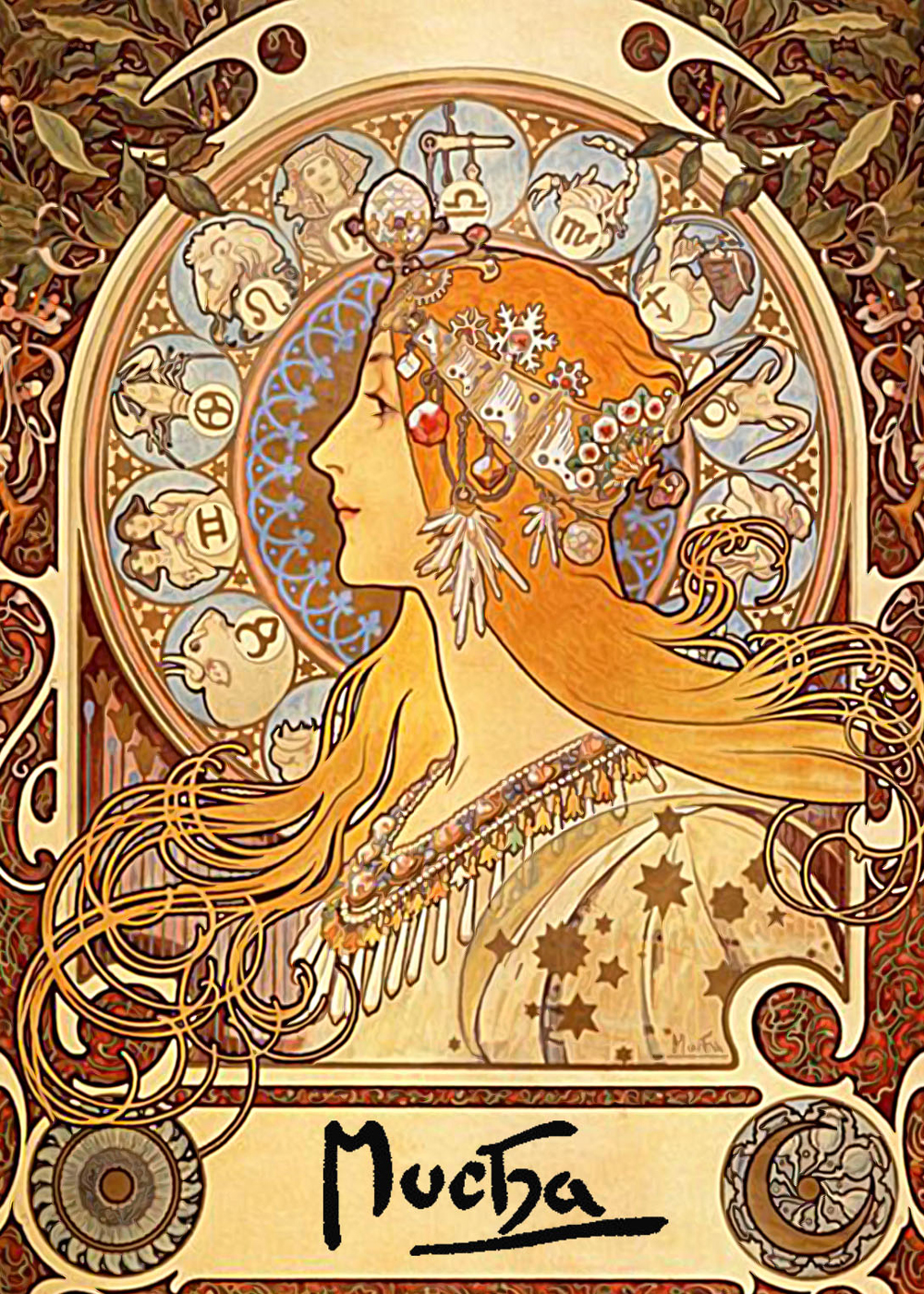
Zodiac an example of Alphonse Mucha's floral Art Nouveau style

=== National Revival ===
The National Revival, which had its roots in the last decades of the 18th century, led to a blossoming in the Czech visual arts that reached its apogee in the latter half of the 19th century. The artists of the period contributed to the decoration of the National Theatre, which became a focal point of artistic expression of the nation. One of the artists involved was Mikoláš Aleš who decorated the foyer along with František Ženíšek. Aleš is widely regarded within the Czech Republic as one of its greatest artists.

Other artists of the national revival included Aleš's colleagues at the Mánes Union of Fine Arts, artists at the Association of Moravian Artists such as Antoš Frolka and Alois Kalvoda, and Max Švabinský.

=== Fin de Siècle ===
The most important artist of this period is Alphonse Mucha. The work he is most known for is his commercial art from the 1890s which he created in Paris. However, he considered his masterpiece to be the Slav Epic, a visual exploration of the history of the Slavic peoples of Eastern Europe.

The Mánes Union of Fine Arts was an important institution in the last decade of the 19th century and lasted until its suppression by the Communists. It was founded in 1887 in Prague and fostered links between Czech artists with the international arts scene. It would later become associated with the Czech Cubist movement.

== 20th century ==
An important event in Czech art was the exhibition of Edvard Munch which took place in Prague in 1905 and inspired a new generation of Czech artists to express themselves in new ways, often looking to the international art scene, in particular that of France, for new ideas.

=== Early 20th-century Czech art ===
Max Švabinský (1873–1962) is one of the most notable artists from the period and his work spans many styles. His early work touched upon the genres of Realism and Symbolism. He designed windows for St Vitus Cathedral in Prague. He was widely regarded during his own lifetime and he was one of the few artists who was accepted by the Communist regime and was often commissioned by the government for official portraits. However, he was not a particularly political individual.

=== Cubism ===
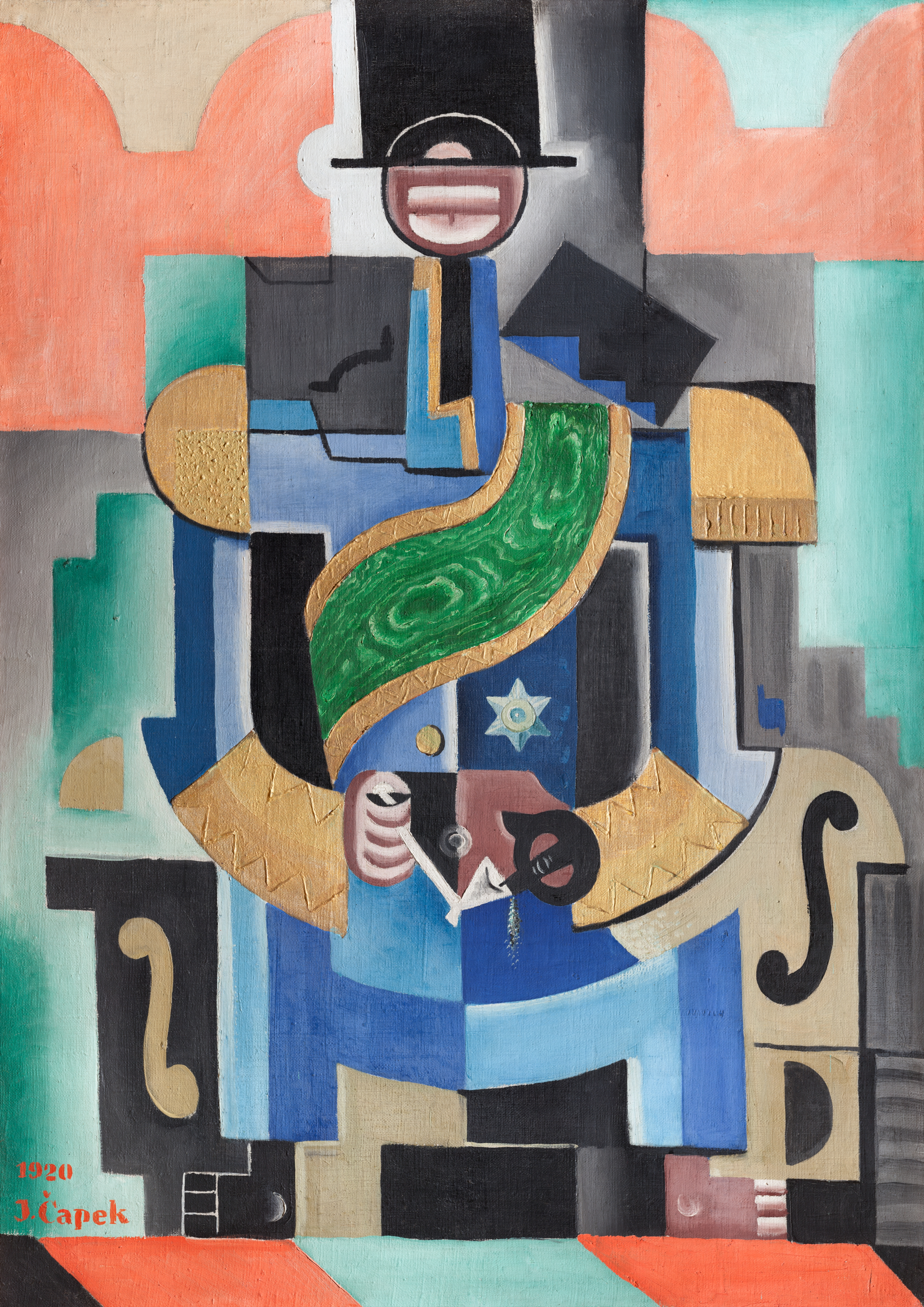
Josef Čapek, Portrait of a King (1920). An example of Czech Cubism.

An important movement of Czech art in the 20th century was Cubism, the most creative period being 1910–1919. Whilst there were visual artists who worked in the style, Czech Cubism is often mostly associated with architecture, so much so that the art historian Miroslav Lamac commented "Prague became the city of cubism". Bohumil Kubišta is an important artist associated with the movement and his work displays many French influences such as the brushwork of Paul Cézanne as well as the obvious influence of Pablo Picasso. František Kupka is probably the most internationally recognised Czech artist from the period and his work continued to evolve past Cubism, eventually establishing himself as an early pioneer of abstract art.

=== Contemporary art ===
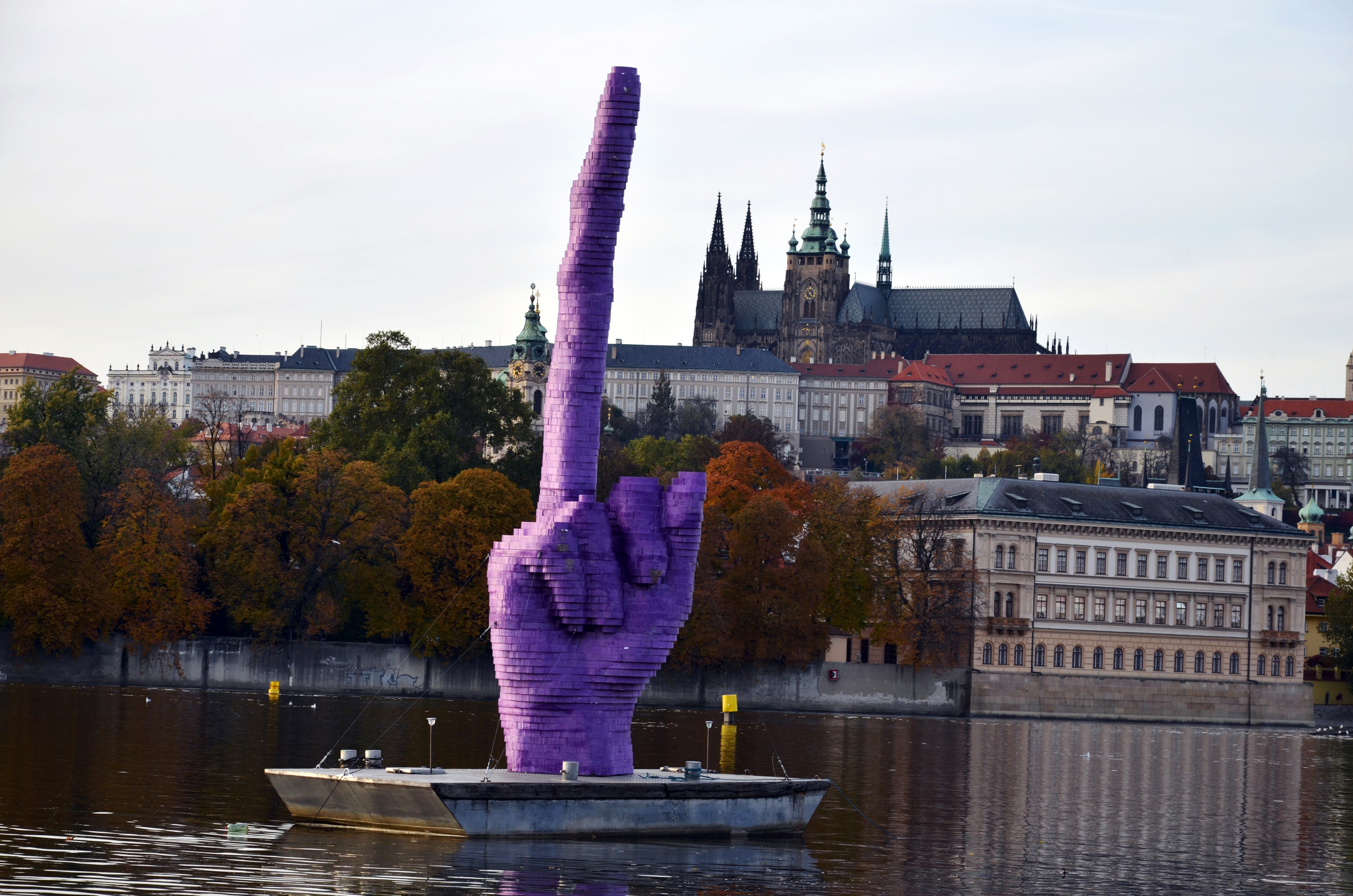
Gesture by David Černý. The artwork is facing the Prague Castle, residence of the President

A notable incidence of the contemporary Czech art scene was the work unveiled to commemorate the Czech presidency of the EU in 2009, Entropa by David Černý. The work explores European integration by presenting national stereotypes associated with each member state of the EU, some of which offended many viewers of the work.

== Art galleries and museums ==
The Czech National Gallery is the main institution for the display of artistic creation in the Czech Republic. It consists of many departments which each focus on a different aspect of art. The collection of pre-19th-century art is divided between the Convent of St Agnes, which contains medieval art, the Šternberský palác, dedicated to the Old Masters of Western European art, and the Schwarzenberský palác which focuses on works from the Renaissance to the Baroque created in the Czech Lands. The main centre for the display of Czech art from the 19th century is St. George's Convent, Prague.

The Moravian Gallery in Brno is the second largest art gallery in the Czech Republic. Its collection of modern art focuses particularly on the works of artists from the Czech Lands. It looks at both fine art and performance art.

== See also ==
- List of Czech artists by date
- Infant Jesus of Prague
