= Tom Samek =

Czech artist (1950–2021)

Tom Samek (11 March 1950 – October 2021) was a Czech artist who lived and worked in Australia. He was a painter, stage designer and printmaker.

== Life and work ==
Tom Samek was born in Prague, Czech Republic. He moved to Germany and Switzerland in 1969, then Austria the following year and Australia in 1971. In 1972 he studied printmaking with Eric Smodic in Austria for a year, then returned to Australia the following year. He settled in Tasmania.

Tom Samek. Smelling Mistake, digital print.

In 1997, he painted a mural in the foyer of the School of Engineering at the University of Tasmania.

Samek's largest, and perhaps finest, work is Flawed History of Tasmanian Wine, a floor mural in a gallery above the tasting room of the Meadowbank Estate winery and restaurant in Tasmania. The floor is painted, carved and etched in Samek's "unique style", and integrated with his friend Graeme Phillips' comic and nonsense poetry. The work was finished in December 2005, half of the $160,000 cost being met by the Federal Government.

In 2009, he returned to the University of Tasmania School of Engineering to create a mosaic mural, featuring names of notable engineers, and staff and students. It was unveiled during the 50th anniversary celebration of the school.

Samek made prints, including etchings, which "revel in the indulgences of food and drink." He adopted a whimsical view of Australian customs and language, at one time concentrating on faces and wine glasses, and in 2006 focusing on parrots as subject matter.

In the latter part of his life, he was based in Hobart, Tasmania. He died of motor neurone disease in October 2021 after a long illness.

== Collections ==
Samek's work is represented in the Australian National Gallery, South Australian Art Gallery, Queen Victoria Museum and Art Gallery, Auckland City Gallery, Tasmanian Museum and Art Gallery, Australia Council, and Artbank.

== See also ==
- List of Czech artists by date
