= Alexandr Vladimír Hrska =

Czech artist and scenographer (1890–1954)

Alexandr Vladimír Hrska (May 9, 1890 – October 23, 1954) was a Czech painter, graphic designer, and scenographer.

== Biography ==
Alexandr Vladimír Hrska was born May 9, 1890, in Prague, Vinohrady. He started his studies at the Academy of Fine Arts in Prague in 1909. After several years of general studies under Vlaho Bukovac, he was accepted to the Special Department for Graphics and Painting led by Max Švabinský, from which he successfully graduated in 1915. In 1915 he became a member of Mánes Union of Fine Arts.

In Spring 1916, he married Marie (Máša) Machoňová, a graduate of the Academy of Arts, Architecture and Design in Prague, and became the chief of stage of the Vinohrady Theatre. He closely cooperated with the stage director Karel Hugo Hilar. He was fired from the theatre during the strike in 1919 after being loyal to other employees. In the same year, he became a member of SČUG Hollar (Hollar Association of Czech Graphic Artists). Between 1921 and 1922, he worked in Brno as the Chief of Stage, where he prepared sets for the world premiere of the opera Káťa Kabanová by Leoš Janáček or The Insect Play by Karel Čapek and Josef Čapek. He was the external illustrator of Národní listy in 1927 to 1933, and Arts Adviser of the Slovak publisher Mazač in 1933 to 1936.

From 1936, he had no permanent employment. He painted, illustrated, made stage settings, and took part in exhibitions and contests. He won a bronze medal at the international exhibition in Paris, 1937. Until his death on October 23, 1954, he lived in his little house in Prague-Dejvice.

== Biography in dates ==
1890, May 9 – born in Prague (Vinohrady, Nr. 532), father František Hrstka (clerk), mother Emilie (maiden name Fialová)
1890, May 24 – baptized as Vladimír Josef
1896/1901 – primary school (Vinohrady, obecná škola Na Smetance)
1901/1909 – secondary school (Vinohrady, reálka Na Smetance)
1909/1915 – Academy of Fine Arts in Prague (C. k. Akademie Umění výtvarných v Praze): 1st – 2nd grade Prof. Vlaho Bukovac, 3rd – 4th grade the Special Department for Graphics and Painting of M. Švabinský at the Academy of Arts
1914 – study tour to Paris, France (almost 3 months)
1916, 29. IV. – married to Marie (called Máša), maiden name Machoňová, the graduate of School of painting and drawing for ladies (1908/1912, Prof. Em. Krostová) and Academy of Arts Architecture and Design in Prague (1912/1916)
- they live together in an apartment in Letohradská street 27, Praha XII
1916 – Autumn – he became temporary and then permanent painter of the Vinohrady Theatre (Městské divadlo na Královských Vinohradech), and later also the chief of stage
- became a member of the SVU Mánes (Sdružení výtvarných umělců Mánes – Association of Visual Artists Mánes), where he first gave an exhibition as guest
1918, December 24 – his daughter Eva was born
1919 – became a member of S. Č. U. G. Hollar (Sdružení českých umělců grafiků Hollar – Association of Czech Graphic Artists Hollar)
1919, December 23 – he left his employment at Vinohrady Theater because of the strike
1921/1922 – chief stage (dramaturgy: Mahen, director: V. Štěch) in City Theatre in Brno, where he made 23 stage setting in one season
- he started a number of great friendships, for example with Leoš Janáček, whom he made the world premiere of his opera "Káťa Kabanová" (November 23, 1921) and later his other operas, too ("Liška Bystrouška" – "The Cunning Little Vixen", "Její pastorkyňa" – "Her Stepdaughter")
- design of curtain for Theatre at the Veveří street; the curtain was installed in 1922
1921/1922 – he was accredited to teach "costume design" at the State music and drama conservatory in Brno (Státní hudební a dramatická konservatoř v Brně) for one hour per week
1922/1927 – freelance occupation artist, he worked mostly for theatres (National Theatre, and once also for Vinohrady Theatre) and as the illustrator
1927, April 27 – the stage setting for the premiere of opera "Švanda Dudák" by Jaromír Weinberger in National Theatre in Prague
1927/1933 – starting May 1, the permanent illustrator at Pražská akciová tiskárna (Prague Stock Printery), especially for Národní listy (National Newspaper)
1929 – poster "Barrandov Terraces"
1933/1936 – starting October 1, the art editor of Mazáč Publisher in Prague
1937 – free cycle of paintings and drawings with the theme of Prague bridges
1942 – book get-up "Pohádka Máje" (The May Fairy Tale) by Vilém Mrštík
- curtain for Na Poříčí Theatre for play "Trunda and Lajda" by Hauptmann
- the only one-man exhibition in his lifetime
Since 1945 – constant co-operation with theatre in Karlovy Vary
1946 – third prize in contest for decoration of the ceremony hall of the Old-town town-hall (Staroměstská radnice)
1948/1953 – every summer, he traveled to Okarec by Náměšť nad Oslavou
1949 – death of his wife
1950 – he worked on free cycle based on works by Czech writer Alois Jirásek
1954 – the last stage setting in Oblastní divadlo Karlovy Vary (the Regional Theatre Karlovy Vary) – (J. W. Goethe: Faust, directed by B. Stejskal)
1954, October 23 – died in Prague

== Latest exhibitions ==
- 2010 – Prague; especially paintings
- 2014 – Alexandr Vladimír Hrska – Znovunalezený; Prague
