= Veronika Richterová =

Czech artist

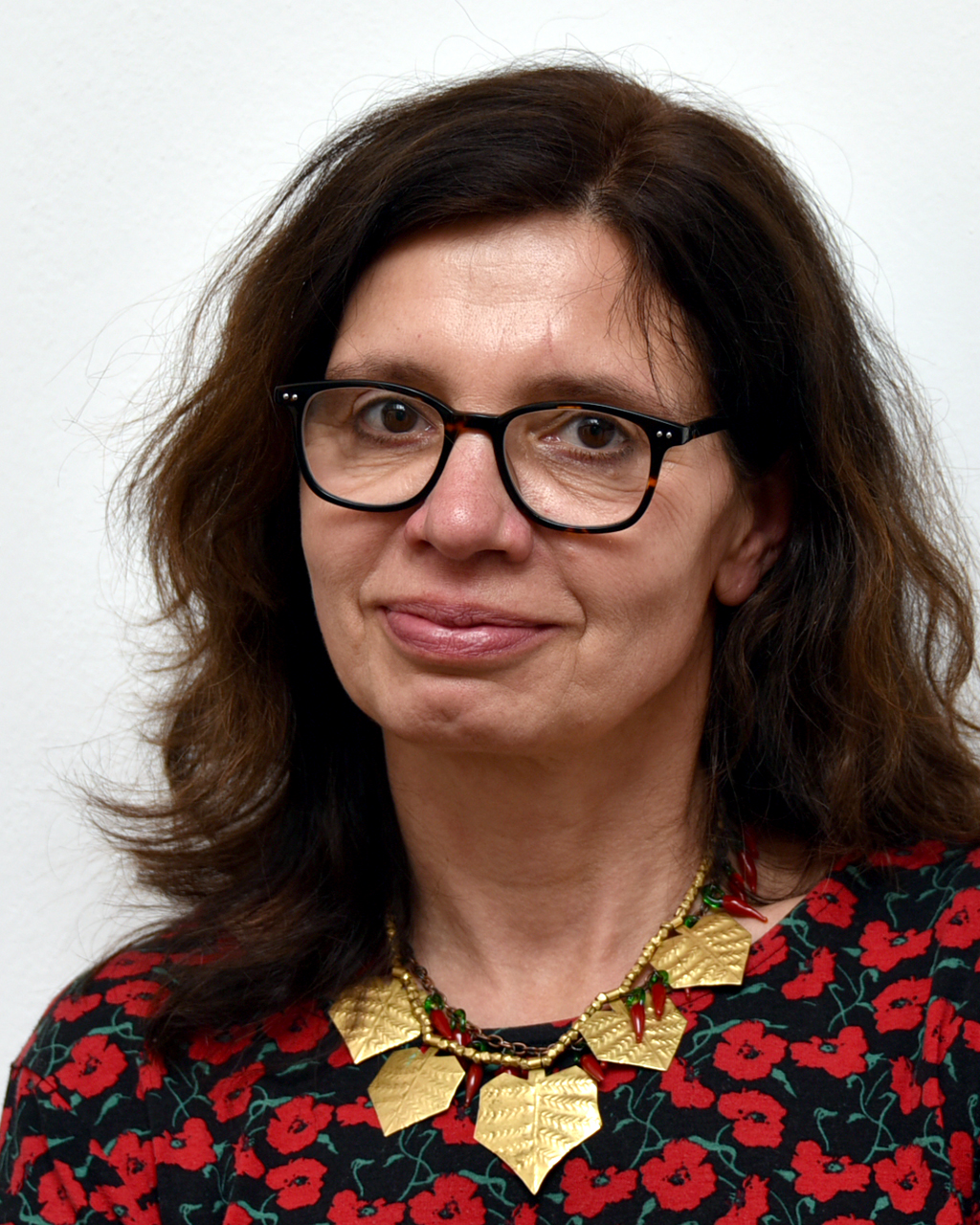
- Veronika Richterová (2019)
- Born: 11 January 1964; Prague
- Alma mater: Academy of Arts, Architecture and Design in Prague
- Occupation: Painter, sculptor, photographer
- Spouse(s): Michal Cihlář

Veronika Richterová (born 11 January 1964) is a Czech visual artist, painter and sculptor.

== Life ==
Richterová was born on 11 January 1964 in Prague, Czechoslovakia. She studied monumental painting at the Academy of Arts, Architecture and Design in Prague in 1984–1990. In 1989–1990, she completed an internship at the École nationale supérieure des Arts Décoratifs in Paris.

== Career ==
Richterová uses Polyethylene terephthalate or PET plastic waste in her sculptures.

=== Group exhibitions ===
- Plastic Age, East Bohemian Gallery in Pardubice, 26 June – 6 October 2019

== See also ==
- Plastic in art
- New materials in 20th-century art
- List of Czech artists
