= Naděžda Synecká =

Czech printmaker (1926–2021)

Naděžda Synecká (23 August 1926 – 11 September 2021) was a Czech printmaker.

A native of Prague, Synecká graduated from that city's Academy of Fine Arts, where she studied with Vladimír Silovský, in 1950. She continues to live and work in Prague. One of her prints is in the collection of the National Gallery of Art.

Synecká died on 11 September 2021, at the age of 95.
