= Helena Bochořáková-Dittrichová =

Czech illustrator, graphic novelist and painter

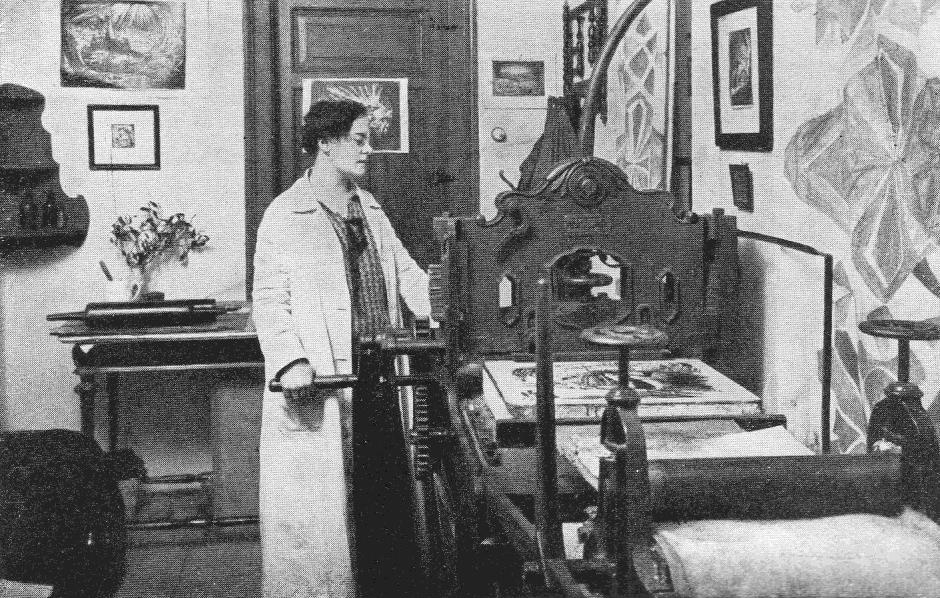
- Helena Bochořáková-Dittrichová in her atelier, 1923
- Born: 31 July 1894; Vyškov, Moravia, Austria-Hungary
- Died: 28 March 1980 (aged 85); Brno, Czechoslovakia
- Education: Academy of Fine Arts, Prague
- Known for: Illustration, painting, graphic novels

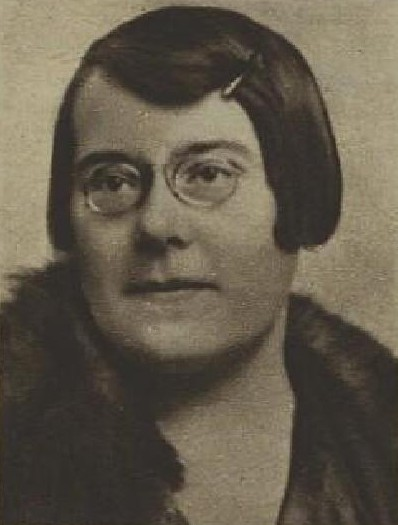
Bochořáková–Ditrichová in 1939

Helena Bochořáková-Dittrichová (31 July 1894 – 28 March 1980) was a Czech illustrator, graphic novelist, and later a painter. She is widely acknowledged as being the first female graphic novelist.

== Education and career ==
Bochořáková-Dittrichová was born in a middle-class family in Vyškov, Moravia, Austria-Hungary (now in the Czech Republic). She moved with her family to Brno in 1913, where she spent the rest of her life.

In 1919 she began studying painting and drawing at the Academy of Fine Arts in Prague. Upon graduating with a first prize in 1923, she received a Ministry of Education scholarship to study modern printmaking in Paris. It was there that she discovered the woodcut novels of pioneering Belgian artist Frans Masereel, who greatly influenced her future work.

Bochořáková-Dittrichová was a founding member of the KVU Alše Brno (visual artists' group).

Between 1924 and 1930, Bochořáková-Dittrichová had regular exhibitions at the Salon des Indépendants in Paris, as well exhibiting in Antwerp (1925), Philadelphia (1926), Zurich (1927), Buenos Aires (1928), and Vienna (1934). She was a passionate traveller and journeyed extensively throughout Europe, Russia and the United States until the outbreak of the Second World War.

She died in Brno at the age 85. She remains known as one of the leading printmakers and illustrators of the Czech Republic. Her art is showcased in many collections in the Czech Republic, including the Moravian Gallery, Museum Vyskovska, the Academy of Fine Arts in Prague, and the Brno City Museum.

== Influences ==
Bochořáková-Dittrichová was influenced by the Flemish artist Frans Masereel, while studying in Paris Masereel and other graphic novelists at the time were addressing issues of oppression and social injustice in their works; however, Bochořáková-Dittrichová's work was distinct, presenting the realistic and day-to-day lives of middle-class families, and also domestic issues that resembled her own life and upbringing.

Bochořáková-Dittrichová's art style is resonant with the contemporary trends in a number of European authors – Käthe Kollwitz, Ernst Barlach and Frank Brangwyn.

== Major works ==
Her first work, Z Mého Dětství (From my Childhood), published in 1929, is considered to be the first graphic novel (or wordless novel) published by a woman. The work consists of a story about the day-to-day activities of a sheltered girl in a middle-class family, and is told entirely through woodcuts. The book was later republished in German in September 1930 under the title of Kindheit, in French in October 1930 under the title of Enfance, and in English in January 1931 in an edition of 300 by the British bookshop and gallery A. Zwemmer, formerly of Charing Cross Road London under the title of Childhood. Her other major work, Malířka Na Cestách (The Painter on the Road), which was unpublished, presents 52 woodcuts and is likely an autobiography of the artists own journey.

== Books ==
=== Wordless novels ===
- Z Mého Dětství / From my Childhood (1929)
  - Kindheit: 95 Holzschnitte mit Einführung von Prof. A Weissenhofer (Childhood: 95 woodcuts with an introduction by Prof. A. Weissenhofer). September 1930 Adler -Verlag Berlin, Paris
  - Enfance: Gravures sur bois (Childhood: Wood Engravings). October 1930 Éditions Dorbon-Ainé, Paris
  - Childhood: A Cycle Of Woodcuts. 1931 A. Z. Zwemmer, London
- Malířka Na Cestách / The Painter on the Road (1930, unpublished)
- Indiáni jindy a dnes / Indians then and now (1934) publisher- Hranice, Brno
- Švédové před Brnem / Swedes at Brno (1936) publisher- K.V.U. Alsem, Brno
- Kristus: 32 dřevorytů k Novému zákonu / Christ: 32 woodcuts from the New Testament (1944) publisher listed as Anonymous Newspaper, Prague

=== Other novels/cycles ===
- Z života T.G. Masaryka / From the life of TG Masaryk (1930)
- Dřevoryty z USA / Woodcuts from the USA (1933)
- Dojmy z SSSR / Impressions of the USSR (1934)
- Mezi dvěma oceány : dojmy z cesty po Spojených státech amerických / Between two oceans: Impressions from a trip to the United States (1936)
- Příboj: román ze 17. století / Surge: a novel of the 17th century (1946)
- Nalomená větev / A bruised branch (1947)
- Rozkol / The split (1948)
- Oslavanské povstání : dřevoryty : Dva cykly dřevorytů k prosincovým událostem roku 1920 na Rosicko-Oslavansku / Oslavany uprising: Woodcuts: Two cycles of woodcuts to commemorate the December events of 1920 in Rosice-Oslavany (1960)
- Uprostřed proudu / Midstream (1967)
- Smršť nad Žuráněm / Whirlwind over Žuráň (1969)

== Print Portfolios ==
- Poklad / Treasure (5 woodcuts, 1920)
- Válka / War (4 linocuts, 1922)
- Kristus / Christ (5 woodcuts, 1922)
- Hříchy / Sins (5 woodcuts, 1923)
- Kain / Cain (3 woodcuts, 1923)
- Zaslíbená zemé / The Promised Land (5 woodcuts, 1923)
- Kristus, II. cyklus / Christ, 2nd cycle (5 woodcuts, 1923)
- Z Versailles / From Versailles (3 woodcuts, 1933)
- Oslavany (5 woodcuts, 1924)
- Bloudící / Going Astray (3 linocuts, 1924)
- Vyškov (6 woodcuts, 1924)
- Marnotratný syn / The Prodigal Son (3 woodcuts, 1924)
- Povstání / The Uprising (6 woodcuts, 1925)
- Stavba zemského domu / Building a Provincial House (7 woodcuts, 1925)
- Zahrada snů / Garden of Dreams (6 drypoints, 1925)
- Pohádky / Tales (5 color woodcuts, 1926)
- Venezia / Venice (6 color woodcuts, 1926)
- Déti / Children (28 line drawings, 1927)
- Brno (6 drypoints, 1928)
- Brno (4 color linocuts, 1928)
- Brno (7 color woodcuts, 1928)
- Třinec (5 color woodcuts, 1929)
- New York (6 woodcuts, 1932)
- Z Nového Mexika / From New Mexico (8 woodcuts, 1933)
- U sv. Antonícka / At St. Anthony's (5 woodcuts, 1936)
- Na Zakarpatské Rusi / In Zakarpattia Oblast (4 woodcuts, 1938)
- Brno po náletech / Brno after the bombings (3 drypoints, 1959)
- Přehrada / Reservoir (8 drypoints, 1960)
- Stavby socialismu / Construction of Socialism (5 sheets, 1960)
- Z veletrhu / From the Fair (5 woodcuts, 1962)

== Collections ==
The largest collection of Bochořáková-Dittrichová prints, drawings, and books outside of the Czech Republic is held at Houghton Library at Harvard University. Among the over 400 items in the collection is the second known copy of her unpublished graphic memoir, Malířka Na Cestách (The Painter on the Road).
