= Neuroendocrinology Letters =

- Discipline: Neuroendocrinology
- Language: English
- Edited by: Peter G. Fedor-Freybergh

Publication details
- History: 1979-present
- Publisher: Maghira & Maas Publications (Sweden)
- Frequency: 8/year
- Impact factor: 0.918 (2016)

Standard abbreviations
- ISO 4: Neuroendocrinol. Lett.

Indexing
- CODEN: NLETDU
- ISSN: 0172-780X
- OCLC no.: 175016994

Links
- Journal homepage; Online access and archive

Neuroendocrinology Letters (sometimes formatted Neuro-endocrinology Letters) is an international peer-reviewed medical journal covering neuroendocrinology. It was established in 1979 and is published eight times per year by Maghira & Maas Publications. The editor-in-chief is Peter G. Fedor-Freybergh (St. Elisabeth University). According to the Journal Citation Reports, the journal has a 2016 impact factor of 0.918.
