= Kamila Ženatá =

Czech artist (born 1953)

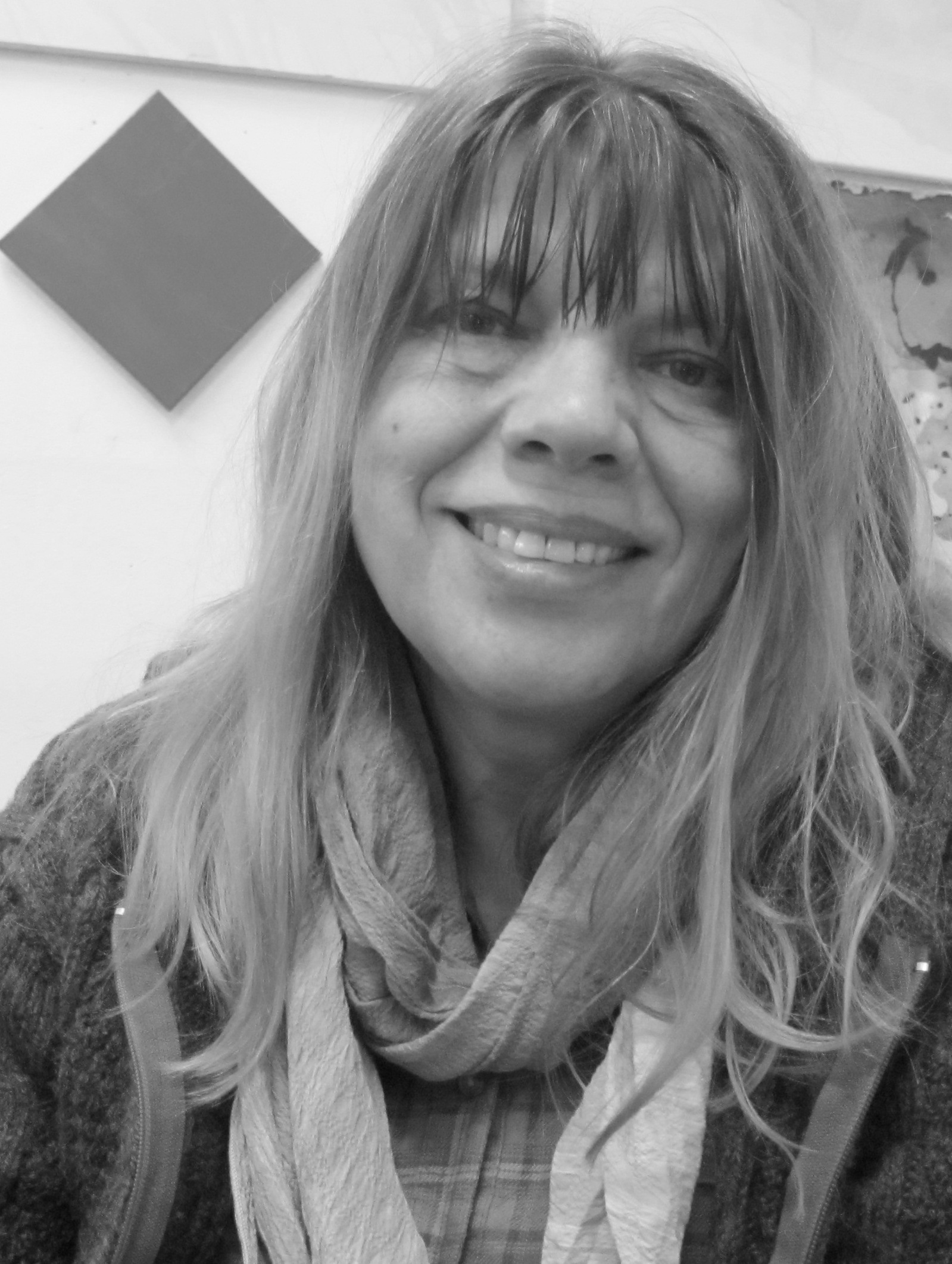
- Ženatá in 2015
- Born: Kamila Přibáňová; 26 December 1953; Havlíčkův Brod
- Occupation: Painter, graphic artist, art curator, teacher

Signature
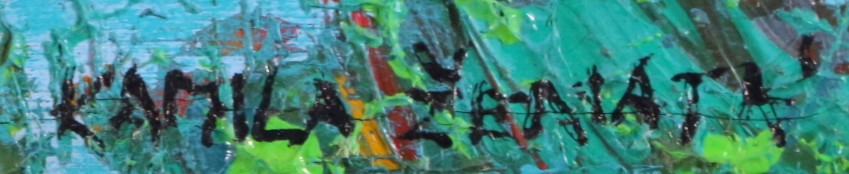

Kamila Ženatá (born 1953) is a Czech artist, known primarily for her video art and installation works.

Ženatá studied at the Academy of Fine Arts, Prague from 1973 until 1979; there she studied under Ladislav Čepelák. She lives and works in Prague. Two prints by Ženatá are in the collection of the National Gallery of Art.
