= Adéla Matasová =

Czech artist

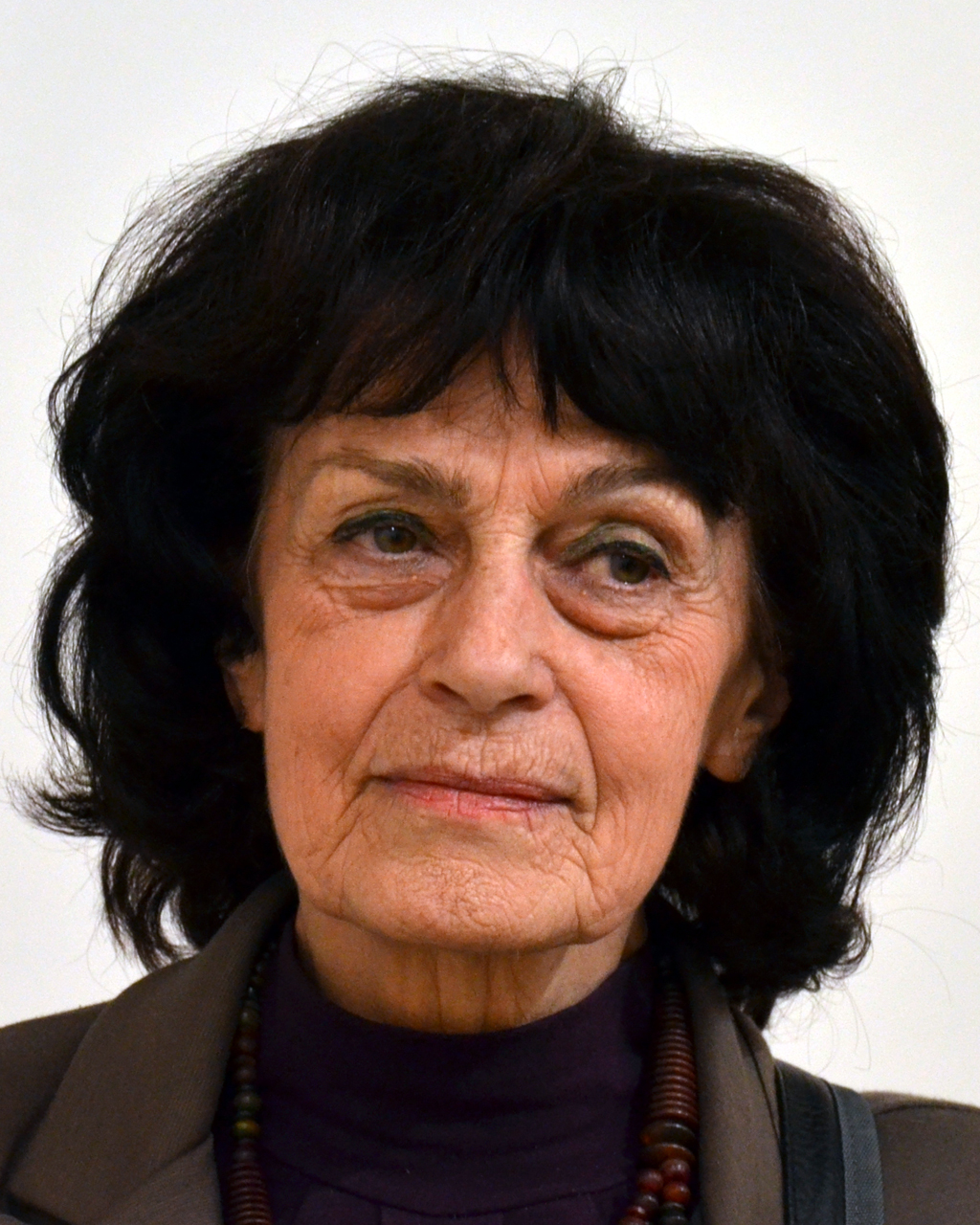
- Born: 26 July 1940 (age 85); Prague, Protectorate of Bohemia and Moravia
- Occupations: Sculptor, Professor at the Art Institute

Adéla Matasová (born 26 July 1940, in Prague) is a Czech sculptor, multimedia artist and professor at the Art Institute.

== Biography ==
Between 1954 and 1958, Matasova attended the Technical College of Interior Design in Prague. In 1958 she started studies at the Department of monumental painting at the Academy of Fine Arts in Prague (headed by prof. V. Sychra) and graduated in 1964. She was awarded the UNESCO grant for a two-month stay in Paris in 1968.

By the second half of the 1960s, her interest focused on sculpture and relief, using synthetic resin as basic material for her objects. These works were presented on individual exhibition in Prague in 1970.

In 1974, she was invited to prepare a performance project (on music composed by E. Varese) in Ceské Budejovice.

By the second half of the 1970s Matasova found new possibility and challenge in work with crude paper mass. Her paper reliefs combined with pencil drawing were awarded a prize at the Biennial of Drawing in Rijeka in 1982.

Since 1985, she has been using crude unprocessed flax paper mass for sculptural projects, where objects often hanged freely in space. Her interest in motion and its activation led to the construction of first kinetic objects, presented at Prague exhibition in 1986. During the same year her work was presented at the Art Basel, at the CIAE Chicago in 1987, and at the Czech Art Festival in New York City in 1994.

The latter artistic activity finally prevailed and led to various installations defining space by the plastic shapes and sound. Sound installations were presented subsequently in Prague, Ustí nad Labem, Klatovy and Brno.

Her new works often combine metal plates with rods or employ steel mirrors. In 1993 she took part in the 3rd Minos Beach symposium in Crete, Greece, and in the International Symposium of Enamel in Filakovo, Slovakia.

Her works are represented at the National Gallery in Prague and other galleries in the Czech Republic and abroad, as well as in private collections in Germany, the United States, Sweden and Poland.

In 1990, she was appointed a professor at the Department of alternative techniques at the Academy of Applied Arts in Prague (till 2003). She spent one year (2000) as a visiting professor at the Department of Art at the University of Colorado, Boulder, US. Since 2004, she was appointed a vice-chancellor for art at the Literary academy of Josef Skvorecky in Prague, Czech Republic until 2005. At present, she is professor at the Institute of Art and Design in Pilsen .

She lives and works in Prague in the Czech Republic.

== Selected works ==
- Talk to me, Museum Kampa, Prague (2008)
- The kinetic object "Illumination" /350×350 cm/, Star Summer house hall, Prague (2005).
- Interspaces, Gallery Montanelli, Prague, (2005) /kinetic objects/
- Fictitious projects, Spala gallery, Prague (2001) /kinetic objects, manipulated computerized photography/
- Kinetic objects, Manes, Prague (2000) /elastic membrane/
- Rain wall, Klenová castle, Work of Art in the Public Space (1998) /steel/
- Rain Wall II, Socrates Sculpture Park, New York City (1997) /steel/ Permanent installation – Pratt Institute, Brooklyn, New York (height 7 m).
- Mangers and tombs, Via Art Gallery, Prague (1995) /steel, straw, light/
- Changing places, The World Financial Center, New York City (1994) /steel, aluminium rods/
- Communication III, Old Town Hall Brno, Municipal Gallery, Brno (1993) /steel, mirror steel, sound/
- Communication II, Agios Nikolaos, Crete (1993) /steel, mirror steel/
- Inhabited landscape, Klenová castle, (1989) /steel, mirror steel, wood/
- Situation II, New hall, Brno (1990) /flax mass, wood, rope/
- Situation I, UKDZ Prague (1989) /flax mass, wood, rope/
