= Věra Vovsová =

Czech painter (1912–1998)

Věra Vovsová (1912–1998) was a Czech painter. She was born in Běstvina, but she lived and painted in the Bohemian city of Pardubice, where she found inspiration for many of her paintings. Her artwork usually depicted flowers, but she also painted scenery, e.g. the forest Kaštanka. Despite the beauty of her work, Věra was often disappointed with herself; in her letter named Letter for Friends, she wrote: "I realise that many times, when I came home from exhibitions, and not just those of classical maestros, but even from those of my colleagues, I was full of admiration to them, but full of sadness and disappointment with myself. But after calming down, I always realised that to paint in your own style, not giving in to fashion trends and being yourself is very important and right."

Věra's style was rather simplistic. With a few strokes, she was able to paint a whole tree branch and using a few shades, she drew leaves around it. Some of the backgrounds to her paintings with flowers are darker on the edges, proceeding to a lighter and brighter part around the flowers. Others have a different mix of light colours and shapes in the background. Her paintings of forests are less simplistic and are not too similar to any other artist’s style. Věra did not give names to her paintings, so they are more known by what they depict. For example, some of her nicest paintings are simply known as "Sunflower" or "Yellow Rose."

In 1948, Vovsová was accepted into the circle of artists in Prague and in 1950, she became a member of the Czech Artists Union. The biggest honour was given to her, when she was accepted into the Artists Union (1990), which is a worldwide organisation. Věra Vovsová was married to a Czech composer, František Voves. Together, they sometimes made pictures for music and music for pictures, which was not a common practice.

Věra Vovsová also made paintings to order. Her most popular paintings were those of Kaštanka, which she could draw from her memory. She documented some of her most popular paintings in magazines, but these were not widely sold.
