= Alena Kupčíková =

Czech artist

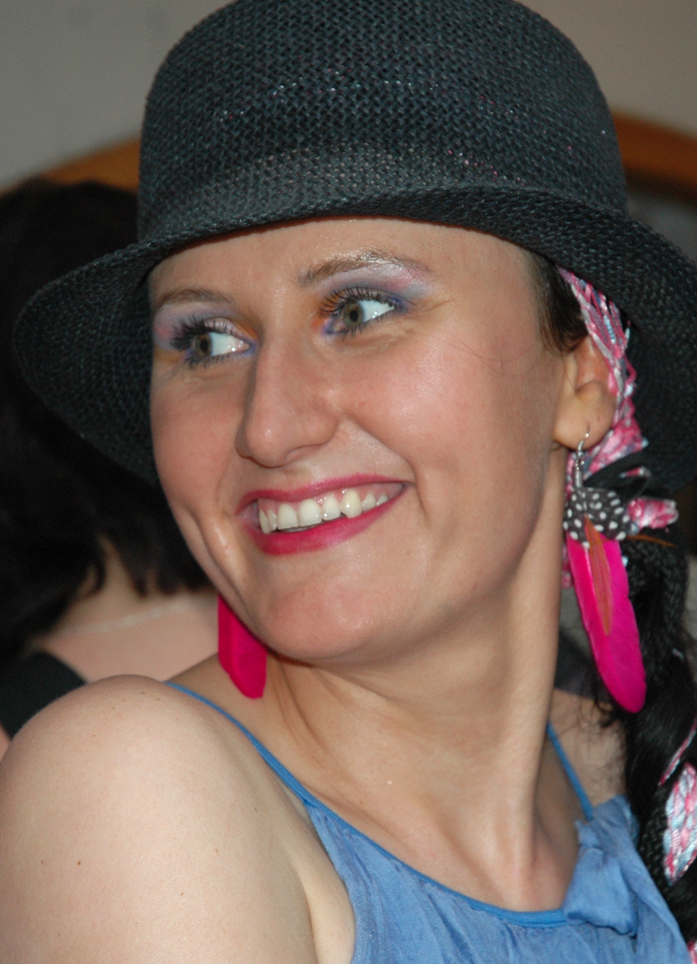
- Born: October 22, 1976 (age 49); Šumperk, Czechoslovakia

Alena Kupčíková (born 22 October 1976) is a Czech artist.

She was born in Šumperk and studied at the Výtvarná škola Václava Hollara in Prague, the Technikon Natal in Durban, the École nationale supérieure des Beaux-Arts in Paris and the Academy of Fine Arts, Prague, receiving a PhD from the latter institution.

She also includes hair from both human and animal sources in her drawings. Her multimedia works also incorporate recordings of various sounds.

Kupčíková is dyslexic and founded a non-profit organization in support of dyslexic children. She created a special multimedia work for dyslexic children which received an award at the 2014 International Exhibition of Inventions (IEIK) in Kunshan.

In 2003, she was awarded a LVMH prize for her work. Kupčíková is a member of the FEMLINK international women's art group which was founded in Paris in 2006.

Her work is included in the collection of the National Gallery in Prague and in private collections in the Czech Republic, Slovakia, Germany, Poland, the Netherlands, England, Switzerland, Japan and the United States.
