= Miloš Šejn =

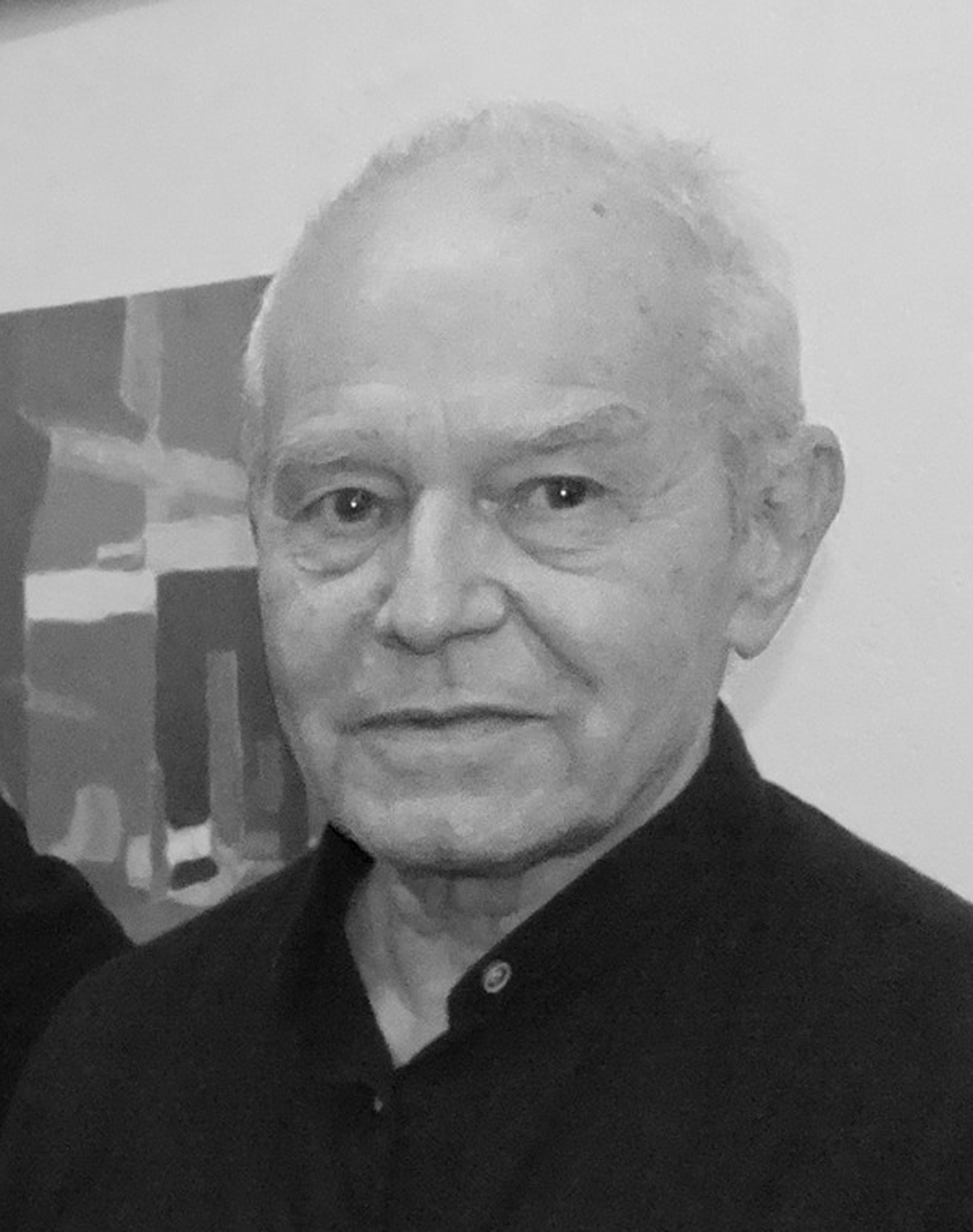
- Miloš Šejn, 2022
- Born: August 10, 1947 (age 79); Jablonec nad Nisou, Czechoslovakia
- Education: Charles University
- Known for: performance, land art, environmental art, drawing
- Movement: Conceptual art, Process art, Intermedia, Performance art
- Website: www.sejn.cz

Miloš Šejn (born 10 August 1947 in Jablonec nad Nisou) is a Czech visual artist, performer, and educator. His work explores the relationship between the human body and landscape and is considered a significant contribution to Czech intermedia art and performance art. He works across a wide range of media, including drawing, painting, photography, performance, experimental film, video, installation, text, and artists' books.

== Biography ==
Šejn was born in Jablonec nad Nisou and has lived in Jičín since childhood. His early interest in natural science, including collecting minerals and observing plants and animals, became a formative influence on his artistic practice.

Between 1962 and 1966, he studied at the Secondary School of Applied Arts, specializing in gem cutting and engraving. From 1970 he studied art history and aesthetics at Charles University, later also studying art education.

From the mid-1970s he worked as a curator at a regional gallery in Hradec Králové. After 1989 he joined the Academy of Fine Arts in Prague, where he led the Studio of Conceptual and later Intermedia Art until 2011.

== Work ==
Šejn's early work includes the series Awake Dreaming (1967–1969), based on brief physical contact between the body and natural materials. These actions introduced key elements of his later practice, including processuality, embodied experience, and site-specific engagement.

In the 1970s and 1980s he developed work using natural pigments, imprints, and drawing in landscape settings, alongside photography and experimental film. He also produced abstract landscape paintings, such as the cycle Ravine (1978–1981).

From the mid-1980s his work shifted toward process-based forms grounded in direct interaction between body and environment. During this period he developed a long-term line of processual images, combining drawing, gesture, time, and natural materials. These works function as records of physical presence in the landscape and remain a continuous aspect of his practice.

Drawing plays a central role in his work as a tool for perception and recording, often combined with text, collected materials, photography, film, and bodily action. These elements form complex structures linking place, time, and embodied experience.

After 1989 he expanded his practice to include public performances and multimedia projects. In this period he also entered into dialogue with the international environmental art scene, including connections with The Harrison Studio, whose work similarly explores relationships between art and landscape.

In 1991 he presented work at the Milano Poesia festival. In the 1990s he created projects combining image, body, sound, and space, including work at the Plasy Monastery in 1994.

Between 2008 and 2014 he realized Solar Mountain, a large-scale land art project integrating landscape intervention, architecture, water, light, and sound.

== Themes and intermedia practice ==
Šejn's work is closely connected to specific landscapes, particularly the Bohemian Paradise and the Krkonoše Mountains. It is characterized by repeated returns to particular sites and their long-term exploration through drawing, photography, writing, film, collection, and performance.

In his approach, landscape is not treated as a static subject but as a process emerging from the interaction between body, memory, perception, and environment. Temporality and physical experience are therefore central aspects of his practice.

A defining aspect of Šejn's work is its intermediality. Rather than treating individual media as separate disciplines, his practice allows drawing, painting, photography, experimental film and video, text, sound, bodily movement, performance, and spatial installation to overlap and operate within a single artistic process. Artlist identifies intermediality as an important element of his work and emphasizes his use of visual media together with text, words, bodily movement, and processes of perception and consciousness.

The intermedia character of Šejn's work is closely connected with its processual nature. A single work may begin as a bodily action in a particular landscape and continue through drawing, photography, film, sound, writing, collected natural material, or installation. The resulting work therefore often exists not as one isolated object but as a constellation of mutually connected forms.

An important element of his practice is also the collection and classification of natural materials. These assemblages often form structures reminiscent of historical cabinets of curiosities and can be understood as archives of perception. Equally significant is a line of processual installations working with natural pigments, specific sites, and the artist's body.

Šejn's work consequently intersects with land art, environmental art, body art, performance art, and intermedia art, while resisting confinement to any single one of these categories.

== Teaching ==
After 1989 Šejn taught at the Academy of Fine Arts in Prague, where he led the Studio of Conceptual and later Intermedia Art.

His teaching emphasized individual experience, direct engagement with the environment, experimentation, and interdisciplinary approaches. He encouraged work in landscape and the integration of visual art with sound, text, film, movement, and performance. His studio contributed to the development of post-1989 intermedia approaches in Czech art.

== Reception ==
Šejn's work has been discussed by several Czech art historians and critics. Ladislav Kesner interprets his practice as a form of “being landscape”, emphasizing embodied perception and sensory engagement.

Kesner also highlights the processual nature of his work, particularly in relation to drawing and temporality.

Věra Jirousová emphasizes the importance of his collections of natural materials and their relation to cabinet-like structures.

Jiří Valoch points to the interconnection of photography, drawing, and artists' books as central media in his work.

== Selected works ==
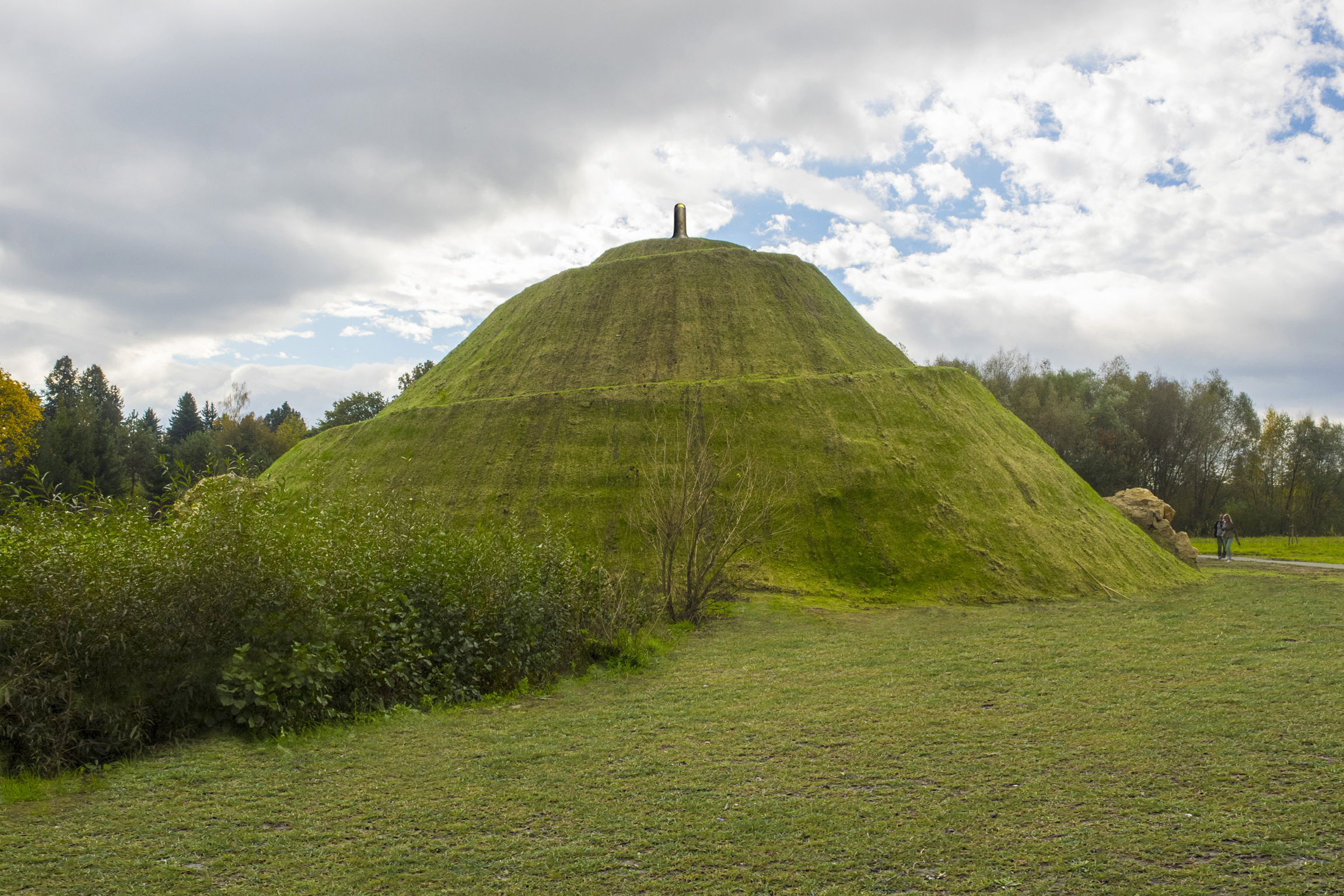
Miloš Šejn, Solar Mountain, 2014, earthwork, Horka u Olomouce, Czech Republic

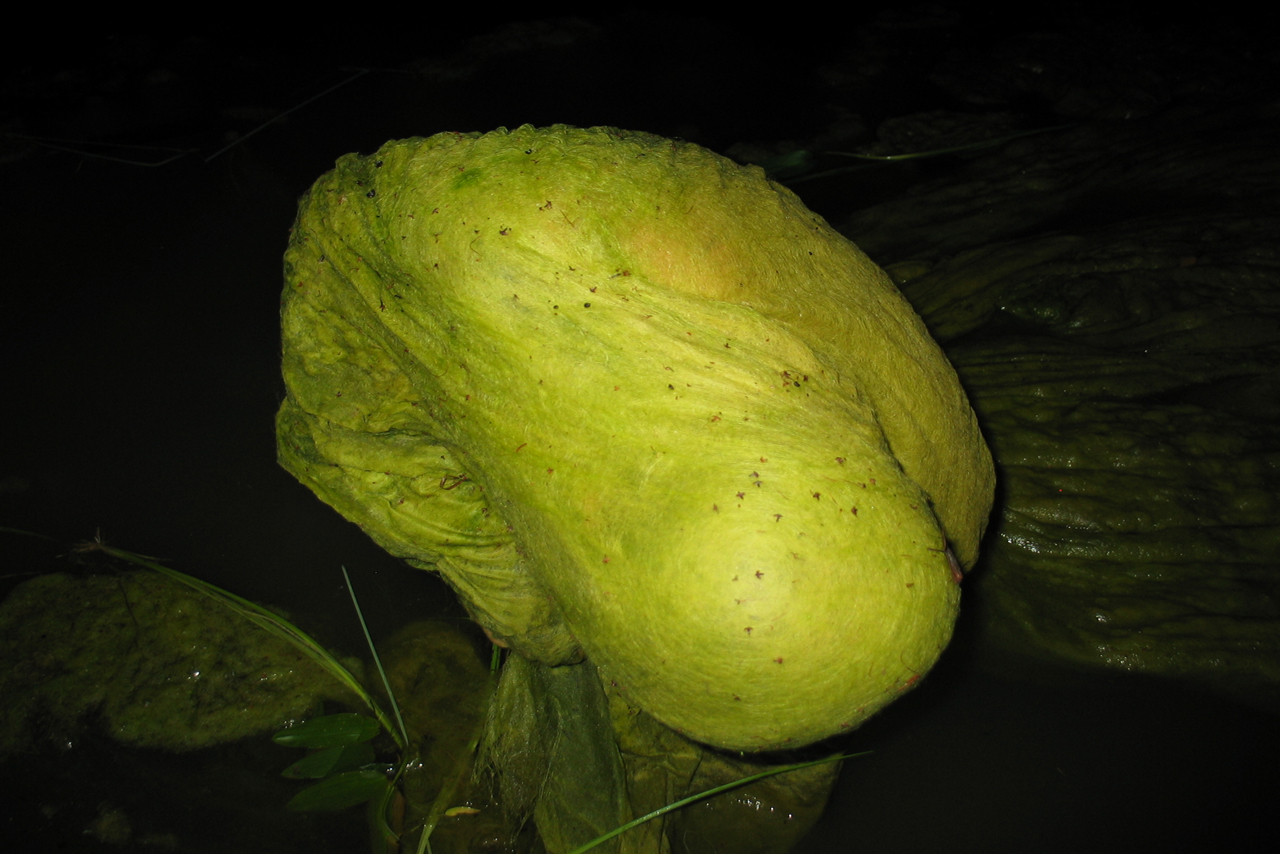
Miloš Šejn, Green Man, 2003, performance

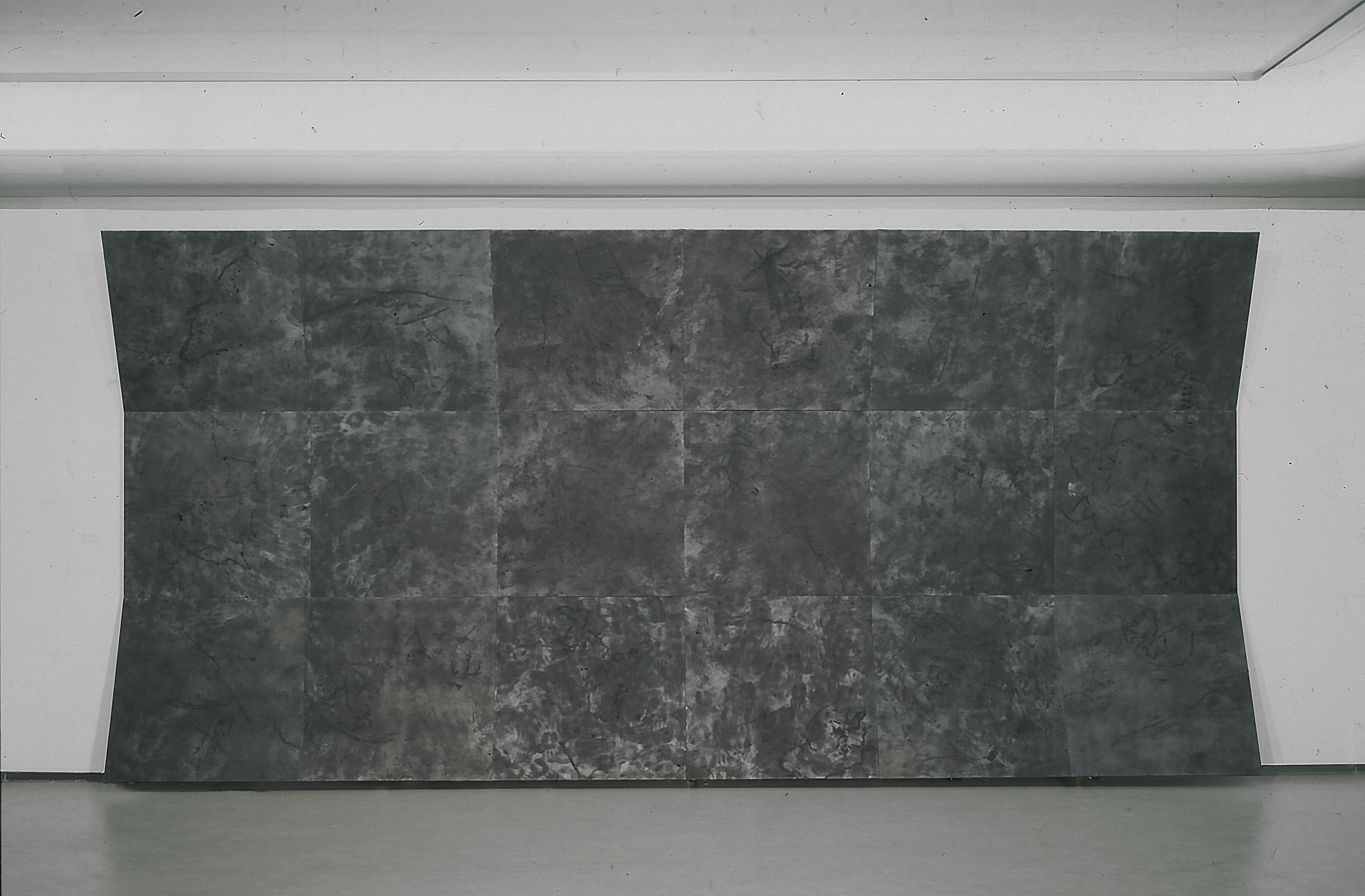
Miloš Šejn, Big Skin, 1995, installation (natural pigments, sound), ifa Galerie, Berlin, Germany
- Awake Dreaming (1967–1969)
- Ravine (1978–1981)
- Demarcation of Space by Fire (1982)
- Falling Sun (1983)
- Processual pigment works and installations (from the mid-1980s)
- Colorum Naturae Varietas (1999)
- St. Anne I–II (2000–2003)
- Green Man (2003–2004)
- Solar Mountain (2008–2014)
