= Eva Koťátková =

Czech installation artist and film maker (born 1982)

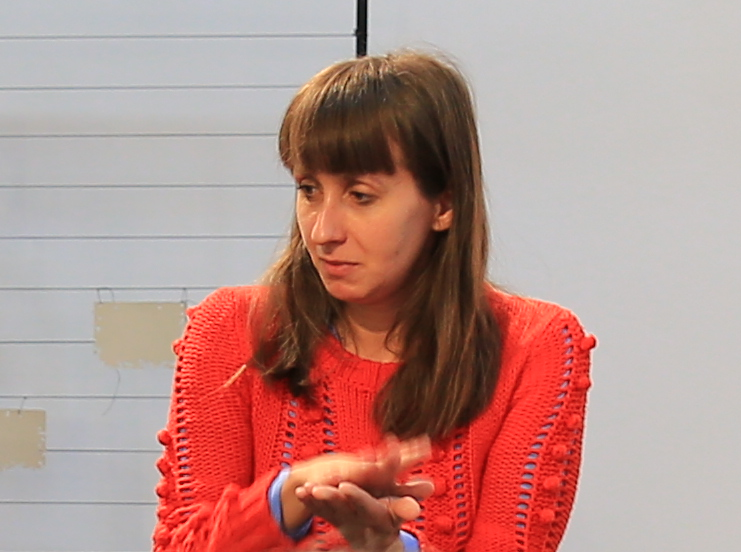
- Eva Koťátková (2016)
- Born: 1 September 1982 (age 43); Prague, Czechoslovakia

Eva Koťátková (born 1 September 1982) is a Czech installation artist and film maker.

== Biography ==
Eva Koťátková was born on 1 September 1982 in Prague.

In 2007 Koťátková obtained her degree from the Academy of Fine Arts, Prague and went on the study at the Academy of Applied Arts in Prague as well as the San Francisco Art Institute. Her installation Asylum was included in the 2013 Venice Biennale. Her work was exhibited at the 2015 New Museum Triennial. Her work has also been shown at the Metropolitan Museum of Art, and the Kunsthal Charlottenborg. Her 2014 work, Untitled, is in the collection of the Museum of Modern Art.

In 2014 Koťátková was the recipient of the Dorothea von Stetten Art Award. She lives and works in Prague.
