= Jitka Štenclová =

Czech painter and textile artist

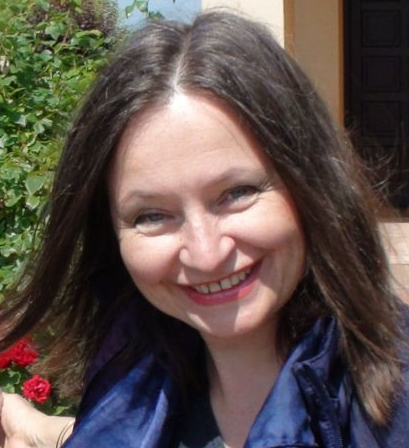
Jitka Štenclová

Jitka Štenclová (born 10 December 1952) is a Czech painter and textile artist, member of famous Czech association of artists Umělecká beseda.

== Early years ==
Štenclová was born in Opava. She graduated at High School of Art and Industrial Design in Prague (Střední umělecko-průmyslová škola v Praze) 1968-1972 (painting with Alois Vitík) and Academy of Art and Industrial Design (Vysoká škola umělecko-průmyslová v Praze, UMPRUM), 1972-1977 (textile with Bohuslav Felcman).

== Career ==
Her works were presented at many individual and group exhibitions in the Czech Republic (e.g., in Mánes 2009) and abroad (London 1972, Annecy 1978, Brussels 1985, Gothenburg 1989, Audabiac 2004, Hamburg 2009, 2010) etc.

She is represented in the National Gallery in Prague, in Powerhouse in Sydney (Australia), as well as in royal collections of the Royal Museums of Art and History (Musées Royaux d'Art et d'Histoire) in Brussels.

== Recognition ==
In 1982 she was awarded with 2nd Prize at 3rd Quadrienale of Art and Handicraft in Erfurt (Germany) and in 2005 she received the Prize "Beams of Humanity" for her significant contribution to the project "Through Art to Freedom", which is focused on children from orphan houses. She regularly contributes to humanitarian auctions (known as Konto bariéry, now part of Charter 77 Foundation etc.).

== Family ==
She is married to Cyril Höschl. She has four children and eleven grandchildren. She lives and works in Prague.

== See also ==
- List of Czech painters
