= Jaroslava Severová =

Czech printmaker

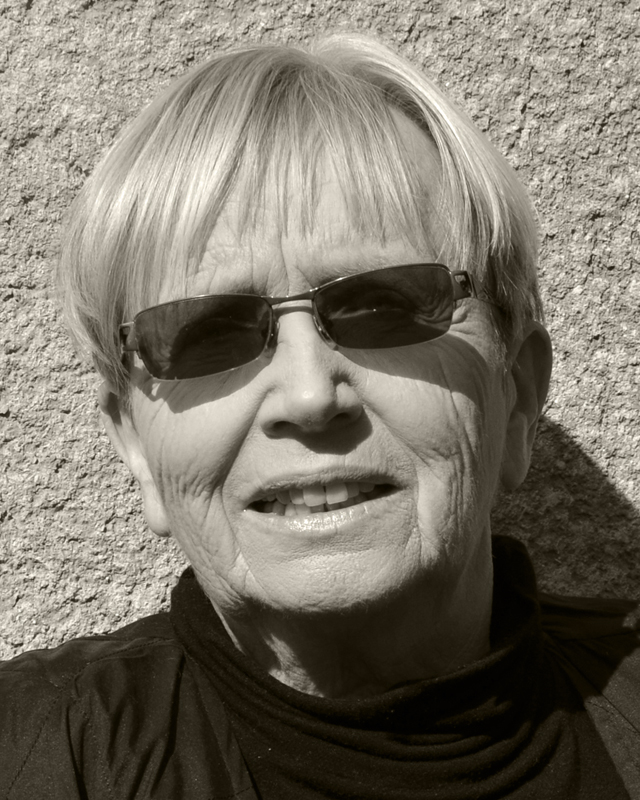
Jaroslava Severová in 2014

Jaroslava Severová (born 1 April 1942) is a Czech printmaker.

A native of Prague, Severová studied at the Academy of Fine Arts in that city from 1960 until 1966. From 1992 until 2007 she was on the architectural faculty of the Czech Technical University in Prague. She has taught at the University of Hradec Králové since 2005. Four of her prints are in the collection of the National Gallery of Art.
