= Hana Storchová =

Czech painter and printmaker (1936–2024)

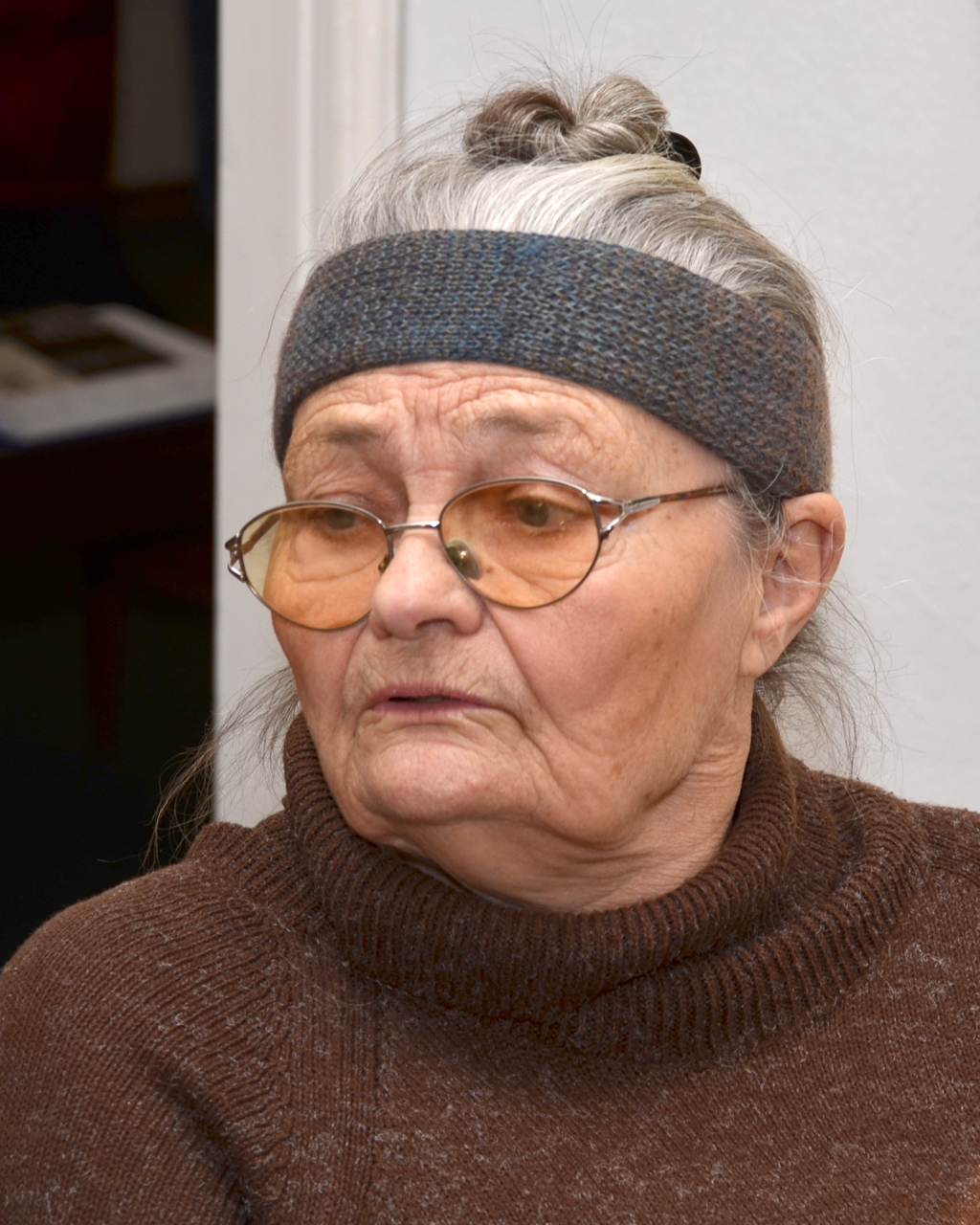
Hana Storchová in 2017.

Hana Storchová (14 September 1936 – 25 April 2024) was a Czech painter and printmaker.

A native of Prague, Storchová began studying drawing while in secondary school. She graduated from that city's Academy of Fine Arts, at which she had studied drawing, in 1960. In addition to painting and printmaking, she has been active as an illustrator. Four of her works, three prints and an illustrated book, are in the collection of the National Gallery of Art.

Storchová died on 25 April 2024, at the age of 87.
