= Milena Šoltészová =

Czech printmaker

Milena Šoltészová (born 28 November 1939) is a Czech printmaker.

A native of Prague, Šoltészová studied at the Academy of Fine Arts in that city under Vojtěch Tittelbach, Antonín Pelc, and Ladislav Čepelák from 1961 until 1967. Later she took a course in art restoration as well. She joined the artists' organization Hollar in 1991. She has been active as an illustrator as well as printmaker, and favors mainly gravure techniques such as etching, aquatint, and drypoint.

A print by Šoltészová from 1990, Dve lahve/Two Bottles in drypoint and aquatint in blue and black on wove paper, is owned by the National Gallery of Art.
