= Charlotta Burešová =

Czech painter and Holocaust survivor (1904–1983)

- Born: 4 November 1904; Prague, Bohemia, Austria-Hungary
- Died: 1983 (aged 78–79); Prague, Czechoslovakia
- Education: Academy of Fine Arts in Prague
- Occupations: Painter and Holocaust survivor
- Notable work: The Last Flamenco
- Children: 1
- Relatives: Dagmar Burešová (daughter-in-law)

Charlotta Burešová (née Kompertová, 4 November 1904 – 1983), also known as Lotka, was a Czech Jewish painter and Holocaust survivor. Her watercolour portrait paintings recorded imprisonment in the Theresienstadt Ghetto.

== Biography ==
Burešová was born on 4 November 1904 in Prague, Bohemia, Austria-Hungary, where her father Gustav Kompert was employed as a tailor. She was also known as Lotka. She studied at the Industrial Art School and at the Academy of Fine Arts in Prague.

In 1924, Burešová married Christian lawyer Radim Bureš and they had a son together in 1927, called Radim after his father. In March 1939, Buresova divorced her husband in the hope of protecting their half-Jewish son from antisemitic persecution under Nazi occupation.

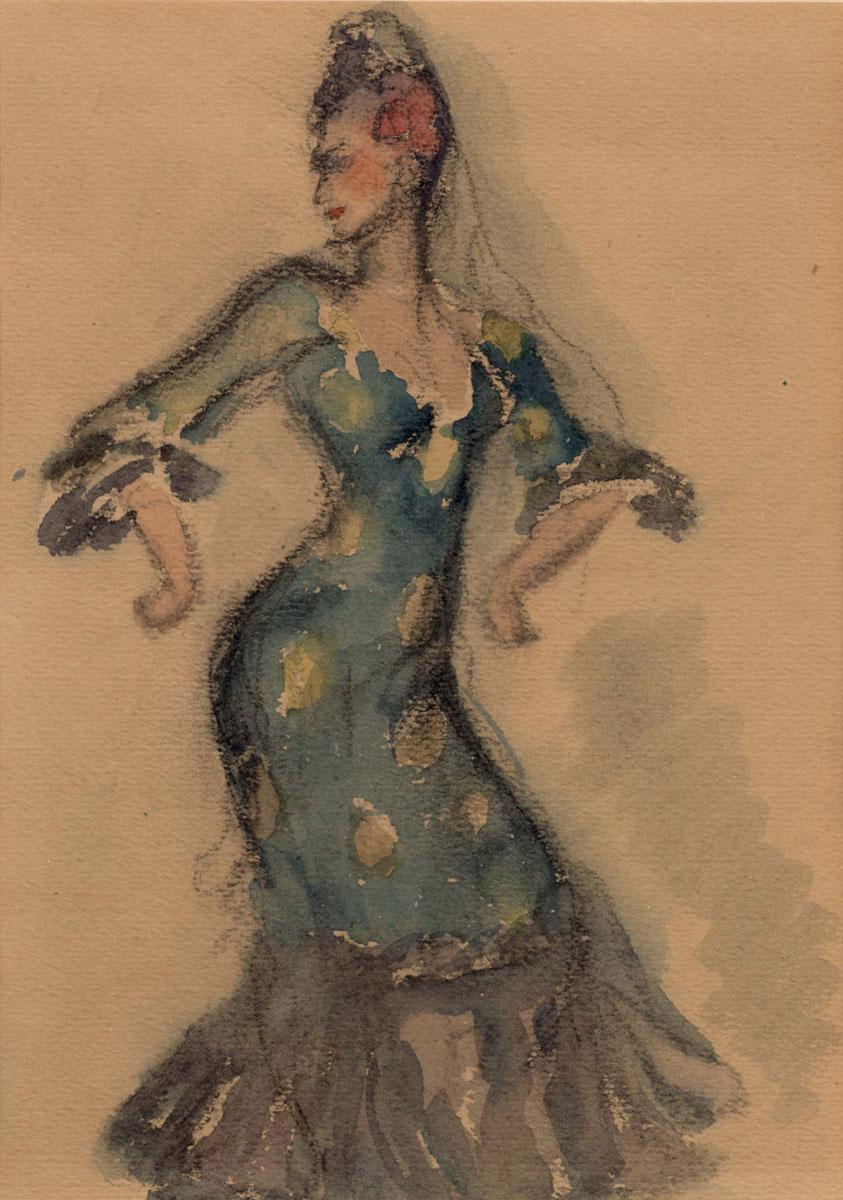
The Last Flamenco by Charlotta Burešová, depicting Dutch Jew Catharina Brücker while imprisoned in the Theresienstadt Ghetto. Brücker survived the Holocaust

Burešová was interned in the Theresienstadt Ghetto from 20 July 1942. While in the ghetto, she was forced to work at the Lautscher Werkstätte producing postcards, greeting cards and copies of works painted by the Old Masters, particularly by Peter Paul Rubens and Rembrandt. These were sold outside of the ghetto by the Nazis, who kept the proceeds. Her colleagues in the Lautscher Werkstätte included Otto Kaufmann–Karas, Hana Kellnerová, Jo Spier and Jiří Valdštýn–Karlínský.

Burešová's bright watercolour portrait paintings recorded children, dancers, musicians and flowers in the ghetto, in contrast to the conditions and suffering around her. They were hidden until after the end of World War II. She received art supplies and food parcels from her former husband and also drew with charcoal. Burešová said in an interview for Terezín Memorial in 1972 that "one of the gendarmes (his name was Čipera) even mediated contact with my husband. I burnt all those secret letters in Terezín [Theresienstadt], while my husband has kept the secret messages from me."

Two of Burešová's maternal aunts died in Theresienstadt. Her seven-year old niece Zuzana Neuwirthová also died in the ghetto in 1943, from typhus. Burešová was made to paint a portrait of Karl Rahm, the Schutzstaffel (SS) commandant of the ghetto, and due to this she was excluded from transport to Auschwitz concentration camp in 1944 and survived the war.

After liberation from the ghetto on 3 May 1945, Burešová returned to Prague and remarried her husband. She worked illustrating school textbooks and books on psychological and educational themes. Burešová gradually lost her eyesight in her 70s. She died in 1983 in Prague.

Burešová's work The Last Flamenco is held in the permanent art exhibition at Israel's Yad Vashem. Over fifty of her works from the ghetto and three of her post-war works are held in the Terezín Memorial’s art collections.
