= Ludmila Janovská =

Chech painter

- Born: 14 September 1907; Split, Austria-Hungary
- Died: date unknown (after 1962)
- Education: Academy of Fine Arts in Prague (BA)
- Alma mater: Academy of Fine Arts in Prague
- Occupations: painter, litographer
- Relatives: Ludmila Kleinmondová (mother); Jan Karel Janovský (father)

Ludmila Janovská, also known as Mila Janovská (14 September 1907 – after 1962), was a Czech painter.

== Early life ==
Ludmila Janovská was born on 14 September 1907 in Split into an artistic family. Her mother was the Czech painter Ludmila Kleinmondová (1870–1955), and her father was the Czech painter Jan Karel Janovský (1869–1931). She was an only child.

In 1908, she moved with her family to Sušak, where her parents worked as painters, taught painting, and explored Croatian folk motifs. After 1918, the family relocated to Maribor, where her parents became members of the Grohar art club in 1920. During this period, the family faced financial difficulties. In 1926, they moved to the Smíchov district of Prague, where her parents opened a private painting school.

== Career ==
In 1929, she began studying at the Academy of Fine Arts in Prague. She studied painting under the Czech painter Vratislav Nechleba (1885–1965). In 1931, her father died suddenly, leaving her to live alone with her mother until her mother's death in 1955. She graduated university in 1935.

After completing her studies, she lived and worked in the Smíchov district of Prague. She primarily painted portraits, flowers, and still lifes. She also painted several winter scenes of Prague.

One of her most highly regarded works is the portrait of Czech actor and director Jaroslav Průcha (1898–1963), titled Jaroslav Průcha režíruje (Jaroslav Průcha Directing), painted in 1953. Among other notable figures she portrayed were her mother, the Czech equestrian and Olympic competitor František Ventura, and the Czech composer Bohuslav Martinů. She also worked in graphic arts, particularly lithography.

She signed her works as PD L. Janovská, Mila Janovská, L. Janovská, or Ludmila Janovská.

== Exhibitions ==
She began exhibiting in 1938 at the Zlín Salon in Prague. She was a member of the artists' group Tvorba. After World War II, she participated in numerous exhibitions, particularly shows of contemporary art.

Between 1949 and 1962, she exhibited at exhibitions organized by the Prague Aleš Association (1946–1968), of which she was a member. She was repeatedly elected to the Federal Committee of the Czechoslovak Artists' Association (SČSV) and also served as its delegate.
