= Věra Kotasová =

Czech painter and printmaker (1939–2019)

- Born: 28 March 1939; Přerov
- Died: 20 April 2019 (aged 80)
- Known for: Painter

Věra Kotasová (28 May 1939 - 20 April 2019) was a Czech painter and printmaker.

Born in Přerov, Kotasová studied at Palacký University Olomouc from 1957 until 1961; she then joined the institution's faculty, teaching there for many years. Her work is represented in the collection of the National Gallery of Art.
