= Marian Korn =

Czech-American printmaker

Marian Korn (February 15, 1914 – February 24, 1987) was a Czech-born American printmaker.

== Biography ==
She was born February 15, 1914, in Chomutov, Austria-Hungary. In 1931, she moved to Prague, and in 1931, she graduated from the Women's College of Prague. She married in 1938, and emigrated to the United States in 1939. In 1949, she moved to Tokyo with her entrepreneur husband Frank and two daughters.

In 1970, Korn accompanied one of her daughters to the atelier of Gaston Petit, where the daughter had been taking lessons. The daughter eventually became an art historian specializing in Japanese art, and, at the age of 56, Korn began her printmaking career by making woodcuts and linocuts.

Her honors included a full membership in Shuyōkai (1984) and an associate membership in Kokugakai (1985). She died in Tokyo on February 24, 1987.

== Oeuvre ==
Infinity by Marian Korn, 1980, Honolulu Museum of Art

Her first prints were representational, often with Japanese themes. By 1974, some were completely abstract, and by 1982, the majority were abstract. Her catalogue raisonné lists a total of 206 prints.

Although etching, in all its variations, remained Marian Korn's favorite technique, she is known for her mastery of, and combined use of, many different methodologies. During her career, she used, either singly or in combination, woodcuts, linocuts, collagraphy, photo-etching, paper embossing, silk-screen, sugar lift, the Hayter method (viscosity printing), and carborundum printmaking. Infinity from 1980, in the collection of the Honolulu Museum of Art, demonstrates the effect she achieved by combining soft ground etching with silk-screen printing.

Harvard University Art Museums, the Honolulu Museum of Art, the National Museum of Art of Romania (Bucharest, Romania), the National Museum of Modern Art, Tokyo, the Setagaya Art Museum (Tokyo), the Tikotin Museum of Japanese Art (Haifa, Israel), and the Petit Format de Papier Collection of the City of Couvin, Belgium, are among the public collections holding prints by Marian Korn.
