= Julie Wimmer =

Czech designer (born 1975)

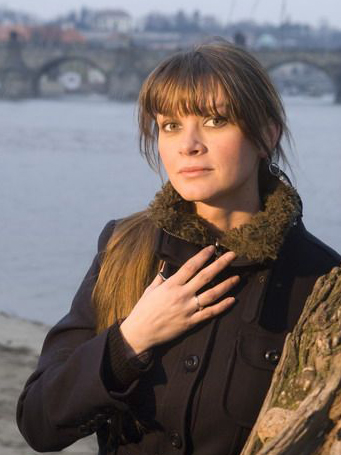
- Born: 18 October 1975 (age 50); Ostrava, Czech Republic
- Education: NABA - Nuova Accademia di Belle Arti, Milan, Italy
- Occupation: Architect
- Practice: Julie Wimmer Design
- Projects: "Unicum pro nobilis" 2006, Collection "Metal Story" 2007, Interior Realization - 2008-2013

Julie Wimmer (born 18 October 1975) is a Czech designer.

== Childhood and early life ==
Julie Wimmer was born in 1975. After graduating from academic high school, she lived and studied for several years in Switzerland and Great Britain. In London, she attended children's book illustration seminars at the Central Saint Martins College of Art and Design. Later she successfully completed post-graduate studies of Interior Design at NABA - Nuova Accademia di Belle Arti in Milan, Italy. Julie Wimmer has fashioned the interiors of houses, apartments and residences worldwide.

== Career ==
Julie Wimmer has drawn on inspiration from the world over – any place she likes, she is at home. She speaks Czech, English, German, Slovak and Polish fluently, as well as some Italian and Russian. Aside from interior design, she has also designed and created jewelry and fashion. In 2006 the FashionOffice internet magazine ranked her among elite fashion designers - / FashionOffice - Julie Wimmer Her collections sparked also attention in Asia, where Phoenix Jewelry Magazine, is a printed and online Chinese fashion magazine, featured an interview with her in 2009. After attending the Master in 2009, Julie resumed the works of her own design studio. The prestigious Italian school NABA (Nuova Accademia di Belle Arti Milano) Julie Wimmer ranked among its most successful graduates - / NABA - Arts and Design Academy in Milan She has led a project team to optimize prices (project preparation, tenders, implementation) in the course of the reconstruction of the Prague TV Tower (Zizkov Television Tower) - 2011. In 2012 Julie has released an interview for National Qatari Television and her work was included in the book "Czech Designers" published in USA in 2010. More than 50 projects completed to date. In addition she is a member of the International Federation of Journalists.

== News reports ==
- Julie Wimmer：珠宝的梦想之旅, Phoenix Magazine Jewelry, China, March 2008.
- Julie Wimmer, gioielli su misura, Blogosphere, October 2007, archived from the original on 26 November 2010.
- Extravagantní kolekce od Julie Wimmer, moda.cz, November 2007, archived from the original on 18 December 2010.
- Nahá Kateřina Hamrová se ozdobila sexy šperky, idnes.cz, January 2007.
