= Dorrit Dekk =

Czech-British graphic designer

- Born: Dorothy Karoline Fuhrmann; 18 May 1917; Brno, Moravia, Austria-Hungary
- Died: 29 December 2014 (aged 97)
- Education: Kunstgewerbeschule, Vienna; Reimann School
- Known for: Graphic design
- Spouse(s): Leonard Klatzow (m. 1940; died 1942) Kurt Epstein (m. 1968; died 1990)

Dorrit Dekk (born Dorothy Karoline Fuhrmann; 18 May 1917 – 29 December 2014) was a Czech-born British graphic designer, printmaker and painter.

== Early life ==
Dekk was born in Brno, Moravia, Austria-Hungary and trained at the Kunstgewerbeschule, Vienna from 1936 to 1938. There she was taught by Otto Niedermoser, the stage designer, and contributed to designs for the theatre and for film director Max Reinhardt. Following the Anschluss in 1938, Dekk - who was Jewish - escaped to London, where she took up a place at the Reimann School through a scholarship arranged by Niedermoser, and specialised in graphic design.

== Career ==
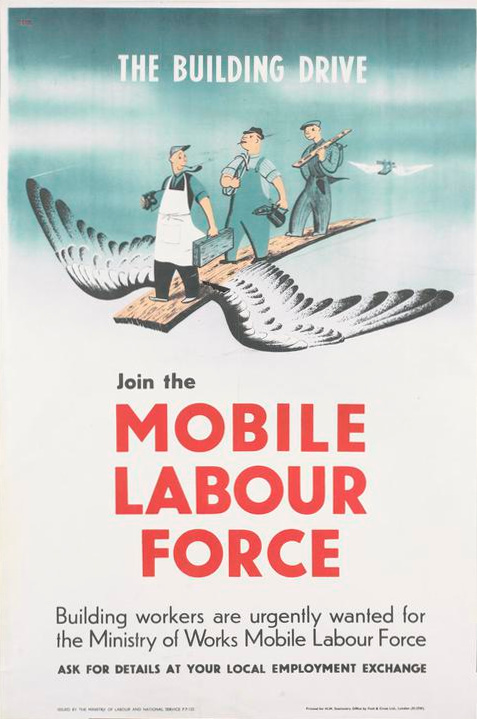
Join the Mobile Labour Force (Art.IWM PST13971)

Following the closure of the Reimann School in 1939, Dekk joined the Women's Royal Naval Service (WRNS) and as a linguist became a radio intelligence officer listening to U-boat communications. As a Y-station 'listener', she intercepted coded messages sent to German naval forces with her hand-written transcripts then being sent to Bletchley Park for deciphering. At the end of the war, she joined the design studio of what was to become the Central Office of Information, working under Reginald Mount. During her two and a half years, she designed numerous government posters, including the iconic Ministry of Health's poster Trap the Germs in Your Handkerchief. Dekk also designed posters for the Ministry of Works post-war re-building programme and for the Polish Resettlement Corps.

Dekk left the Central Office of Information in 1948 to spend a year in Cape Town, where she worked as a stage designer and illustrator. Dekk returned to London in 1950 and established herself as a freelance designer. Her clients included Air France, the Orient Shipping Line (latterly P&O Orient Line), the Post Office Savings Bank, Trust House Forte, Penguin, The Tatler and London Transport. She also worked as a designer for the Travelling Section of the Festival of Britain, creating the mural 'British Sports and Games'. In 1956, she became a Fellow of the Society of Industrial Artists.

Dekk came to be regarded as among the most successful commercial artists of the post-war period in Britain. She retired from her graphic design practice in 1982, but continued to work as a painter and printmaker right up until her death in December 2014.

== Personal life ==
In 1940, Dekk married Leonard Klatzow, a South African physicist. He had a key role in the invention of the cathode-ray tube and infrared night vision for the navy. He died in 1942, following a plane crash. In 1968, she married Kurt Epstein and they remained together until his death in 1990.
