= Academy of Fine Arts in Prague =

Art college in Prague, Czech Republic

- Akademie výtvarných umění v Praze
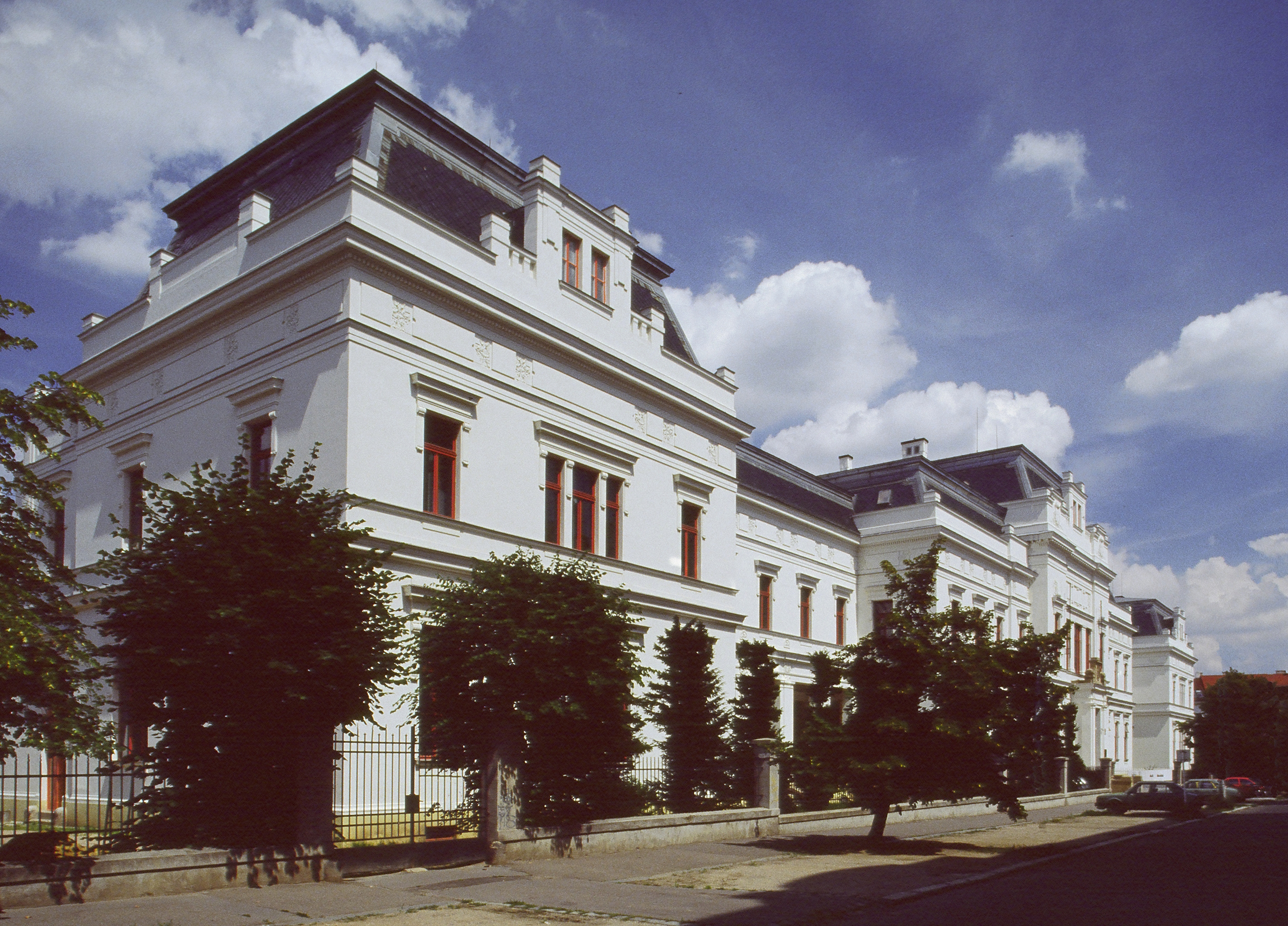
- Academy of Fine Arts in Prague - headquarters
- Type: Public
- Established: 1799; 227 years ago
- Rector: Tomáš Pospiszyl
- Administrative staff: 75 (58 academic staff and 16 researchers)
- Students: 292
- Doctoral students: 35
- Location: Prague, Czech Republic; 50°6′9.95″N 14°25′28.48″E
- Website: avu.cz/en
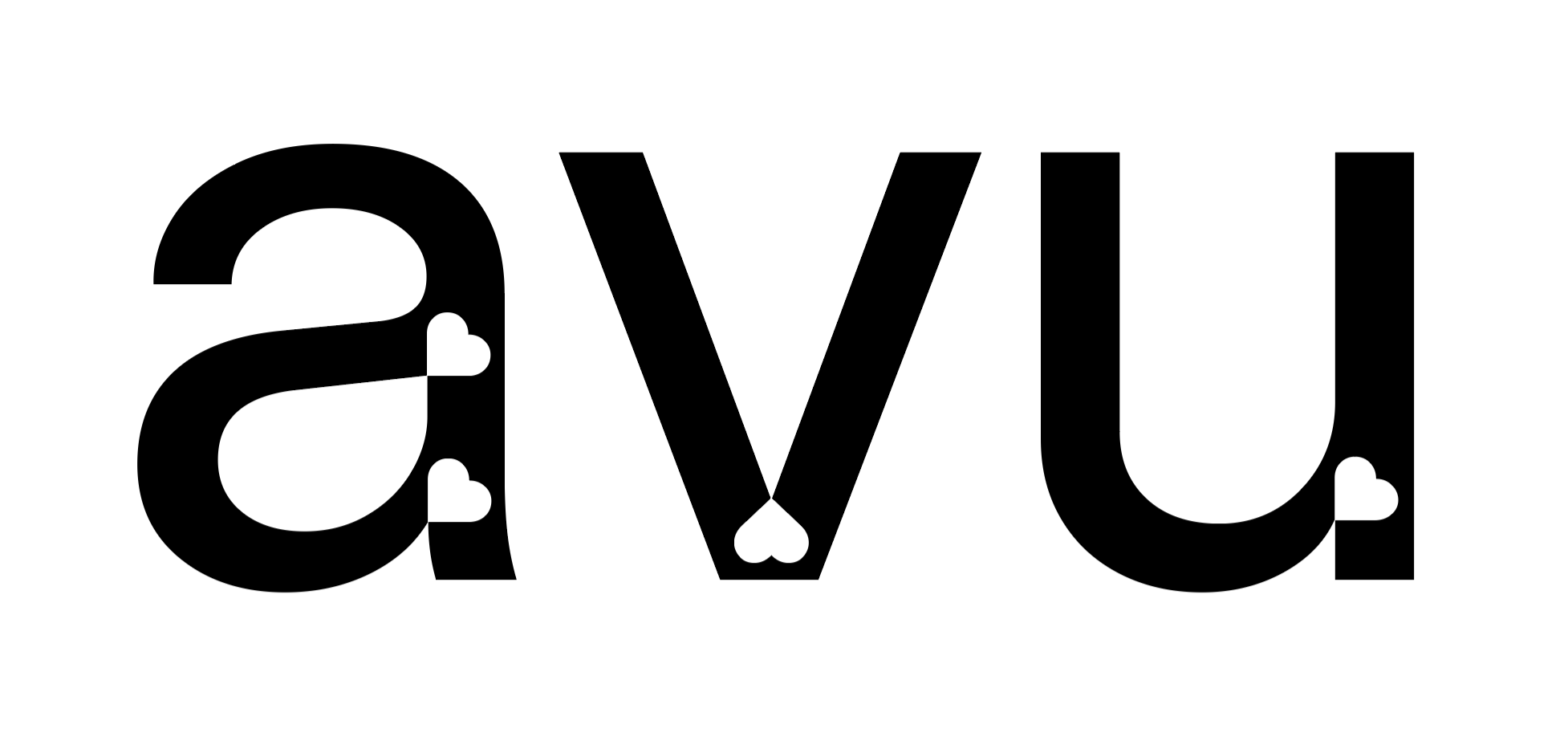

The Academy of Fine Arts in Prague (Czech: Akademie výtvarných umění v Praze; AVU) is an art college in Prague, Czech Republic. Founded in 1799, it is the oldest art college in the country. The school offers twelve master's degree programs and one doctoral program.

== History ==
Starting in the early 18th century, a series of organizations were formed in Prague with an interest in promoting art and education. Thanks in part to their efforts, the Academy of Fine Arts was founded by Imperial Decree on 10 September 1799. Joseph Bergler the Younger was the first director.

It began with instruction in drawing. The academy was gradually expanded to include programs in architecture, painting, printmaking, and sculpture, among others. In 1990 drastic reforms were undertaken by rector Milan Knížák to reorganize the concept and internal structure of the school. By 1991 new media related study programs including film and computer animation were added.

== Today ==
Today, the academy is an accredited university offering an education in modern and historic art. As an exclusively graduate school there are no student accommodation or on-campus eating facilities. International programs are offered in Czech, with a limited number of classes offered in English.

=== Departments ===
Current departments include:

- Architecture
- Art in Context (English program)
- Drawing
- Figural Sculpture and Medal
- Intermedia
- New Media
- Printmaking
- Painting
- Sculpture Restoration

== Notable alumni ==
- Charlotta Burešová
