= Ludvík Kuba =

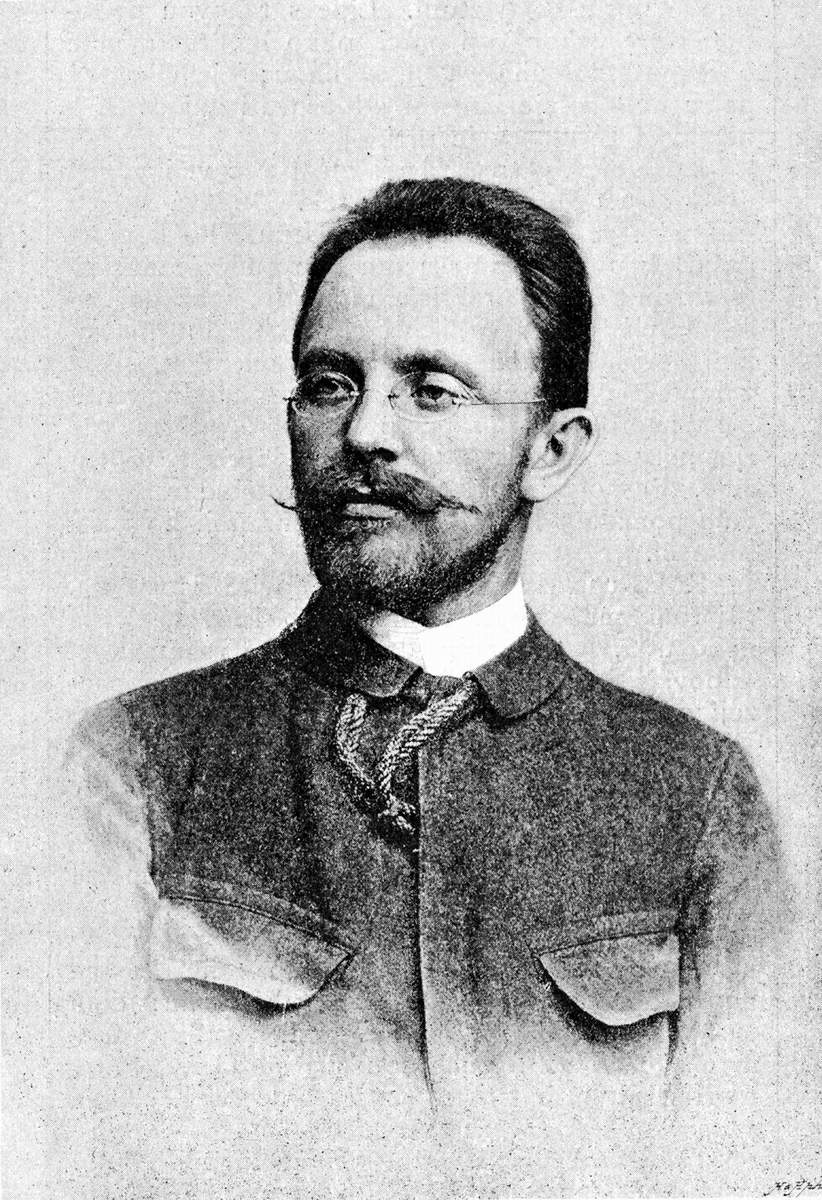
Ludvík Kuba in the 1890s.

Ludvík Kuba (April 16, 1863 in Poděbrady, Bohemia – November 30, 1956 in Prague) was a Czech landscape painter, musician, writer, professor in the Academy of Fine Arts. He was a representative of the Late-Impressionism and he collected folk traditions.

== Life ==
Ludvík Kuba studied to play the organ and privately learnt drawing from Bohuslav Schnirch and Karel Liebscher. He was accepted to the Academy of Fine Arts and educated in the studio of Max Pirner (1891–1893). Then he studied at Académie Julian in Paris (1893–1895) and the school of Anton Ažbe in Munich (1895–1904). He then devoted his life to painting, collecting folk songs (e.g. Slovanstvo ve svých písních - "Slavonic peoples in their songs" recorded 4000 songs) and writing about folk traditions. His artistic style was highly marked with Impressionism and he mainly painted landscapes (his favourite was South Bohemia), portraits (e.g. Josef Svatopluk Machar) and still-lifes (e.g. Red Begonias).

== Travels ==
He traveled through the Balkans, observed local Slavic cultures and wrote in detail about the local customs, history and feeling of the people. Memorable works include travels through Macedonia in Book about Macedonia (1925–1927) and Songs from Bosnia and Herzegovina.

== Gallery ==
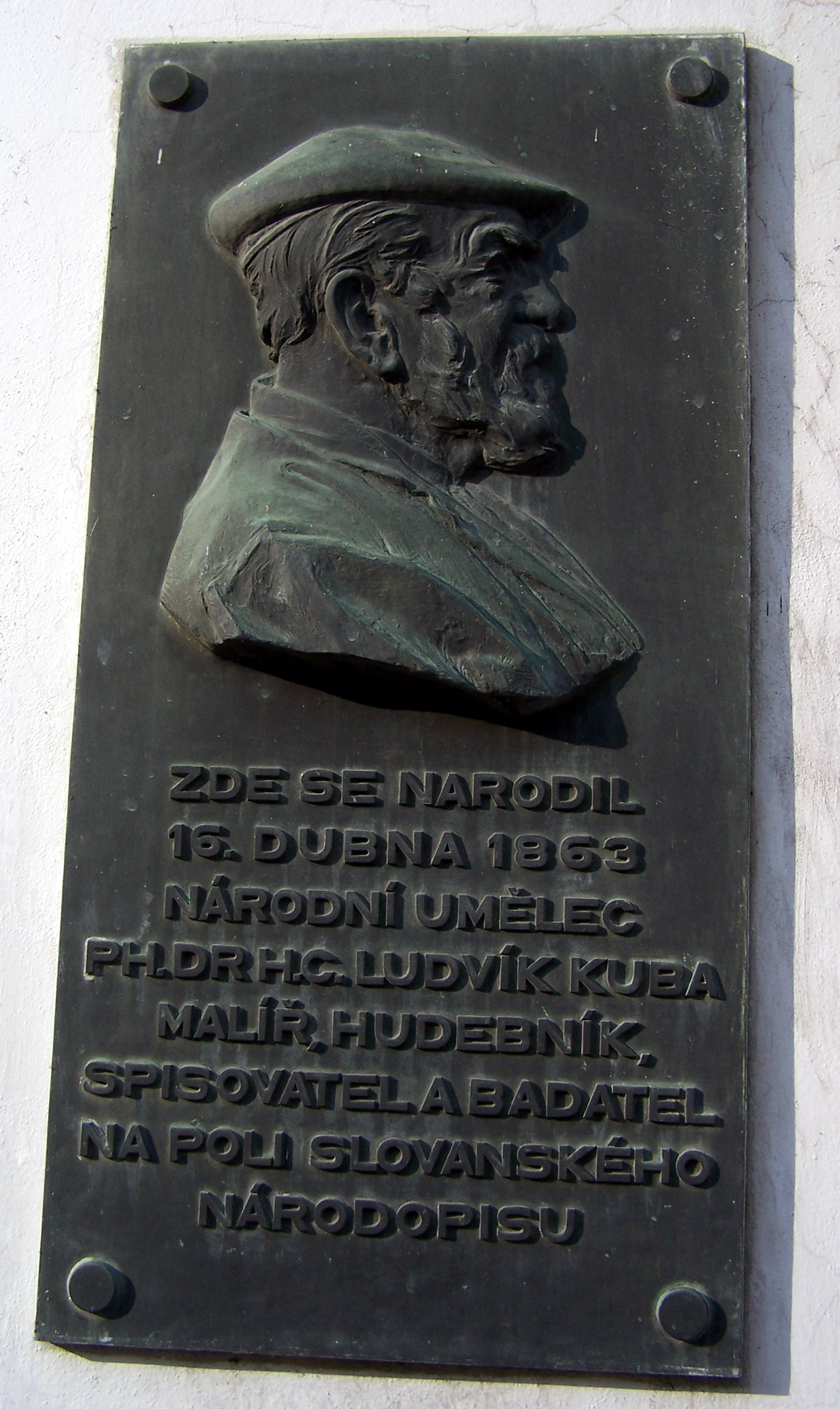
Memorial desk on his birthplace.

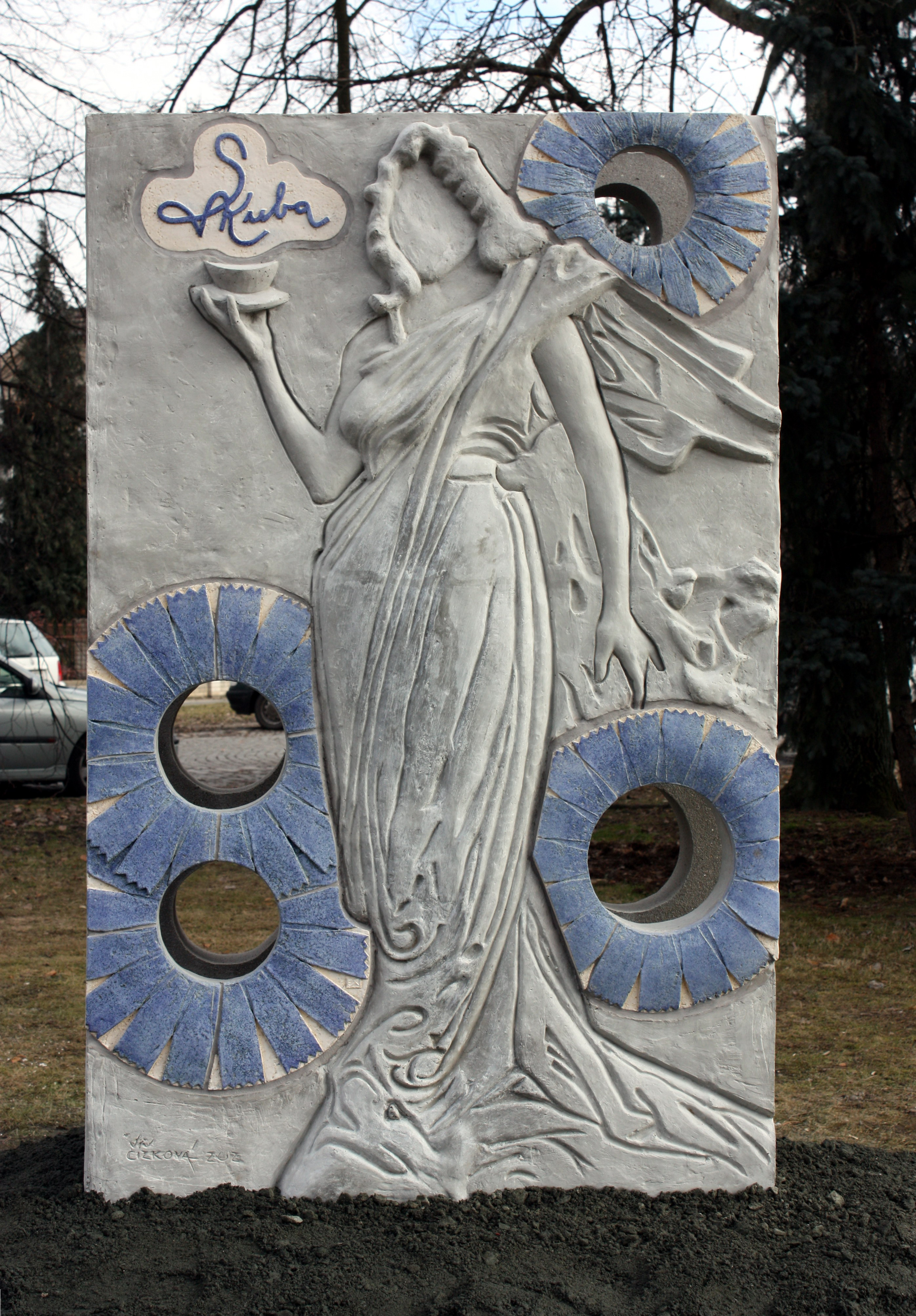
Relief on the motif of his graphic work by contemporary Czech sculptor Zuzana Čížková unveiled in 2013 in Poděbrady.

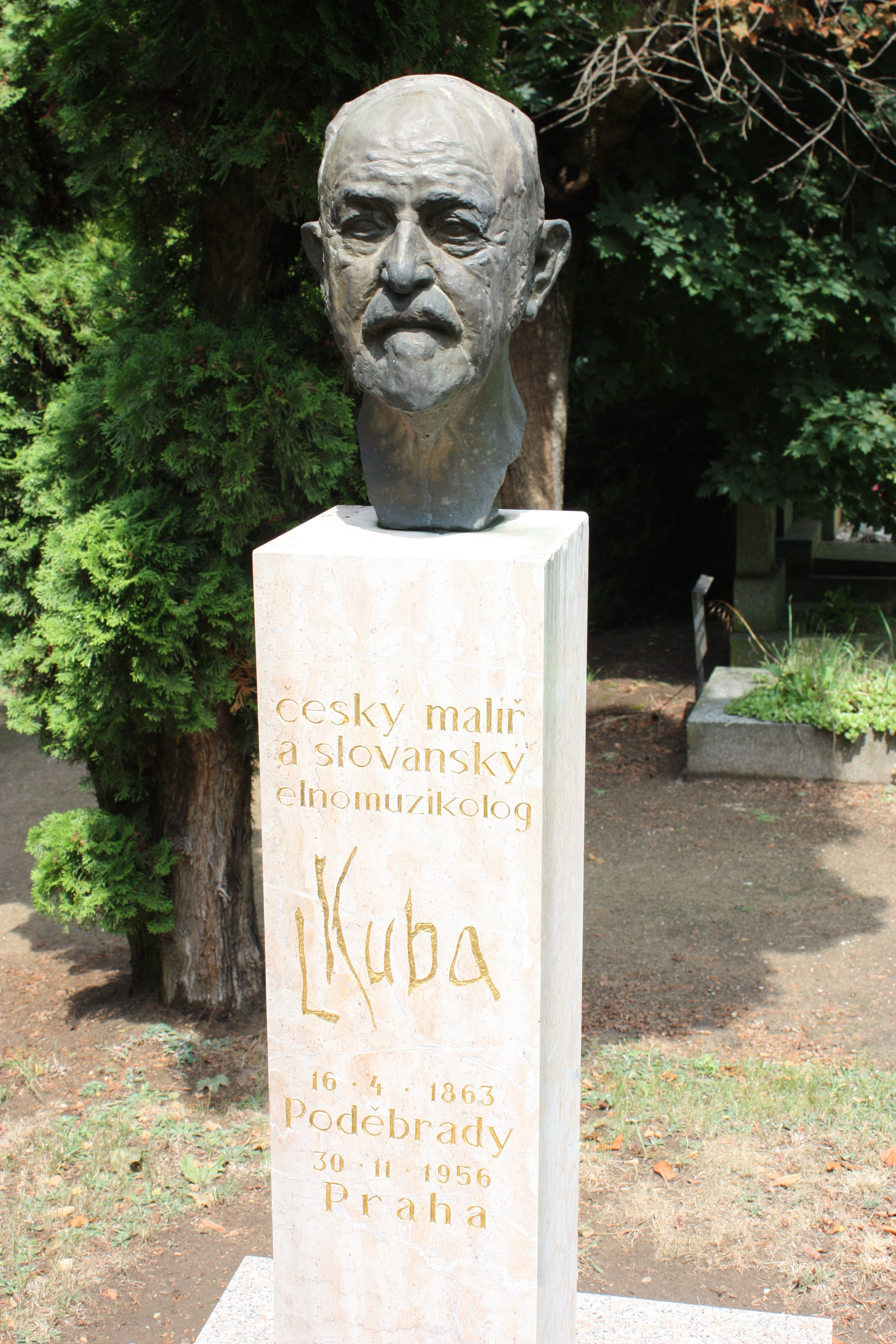
Bust and gravestone in the cemetery in Poděbrady.
