= Zuzana Čížková =

Czech sculptor and painter

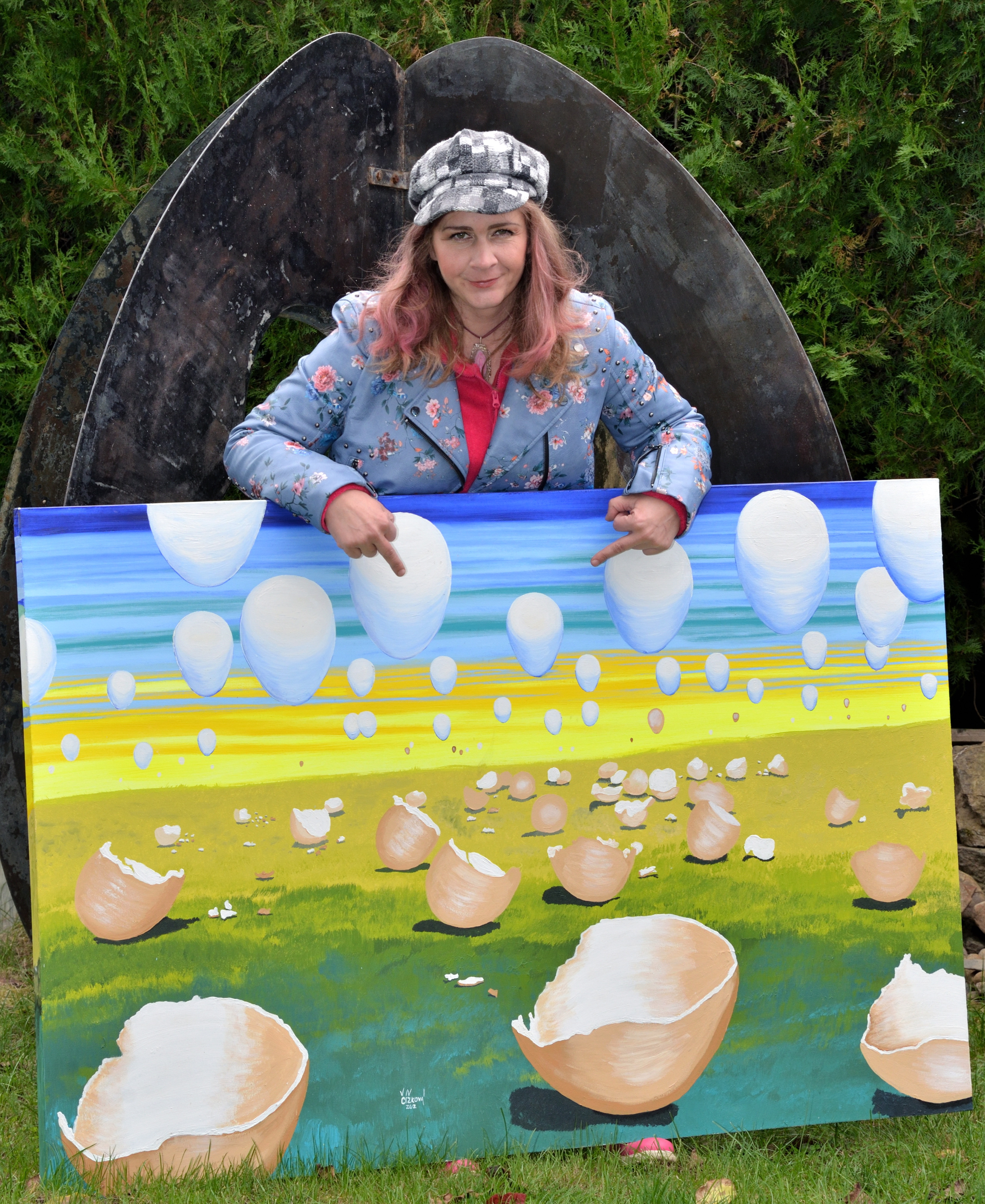
- Born: 10 December 1982 (age 43); Prague, Czechoslovakia
- Education: Academy of Arts, Architecture and Design in Prague
- Known for: sculpture, painting
- Website: www.zuzanacizkova.com

Zuzana Čížková (born 10 December 1982) is a Czech sculptor and painter.

== Biography ==
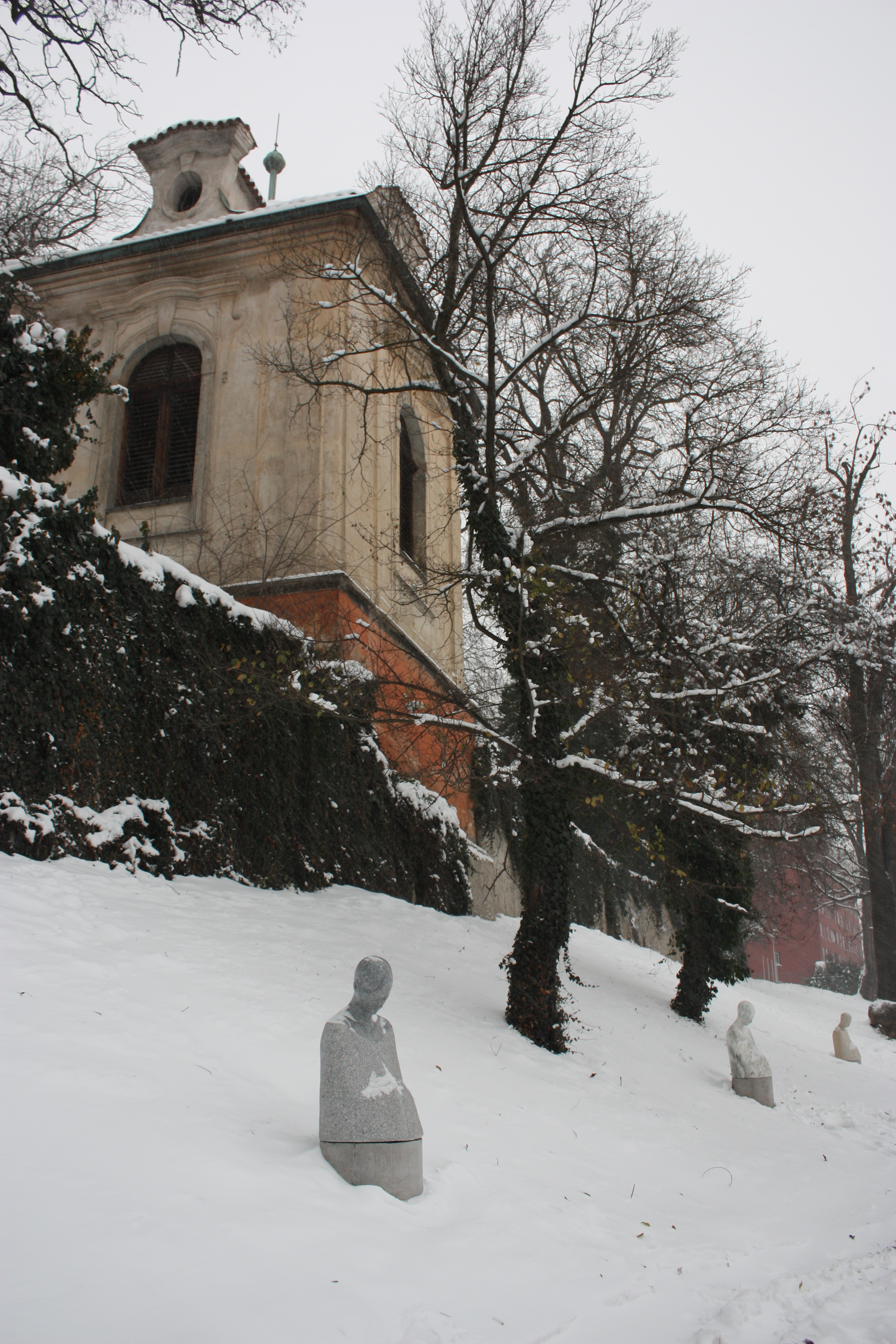
Madonna's Secret - three stone sculptures in Prague-Prosek

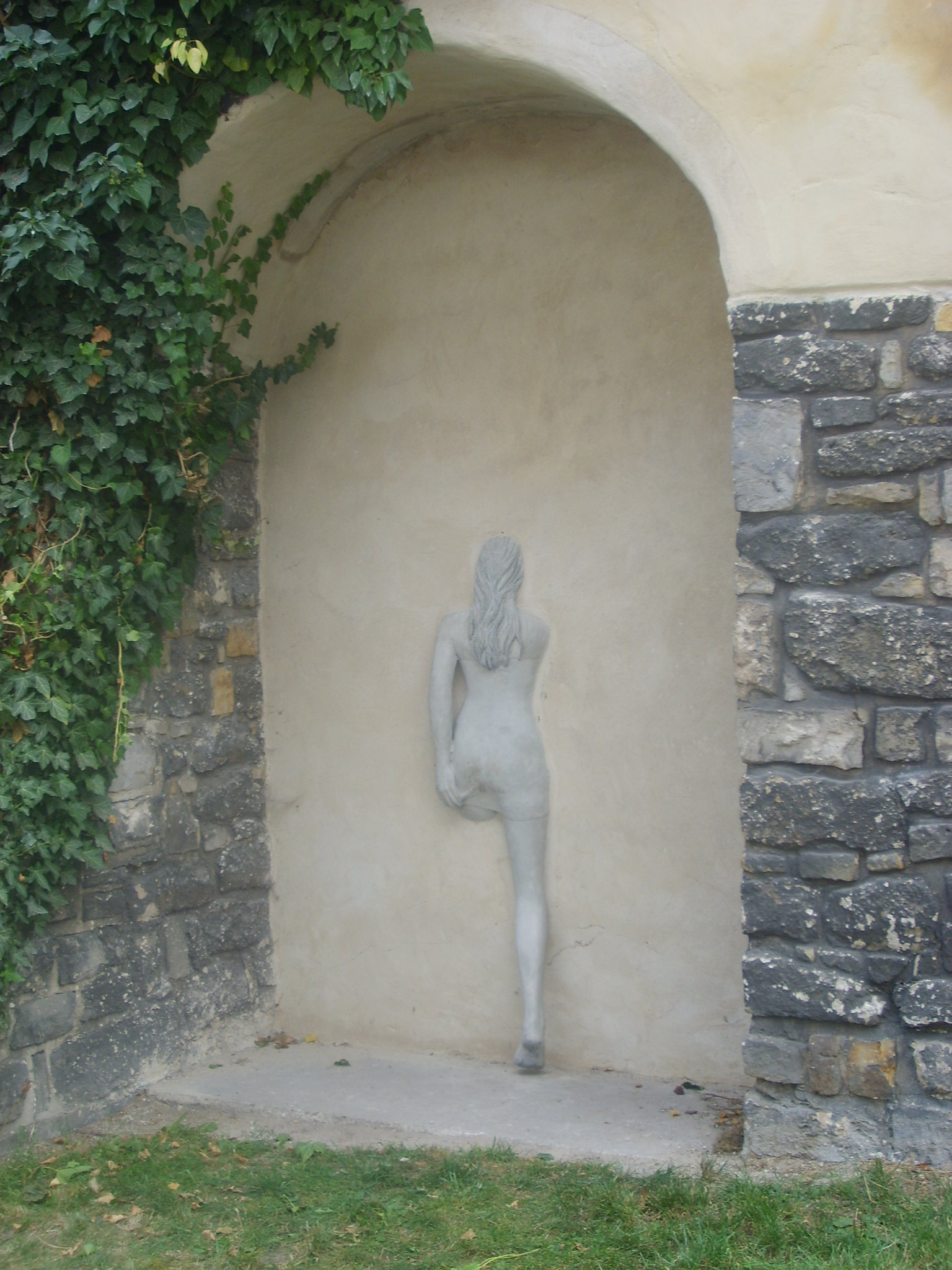
Mistress of the Emperor Rudolf II – concrete, Brandýs nad Labem

Although born in Prague, Czechoslovakia, Zuzana Čížková was raised in Brandýs nad Labem. During her childhood, she was inspired by her grandfather who was an art restorer.

She studied at High School of Sculptures and Stone-cutting in Hořice. Later she continued her studies at the Academy of Arts, Architecture and Design in Prague, department of Fine Arts in the Sculpture Atelier led by Professor Kurt Gebauer. From 2010, she lives and works in Dobřichovice.

During and shortly after her high school studies Zuzana Čížková specialized in traditional technologies and materials (stone and gypsum). Later on, she started to experiment with materials she had already employed earlier in her education. She was discovering of new and non-traditional concrete (cement-mortar mixture) which she achieved in cooperation with the Research Institute of cement – mortar in Prague-Radotín.

She caught the attention of the audience, not only in Czech Republic, but also in France. In Paris, she twice took part in the Salon des Artistes Independants (2005 and 2007) in 2005 as a representative of young Czech artistes. Later she made exhibition with a French painter Valexia. Zuzana Čížková also participated at two internships in Basel in Switzerland and Carrar Quarry in Italy. In the year 2009 she received the Winton Train Award – "Inspiration by Goodness Prague – London" for the work inspired by sign language.

She has created dozens of monumental sculptures for public areas in the Czech Republic (for example in Čížkov, Landek Park in Ostrava, Brandýs nad Labem, Poděbrady, Prague-Prosek and Prague-Smíchov.)

Zuzana Čížková paintings and sculptural works has been intertwined with themes of communication and human being in harmony with nature and spiritual faith. She also created works based on the motifs of sign language. Many objects and especially paintings were created on these themes. For example, the cycles of works We Are Not Robots, Electrofaith, Romantic Landscape of the 21st Century and Horizons of Events.

In recent years, the artist has been painting mainly with oil and acrylic on canvases in impasto style layers in very bright colors.

== Permanent installation in public areas (selection) ==
- Ivory of mammoth, in Landek Park in Ostrava, stone (2006)
- Mistress of Emperor Rudolf II in Brandýs nad Labem, concrete (2006)
- Sign language sculpture "Life is beautiful, be happy and love each other" – in Prague-Smíchov, concrete (2011)
- Monument to Saint Agnes of Bohemia in Poděbrady, artificial sandstone (2012)
- Monument to the Czech painter Ludvík Kuba in Poděbrady, concrete (2013)
- Madonna's Secret in Prague- Prosek, marble, sandstone, granite and concrete (2024)
- Statue of Master Cooper Jaroslav Tománek in Praskačka- near Hradec Králové (2026)

== Exhibitions (selection) ==
- 25 years from first solo exhibition, Dobřichovice Castle, 2024
- Kousek cesty (A little way) (2017), Galery 9, Vysočany Town Hall, Sokolovská street, Prague 9
- Trip in Brandýs (2016), club Kočár, Brandýs castle carriage house, Brandýs nad Labem
- Paintings Zuzana Čížková (2017), Hellichova ulice, kostel sv. Vavřince, Prague
- Paintings Zuzana Čížková (2016), Hellichova ulice, kostel sv. Vavřince, Prague
- Romantic landscape (2015), Creative Gate, Jindřišská pasáž, Prague
- C‘est moi - moje cesty, My Ways, Gallery Klatovy Klenová, St. Lawrence, Klatovy, 2014
- La Galerie Thuillier expose - Zuzana Cizkova, Galerie Thuillier, rue de Thorigny, Paris, France
- Up to the ears in the concrete, 2010 Hradec Králové ( in international concrete seminar )
- Siskin at nightingale, 2010 Rašínovo nábřeží, Prague, CZ
- Concrete, 2007 Contemporary project, Museum in Čelákovice, CZ
- Mémoire du Futur - Memory of future, 2007 NKP Vyšehrad, Prague, CZ
- Plastic illusion, 2004 Regional Museum for Prague - East in Brandýs nad Labem,
- Sculpture in trip, 2004, Mariánské Lázně
- Unconventionally classic, 2002 Museum in Čelákovice, CZ

Selected collective exhibitions

- ARTEXPO NY, Galeria Azur, New York City, USA, 2026
- Session S-05, Galeria Azur, Berlin, Germany, 2025
- Středočeské Trienále, Rabas Gallery Rakovník, 2024
- Beroun, Municipal Gallery Beroun, Member exhibition of the Association of Central Bohemian Artists), 2022
- ČVUT, Cesta za Duhou (Journey to the Rainbow), Prague - Dejvice, 2022
- Auction House Groma, Important works of contemporary Slovak and Czech art), Žilina, Slovakia, 2021
- Fancies of police lieutenant colonel, Police museum, Ke Karlovu 1, Prague 2 (with Rudolf Čížek) 2014
- Les Toiles de l'été, Galerie Thuillier, Paris, France, 2013
- Středočeské Trienále, Rabas Gallery Rakovník, 2012
- Czech Bible through the Centuries – Česká bible v průběhu století, Presidents‘ Gallery-European Commission, Brussels, Belgium, 2009
- Altars of sacrificed time, Gallery in Chapel Jan Nepomucký, Jungmannovo náměstí, Prague 1 - sculptures by Zuzana Čížková, photography by Radim Beznoska, 2004

== Art works in public space ==
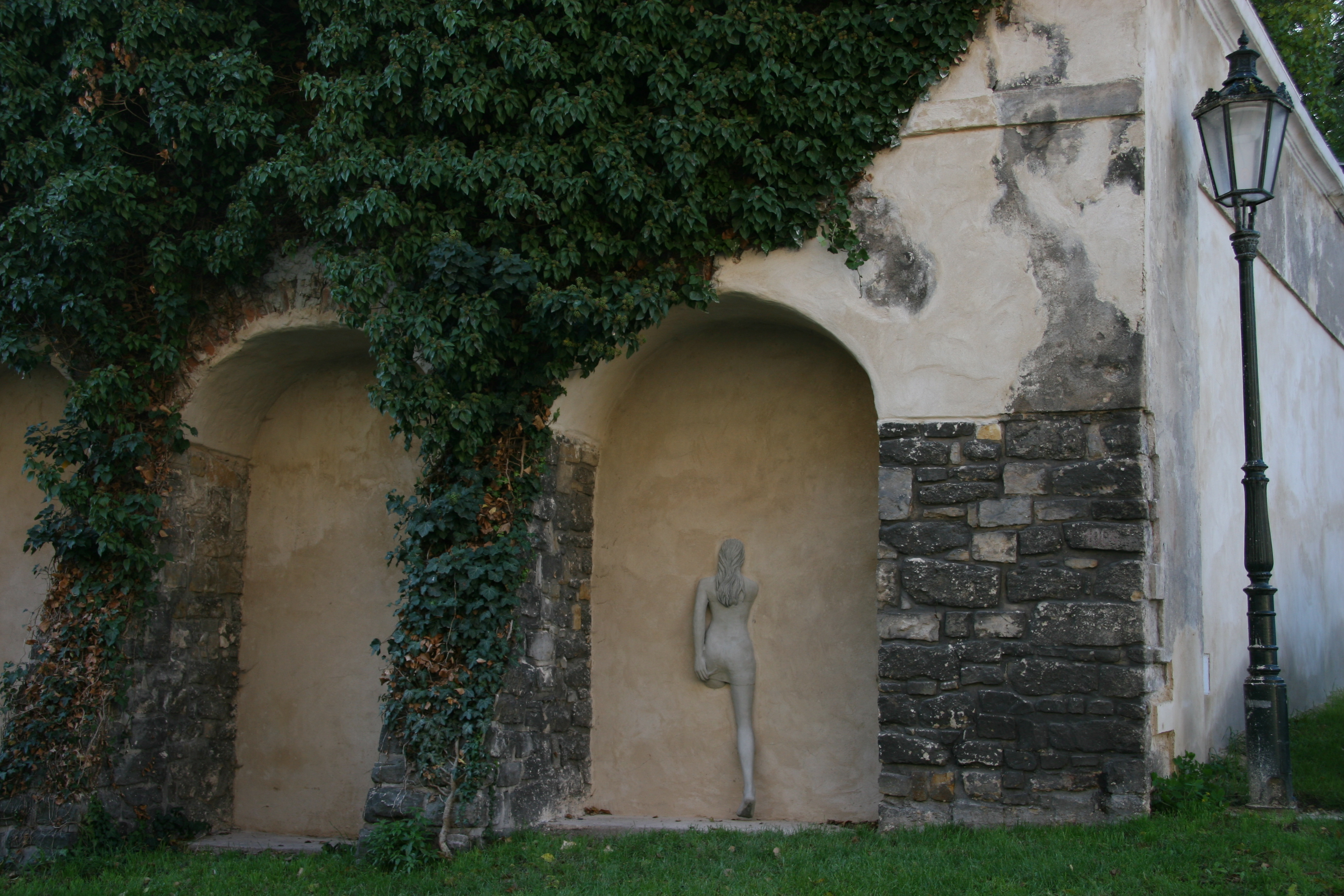
Mistress of the Emperor Rudolf II – concrete, Brandýs nad Labem (2006)

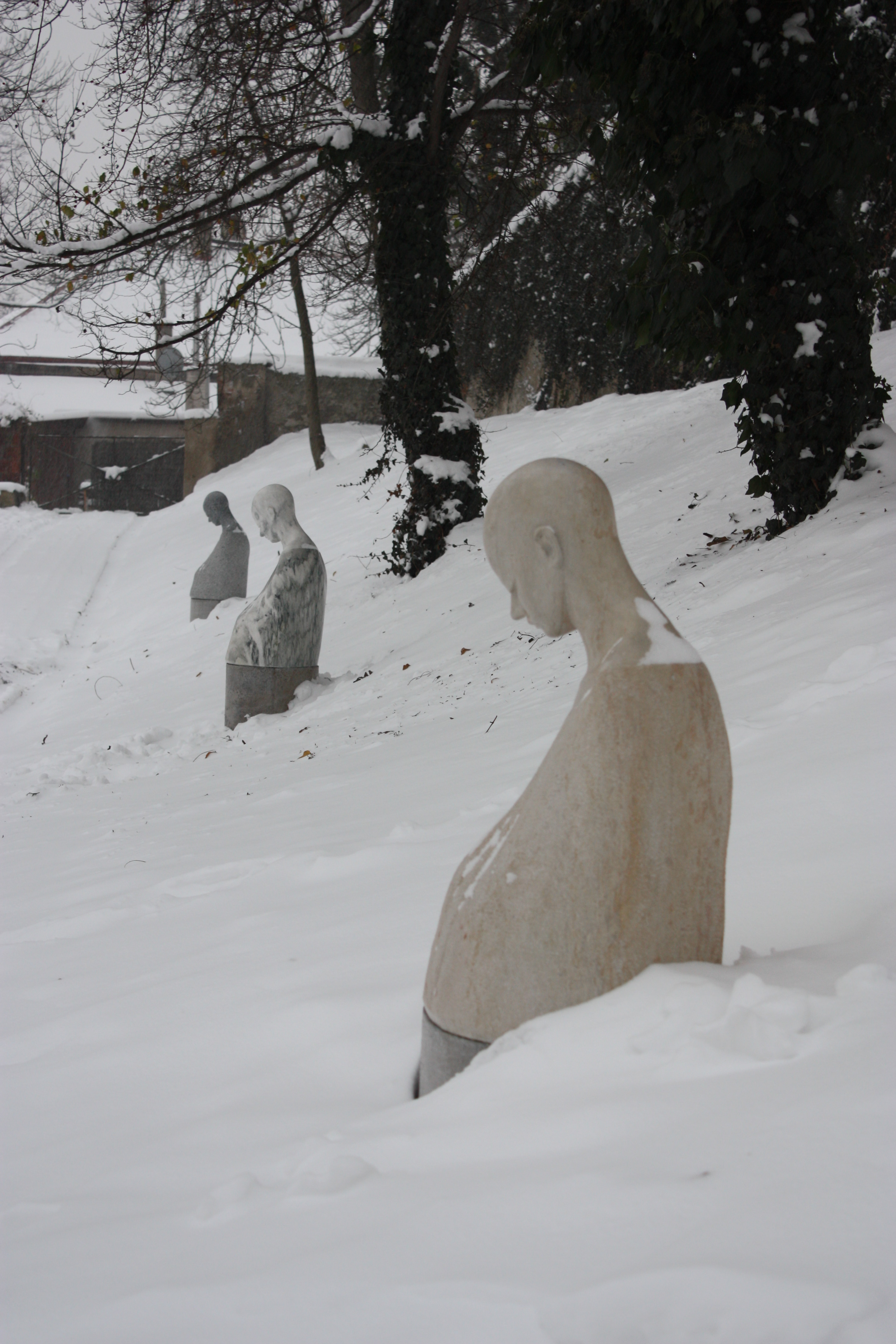
Three Madonnas in Prague-Prosek (2010)

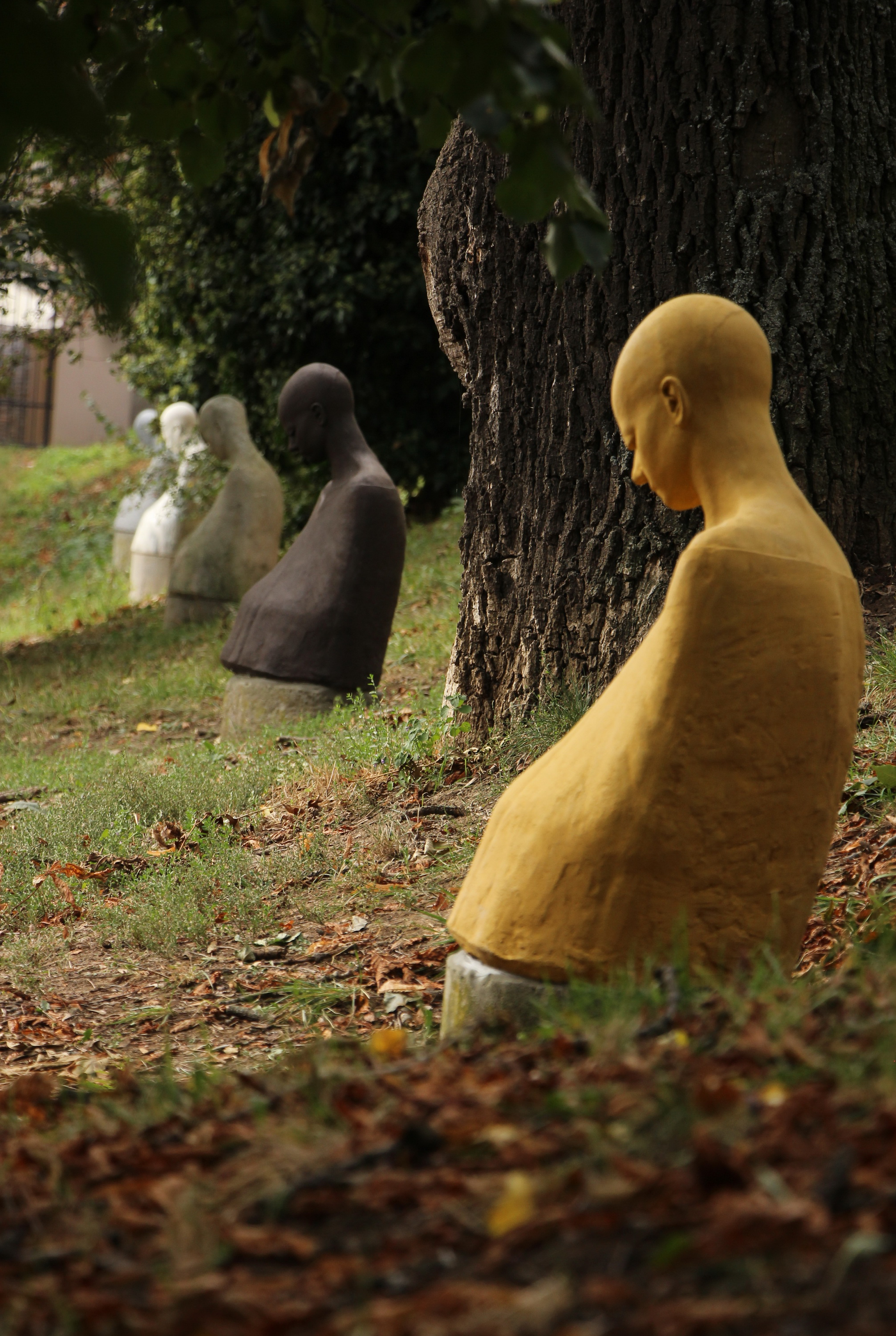
Madonna's secret in Prague-Prosek (2024)

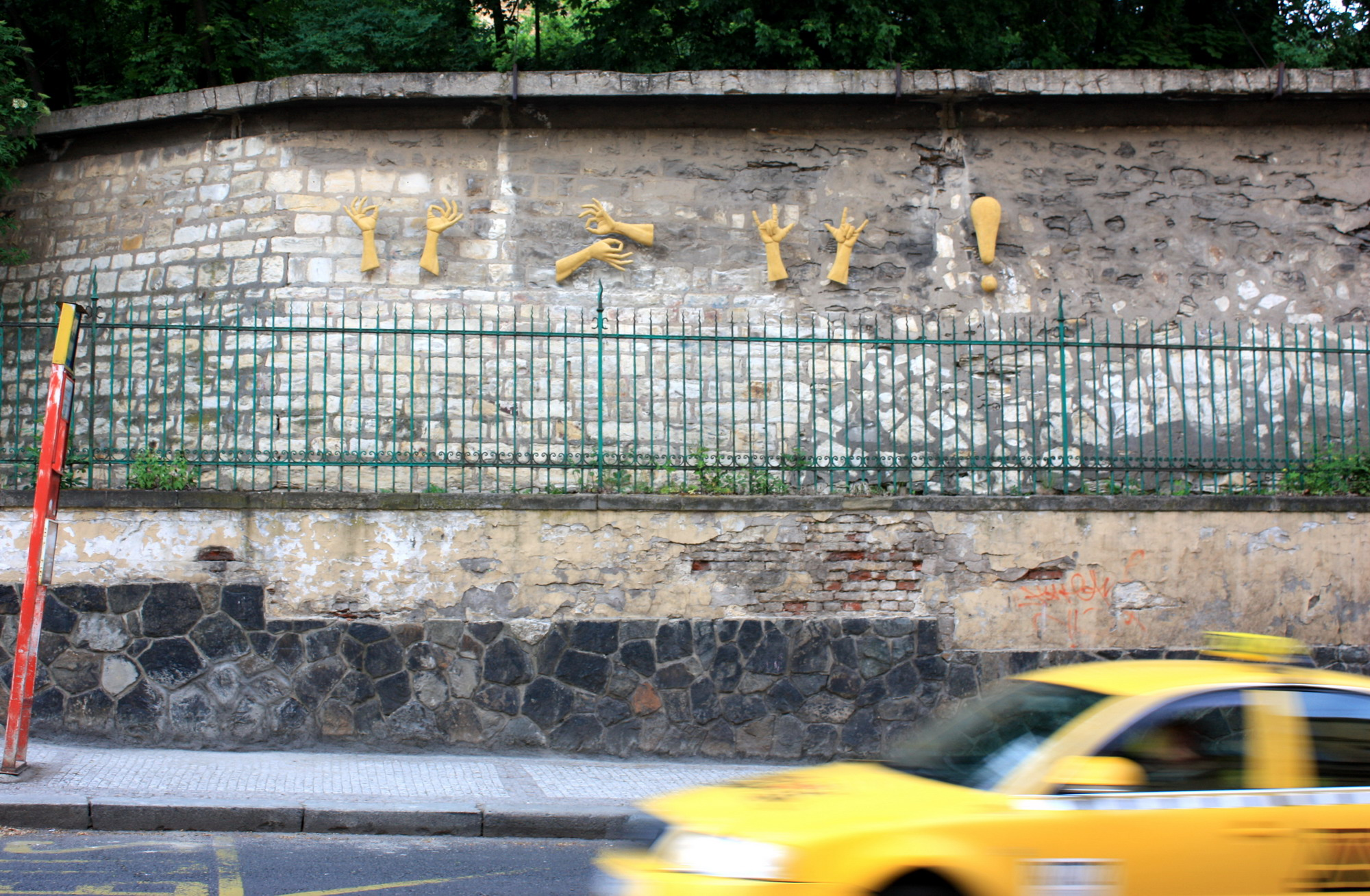
Sign language - concrete, Prague-Smíchov (2011)

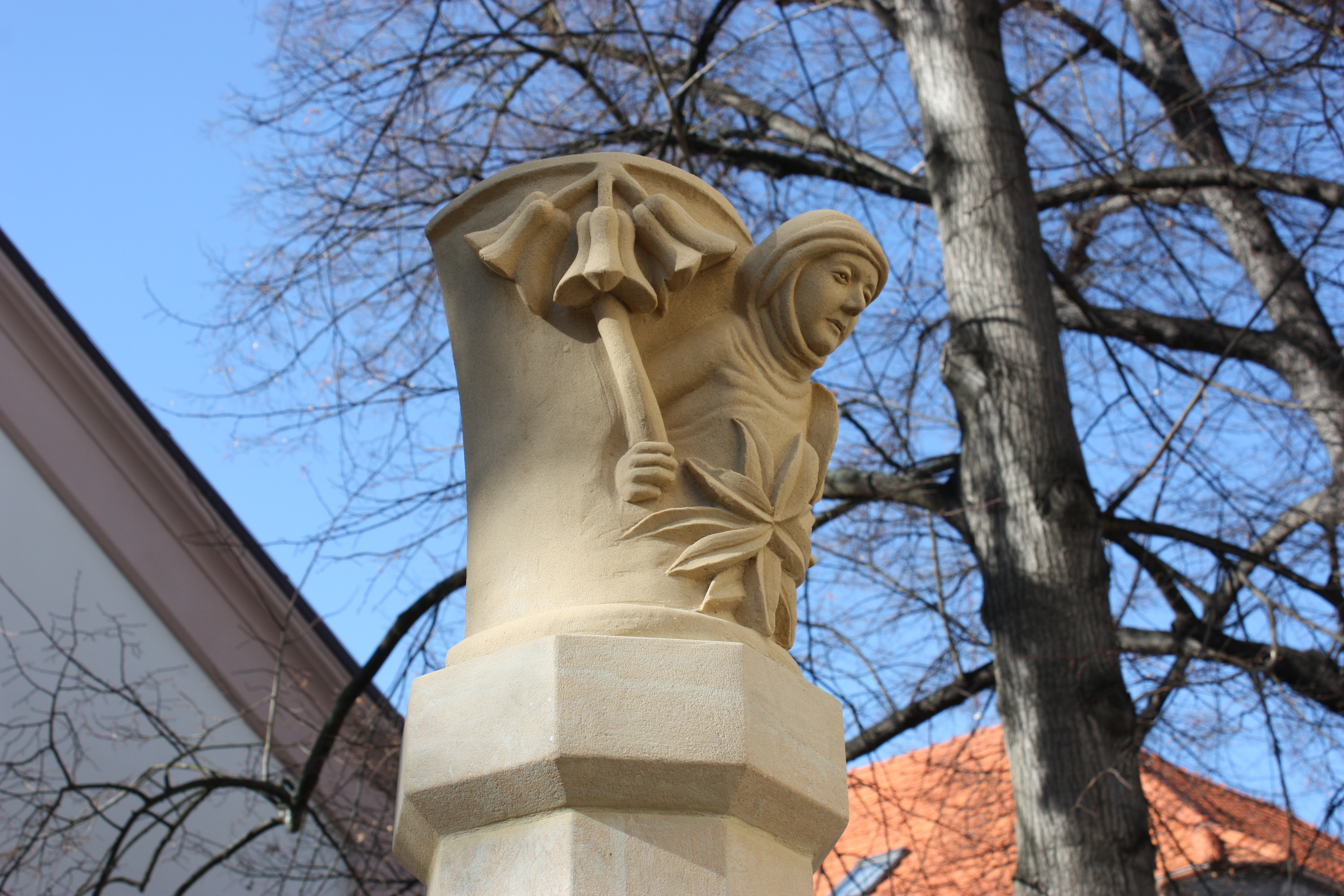
Monument to Saint Agnes of Bohemia in Poděbrady (2012)

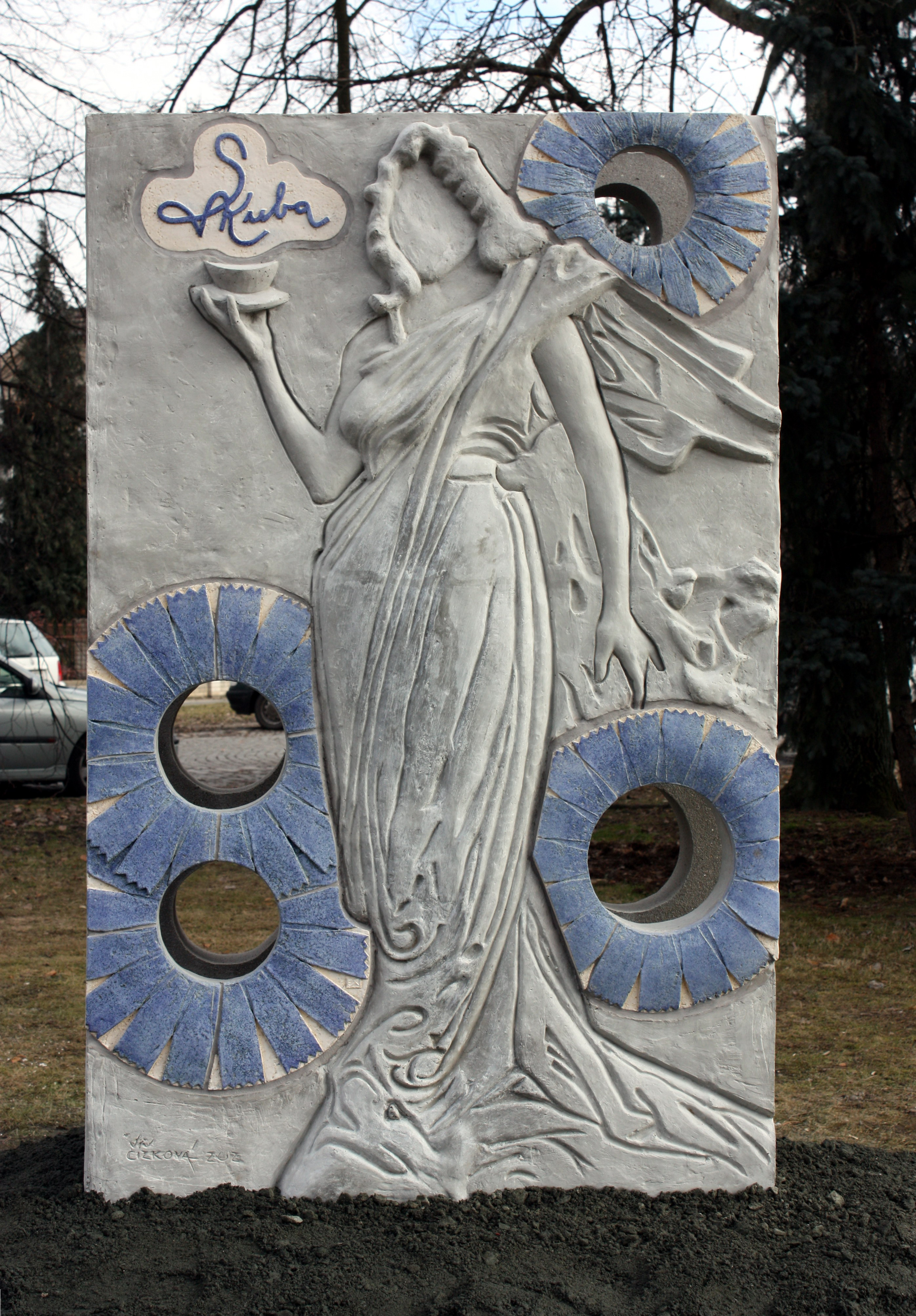
Monument based on motifs by Czech painter Ludvík Kuba in Poděbrady (2013)

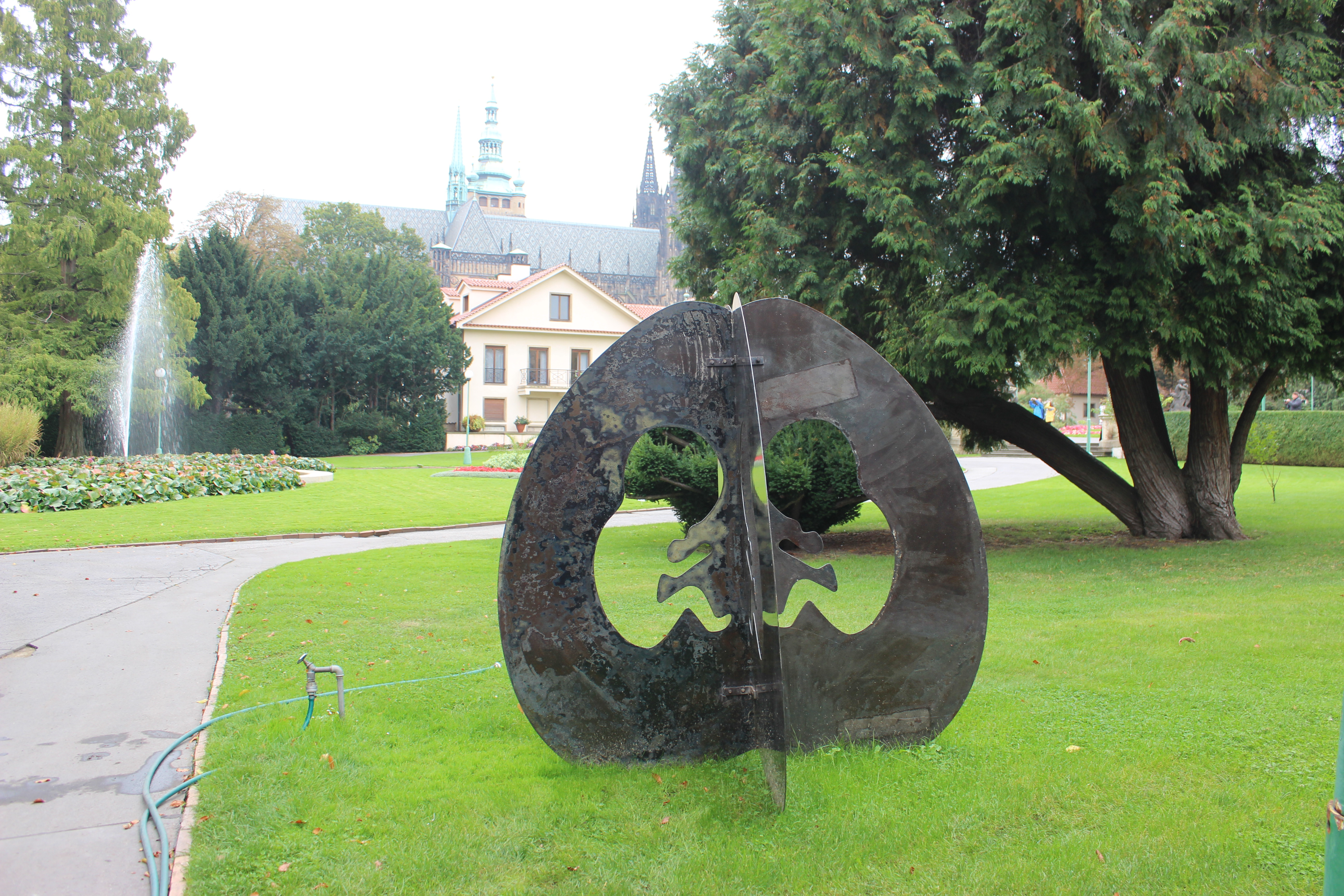
Nativity - sculpture installed at Prague Castle in 2016.

== Paintings ==
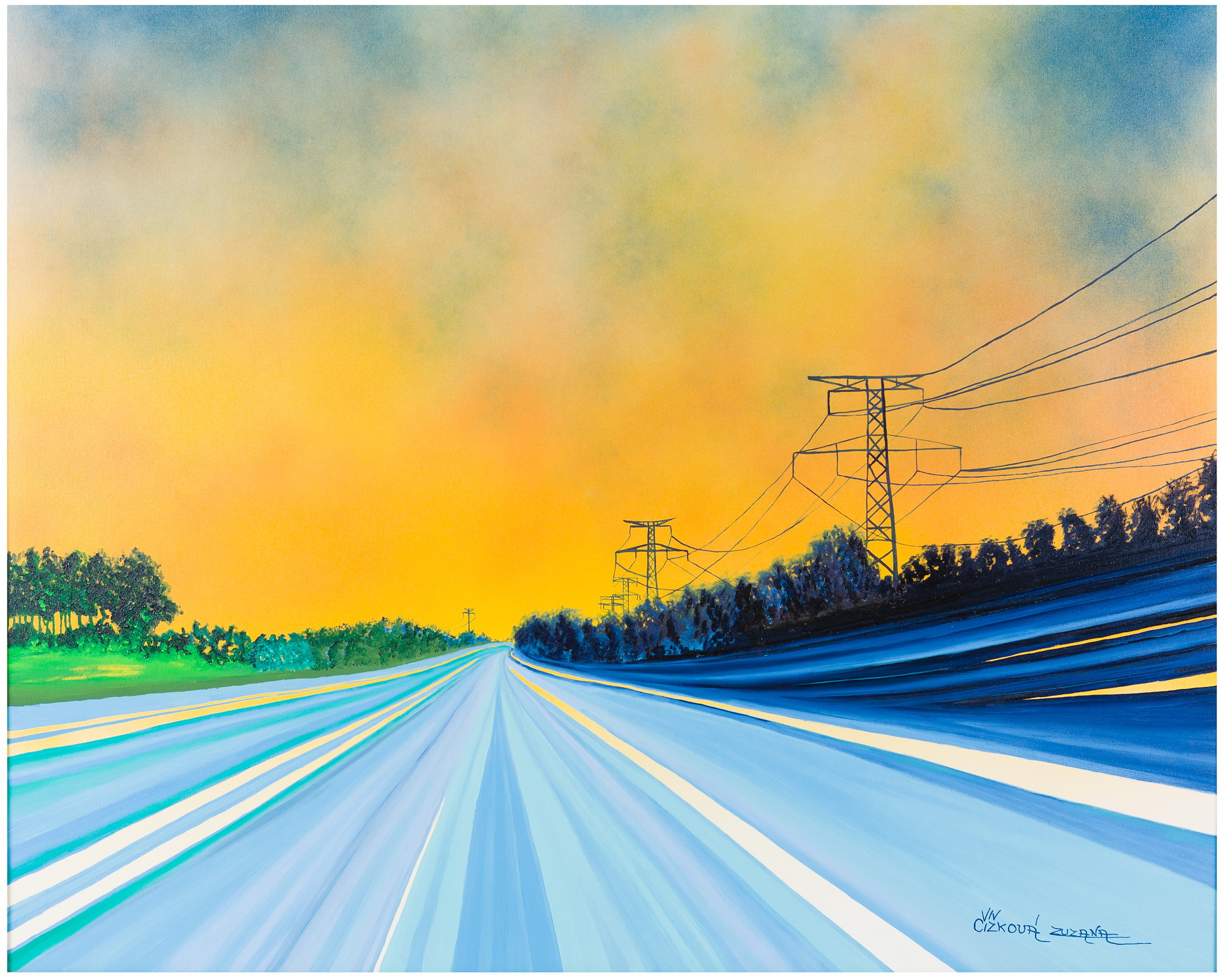
Route To Normandy – oil painting from cycle Romantic Landscape of 21st Century

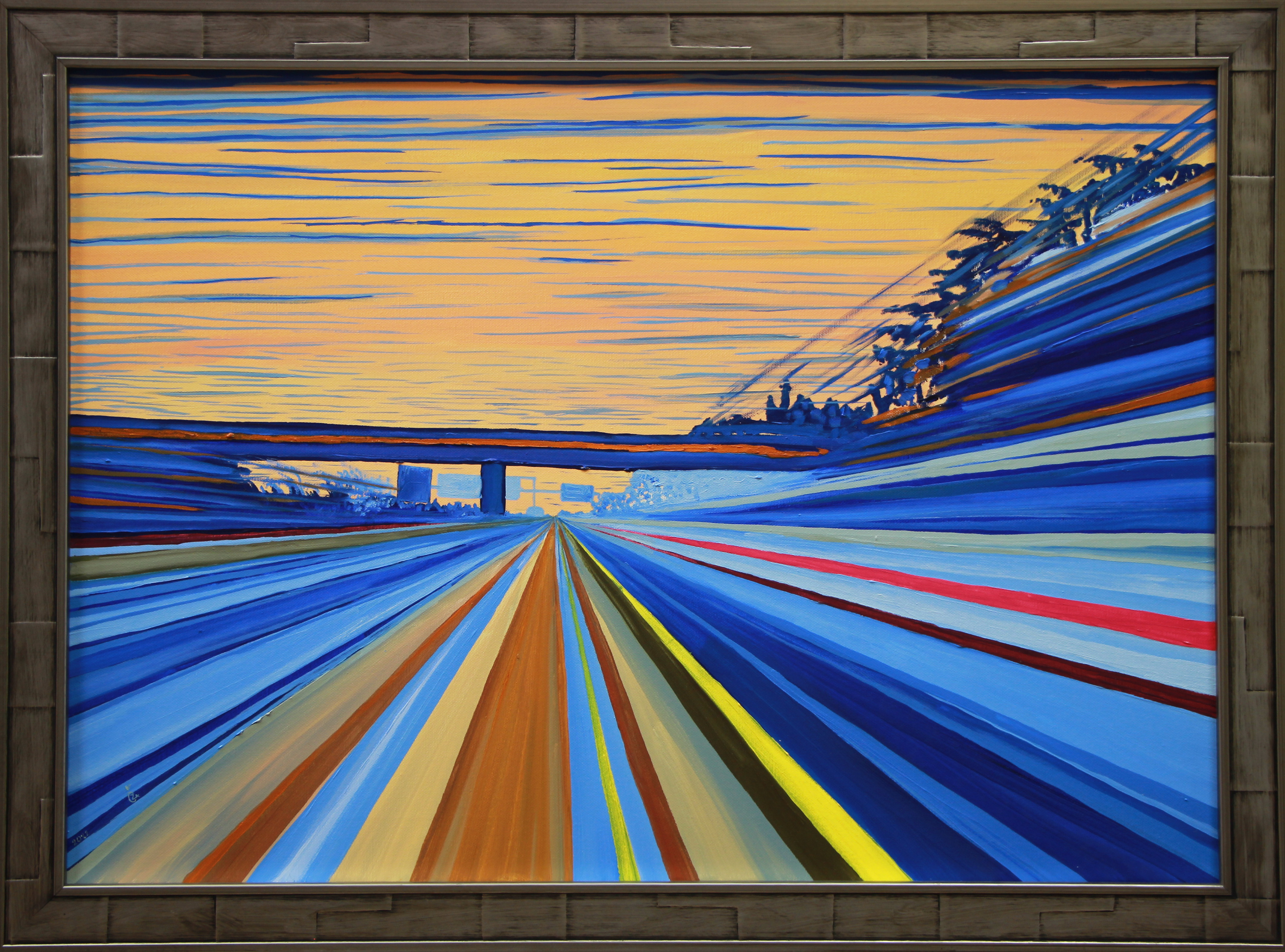
From Dusk Till Dawn - oil painting from cycle Romantic Landscape of 21st Century

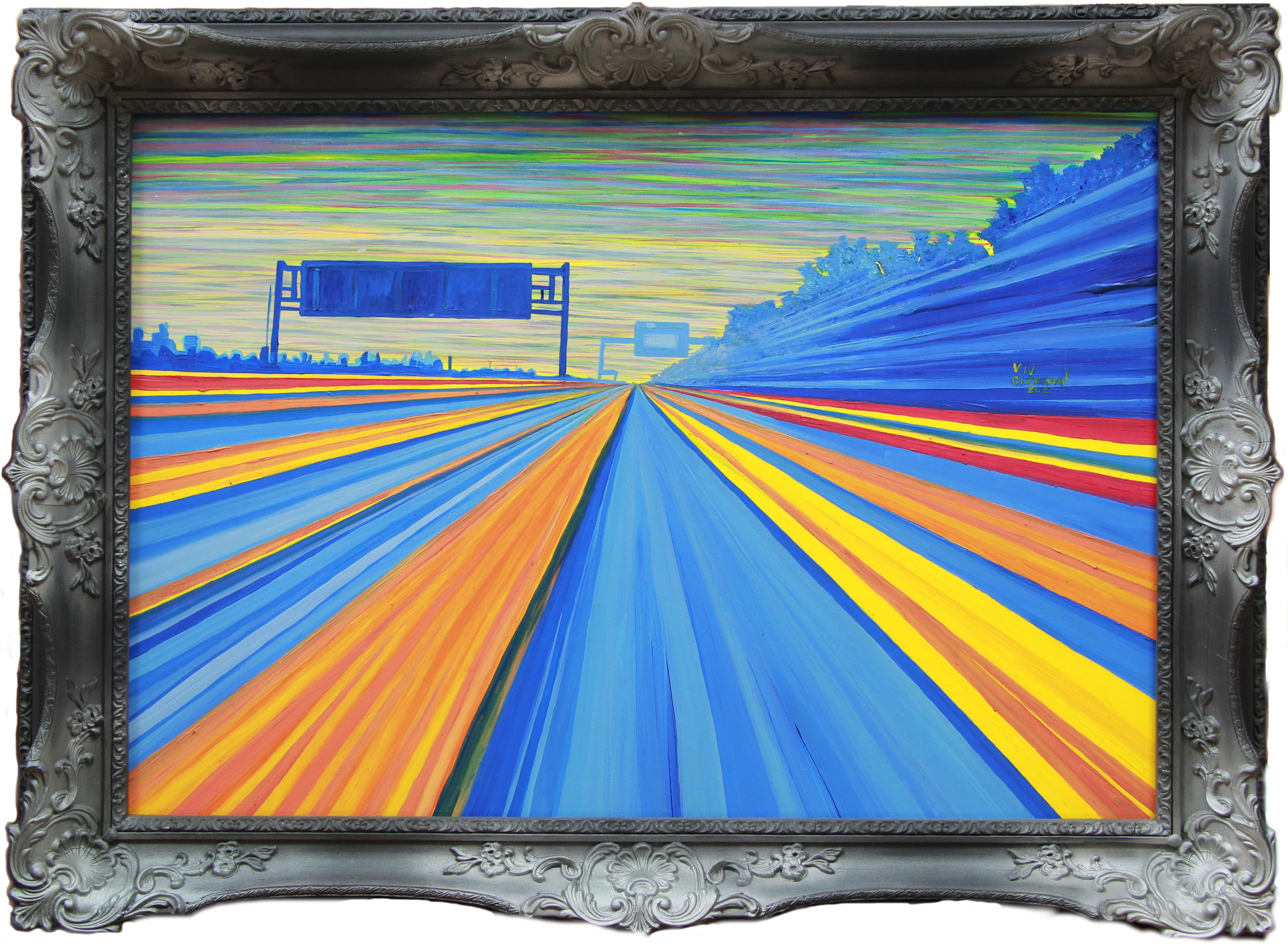
King Of The World - oil painting from cycle Romantic Landscape of 21st Century

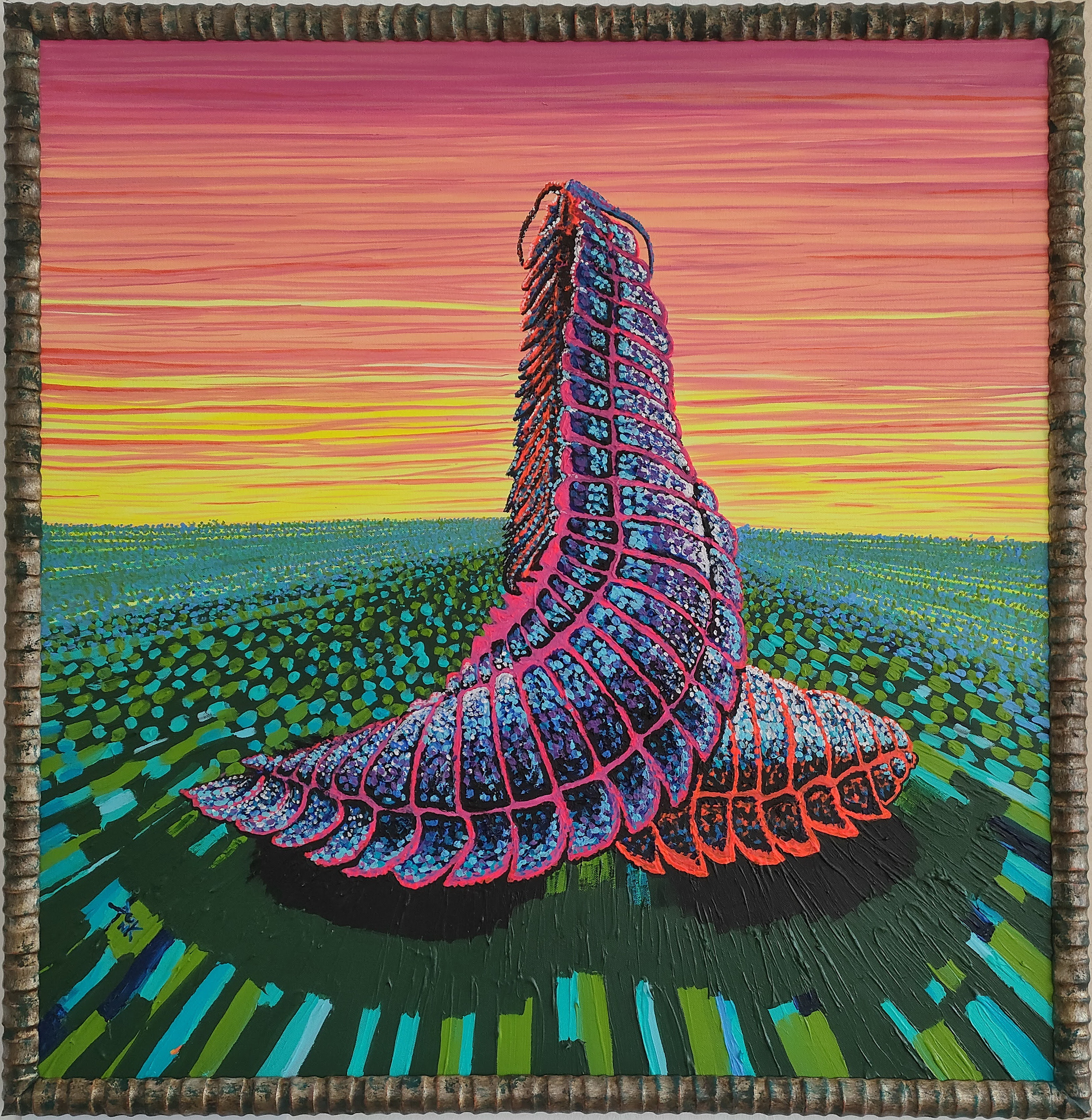
Where Is The Tree - from cycle Horizon of events

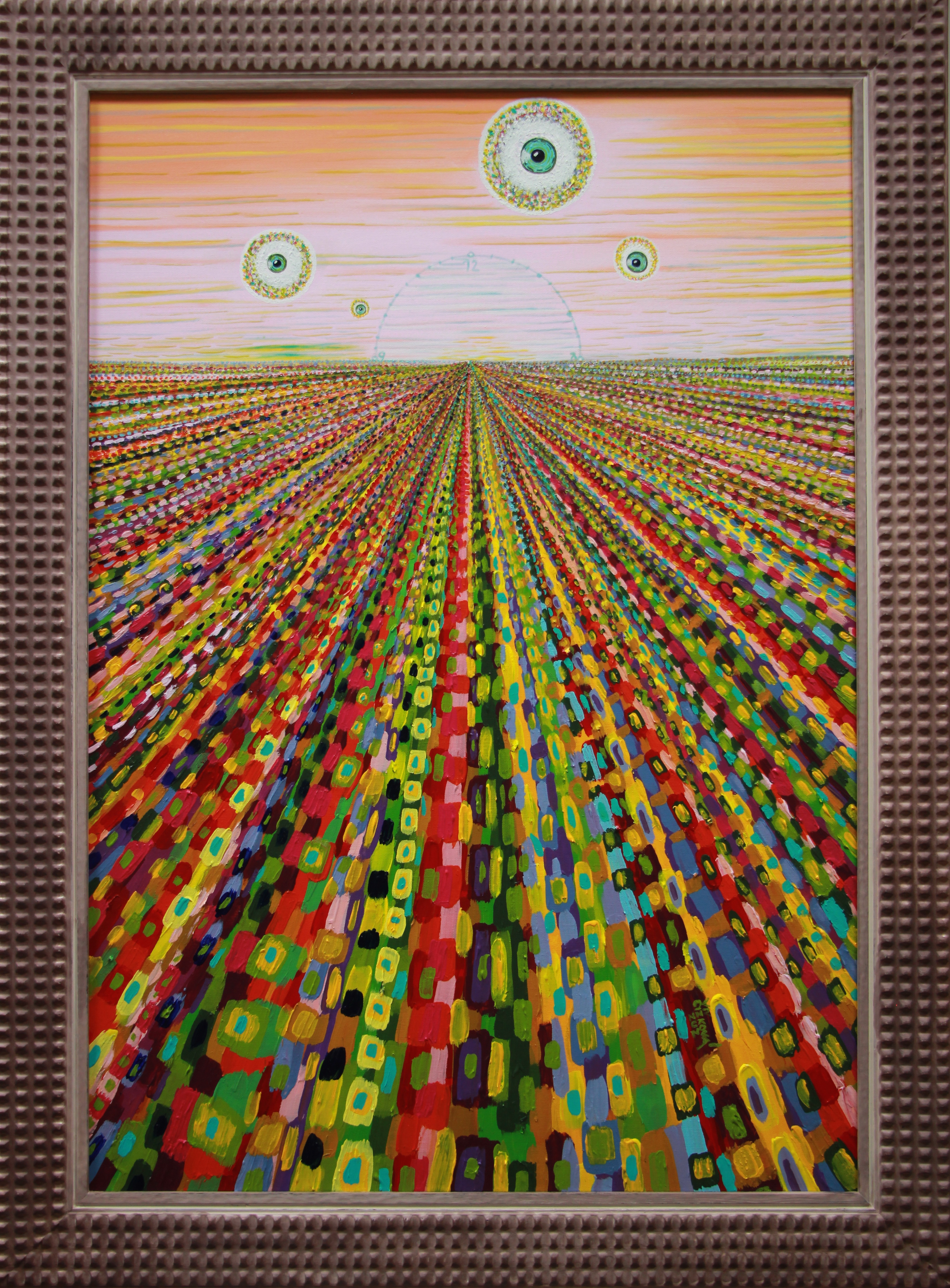
Horizon Of Events - from cycle Horizon of events

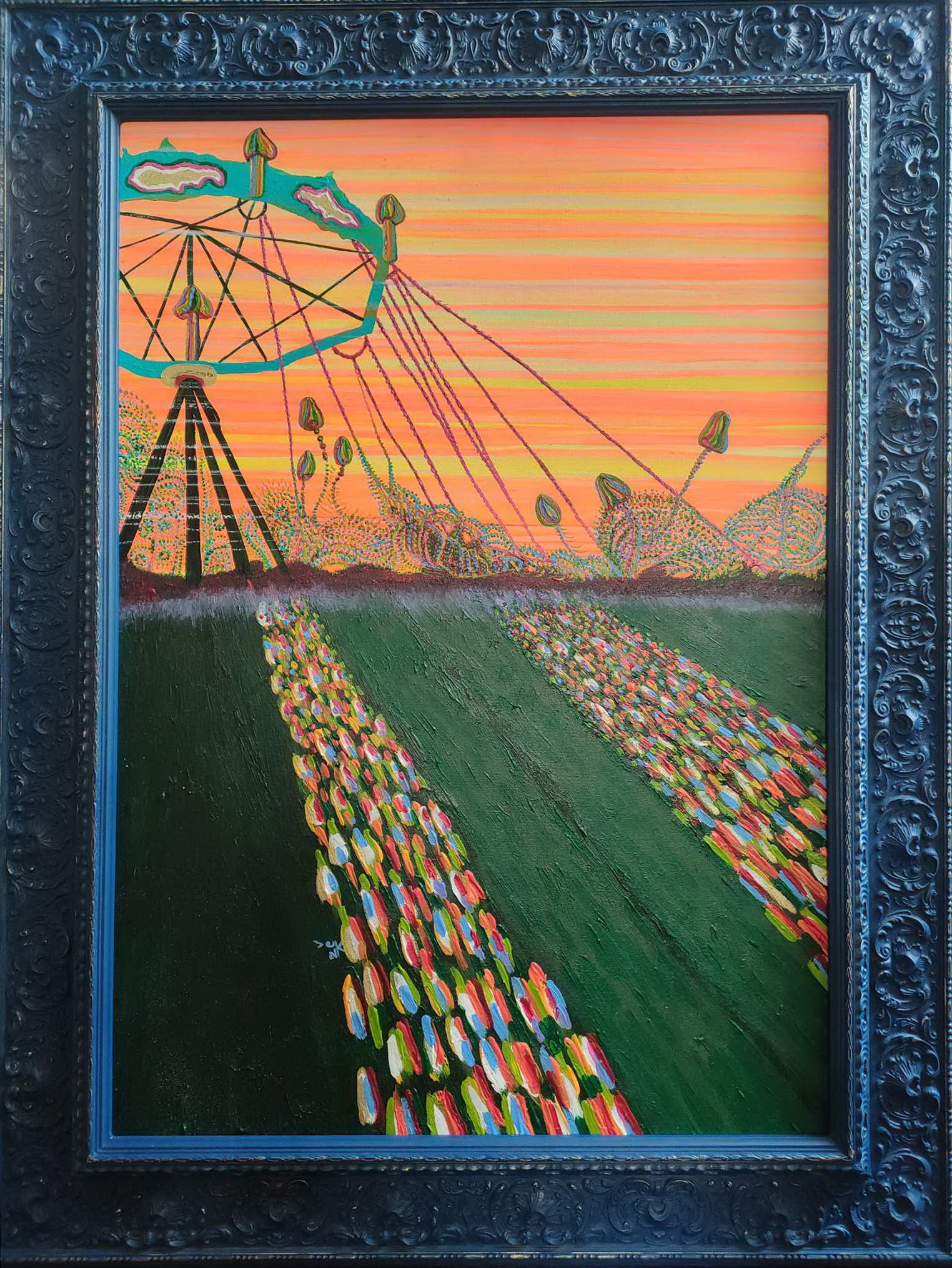
As Time Is Gone - oil paintings from cycle Horizon of events

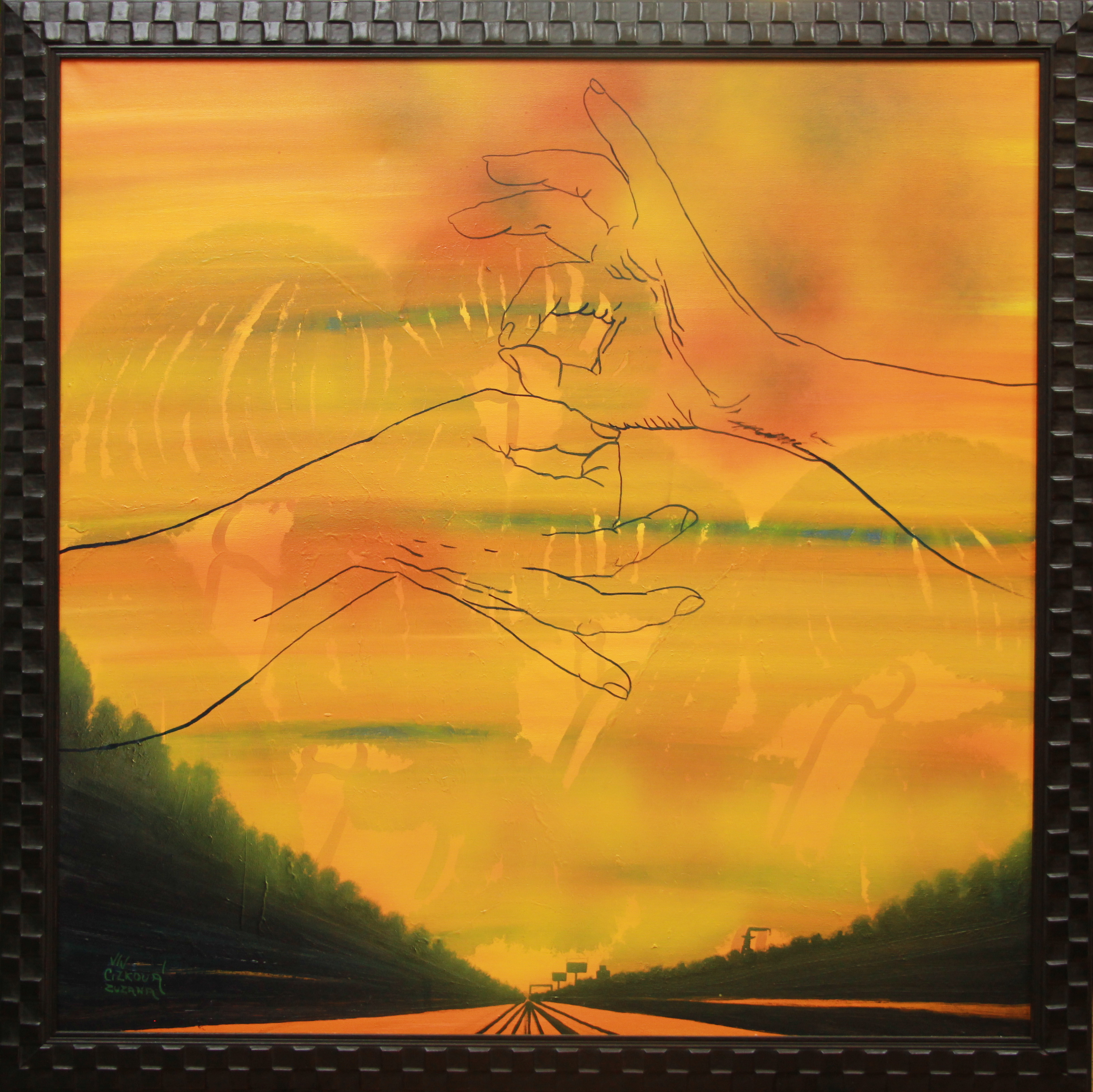
Paths Of Happiness - oil painting from cycle Romantic Landscape of 21st Century

== Sculptures ==
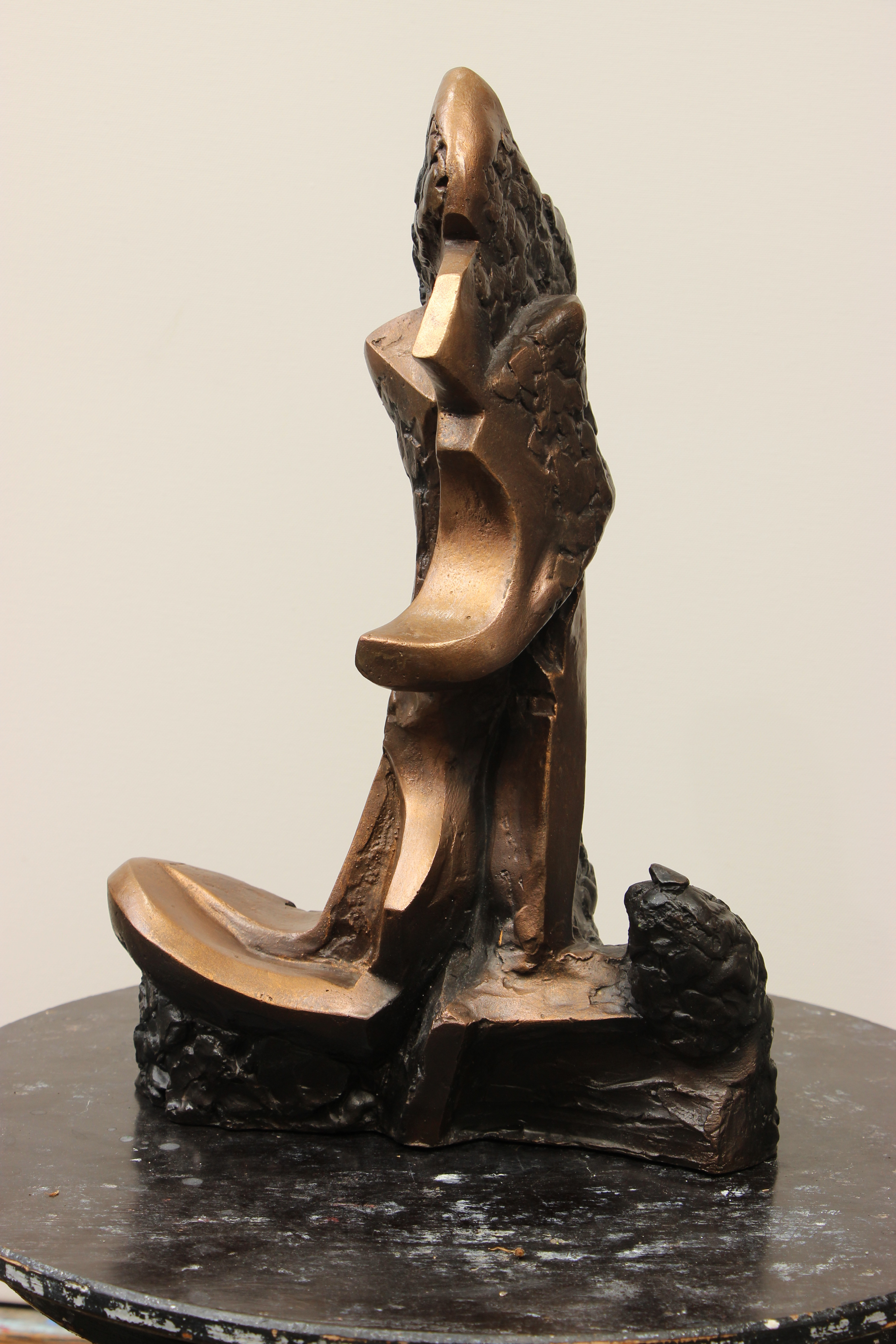
Cubist Singing – bronze

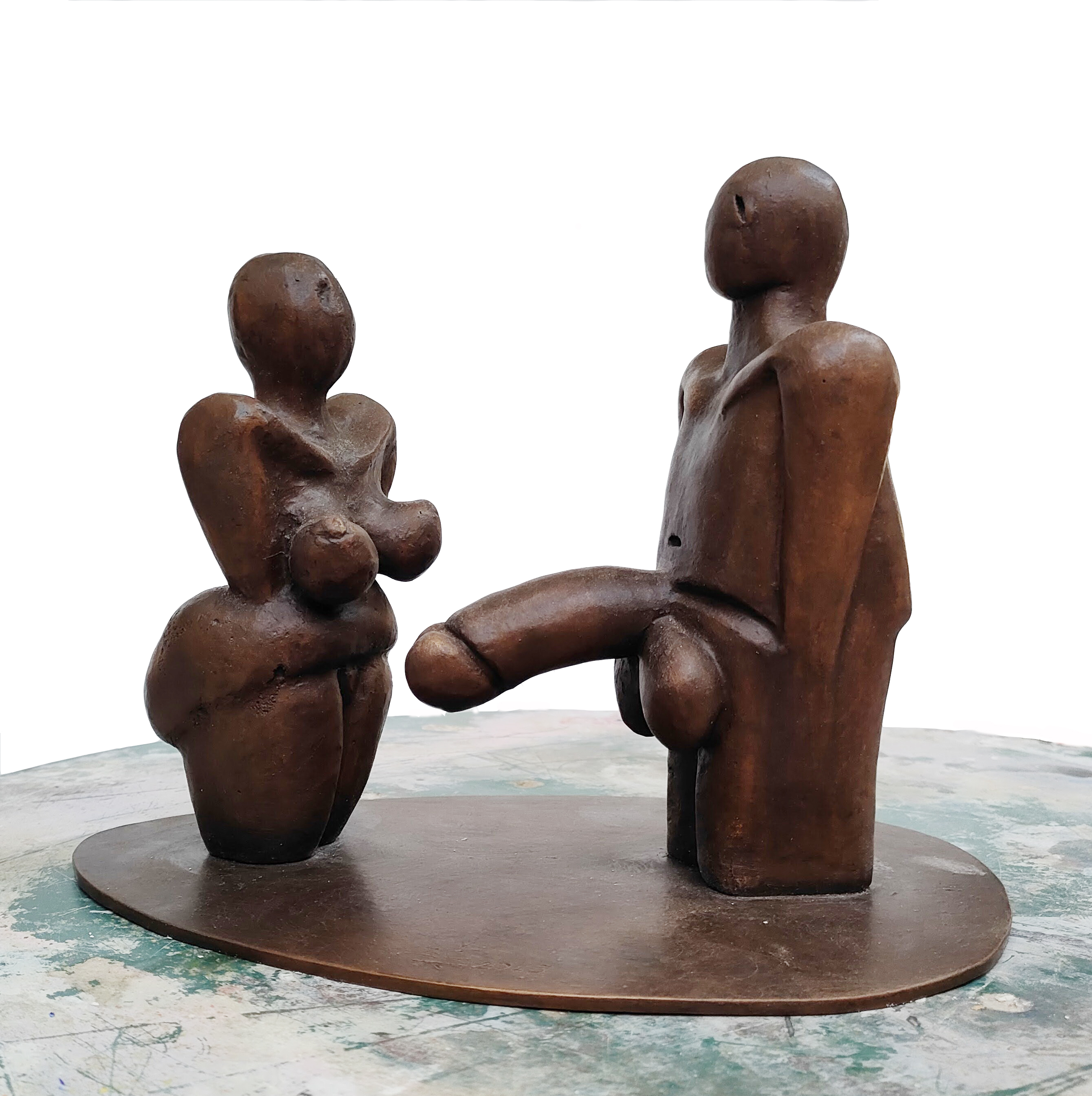
Non-verbal Communication – bronze

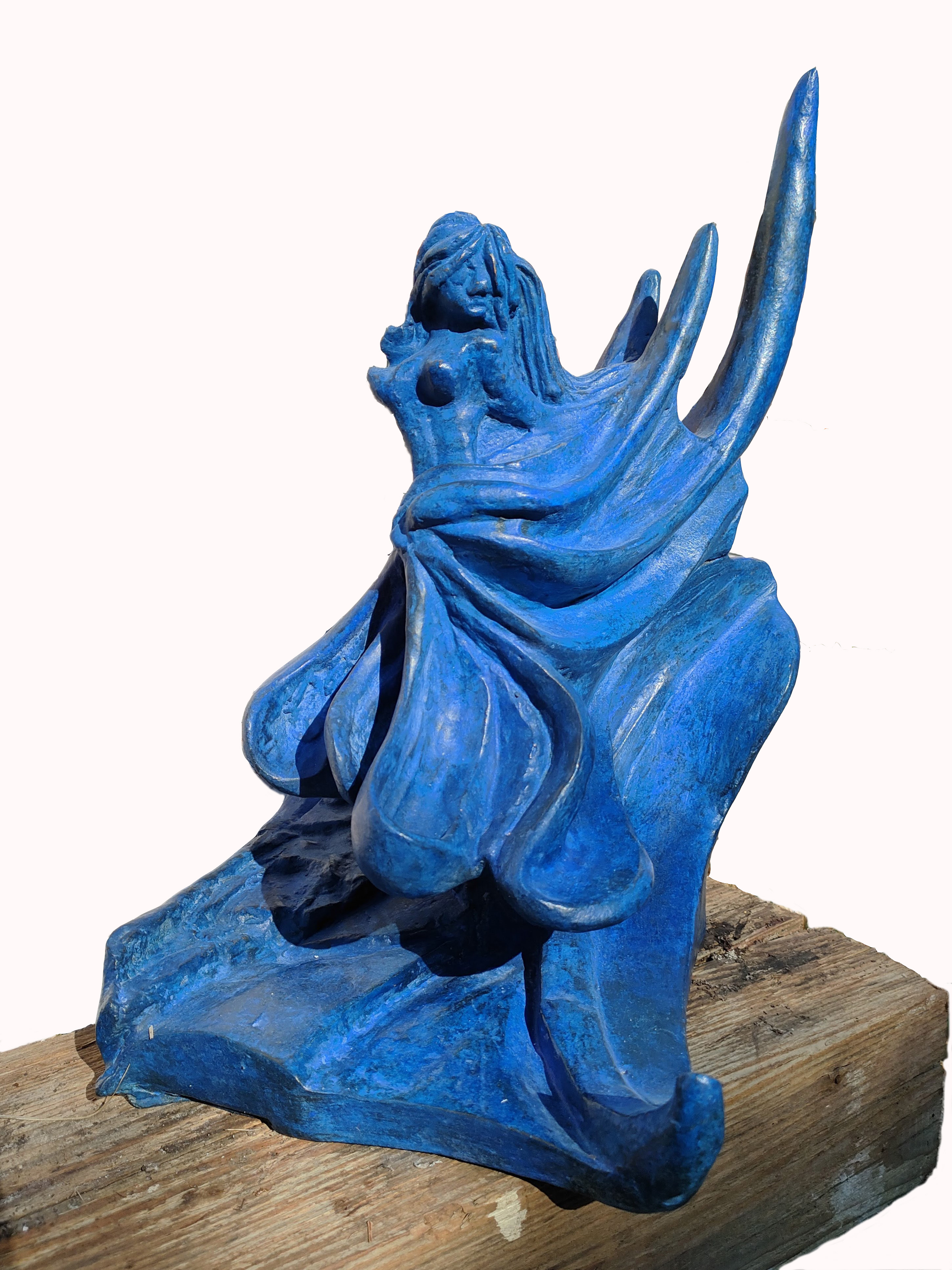
On A Wawe of Desire – patinated bronze

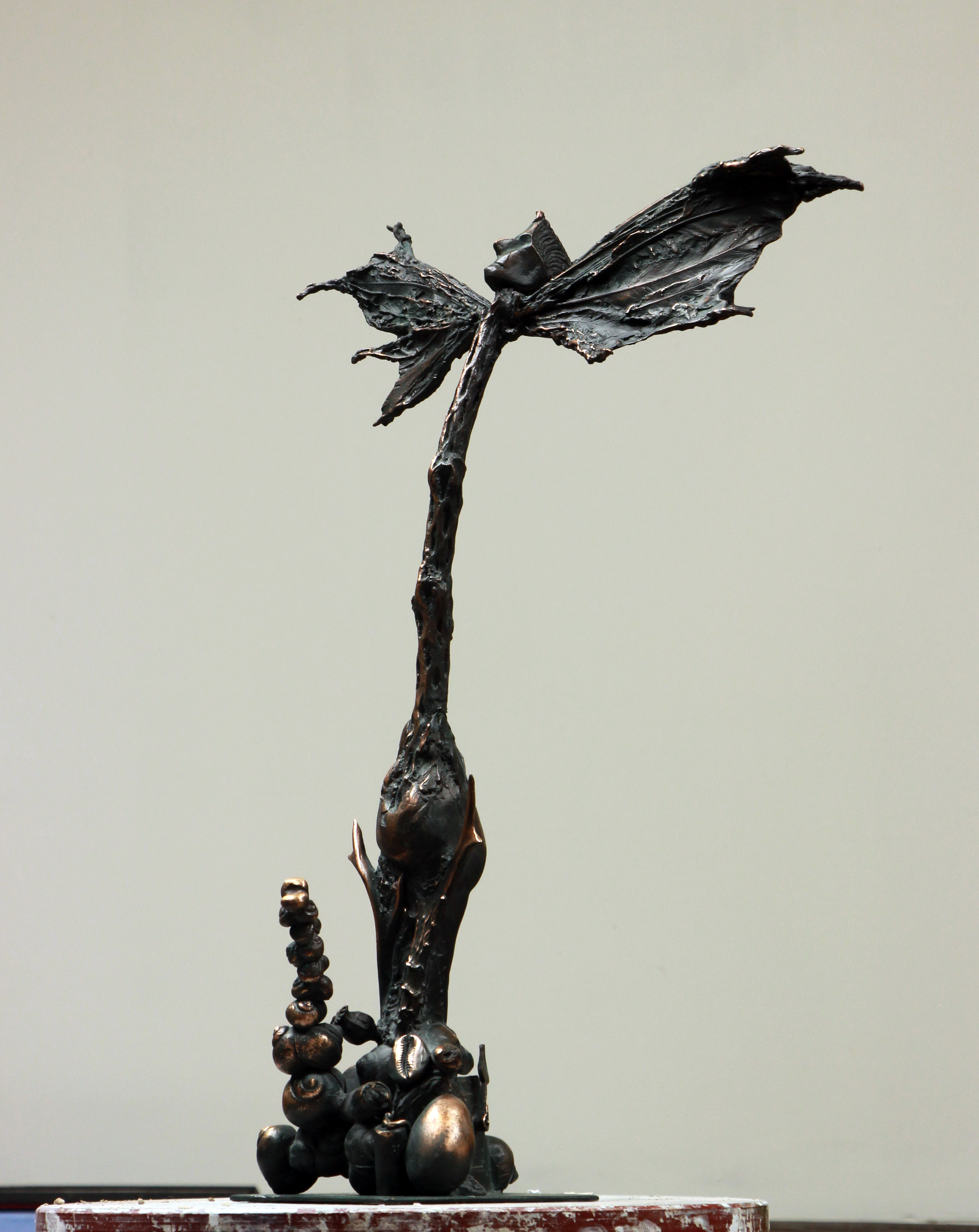
Fun with Dali – bronze

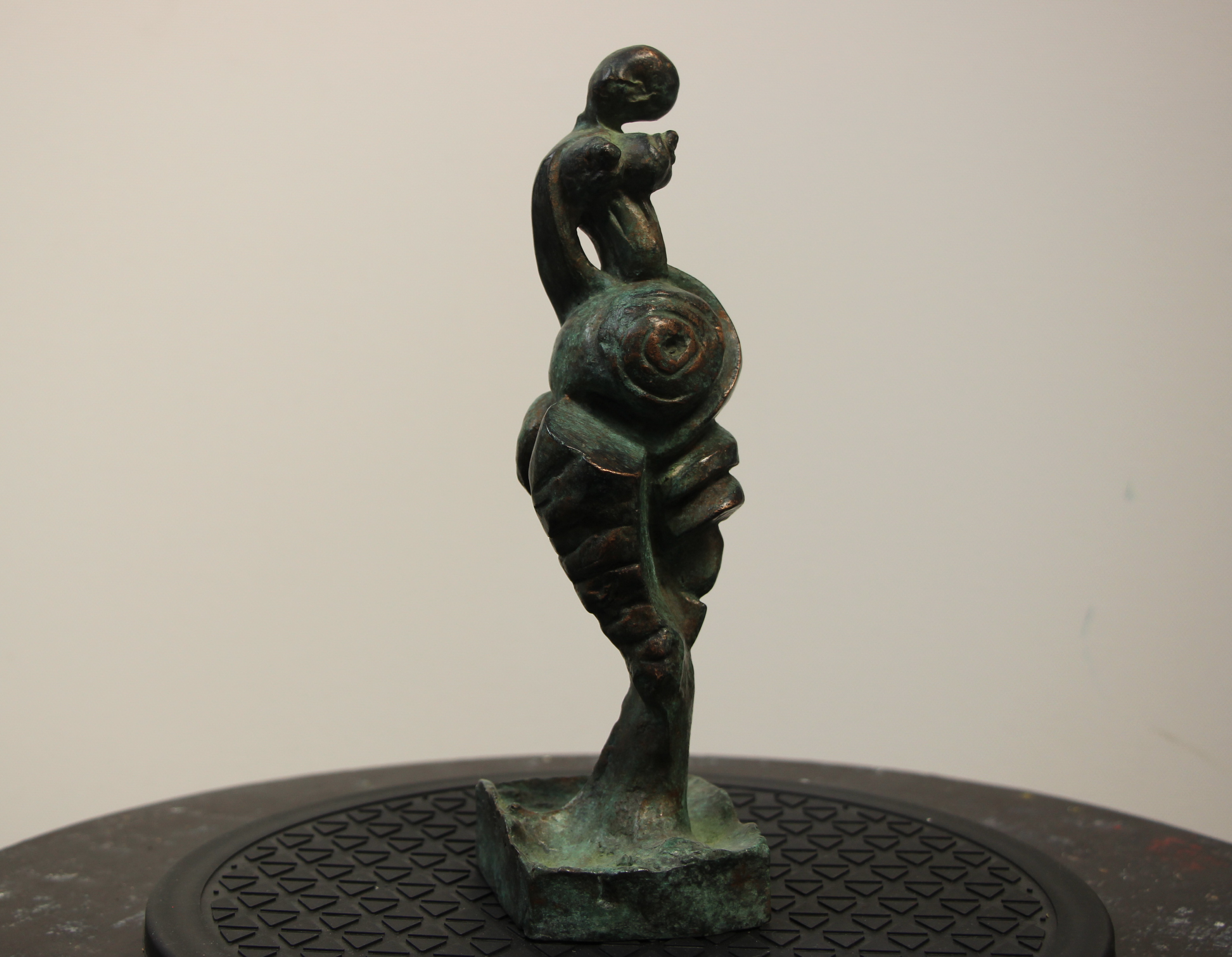
Violin Lady – bronze

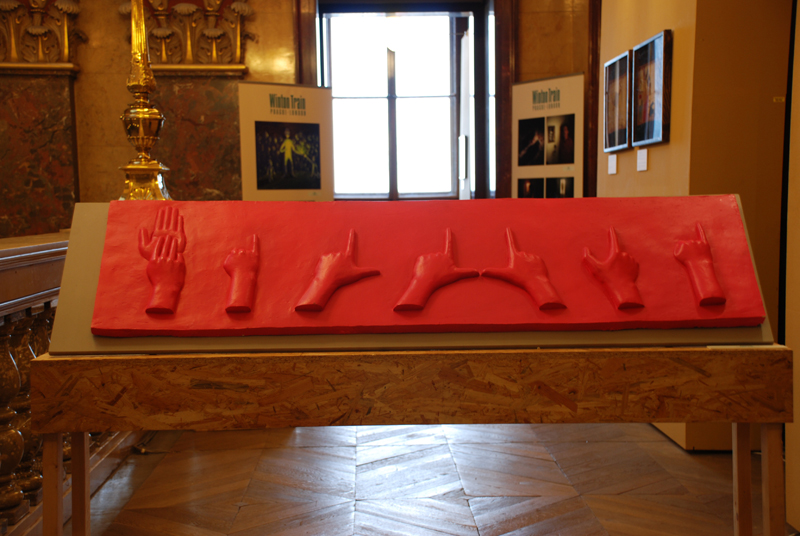
Relief - I Love

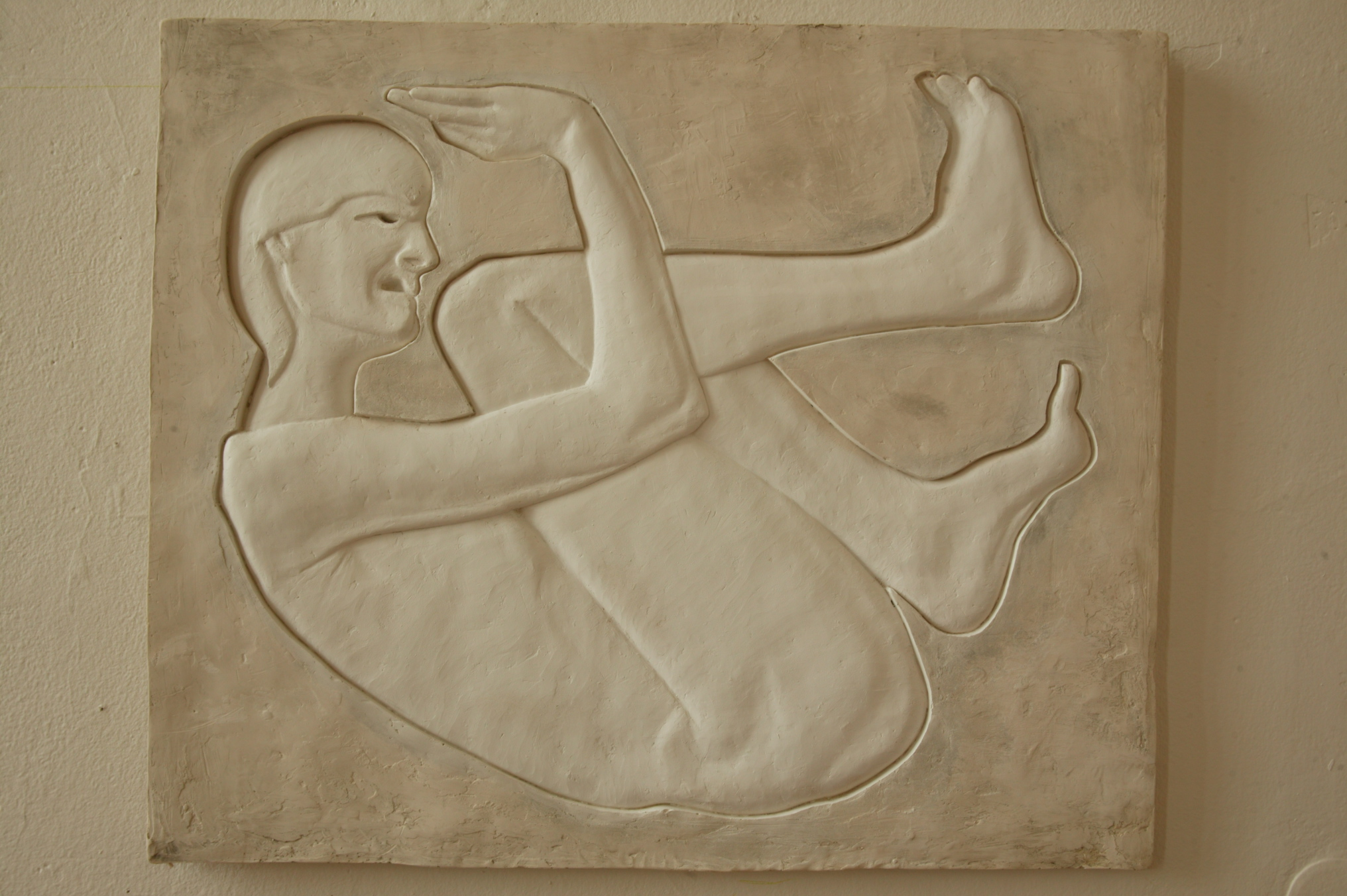
Power of Not Being in a Box -

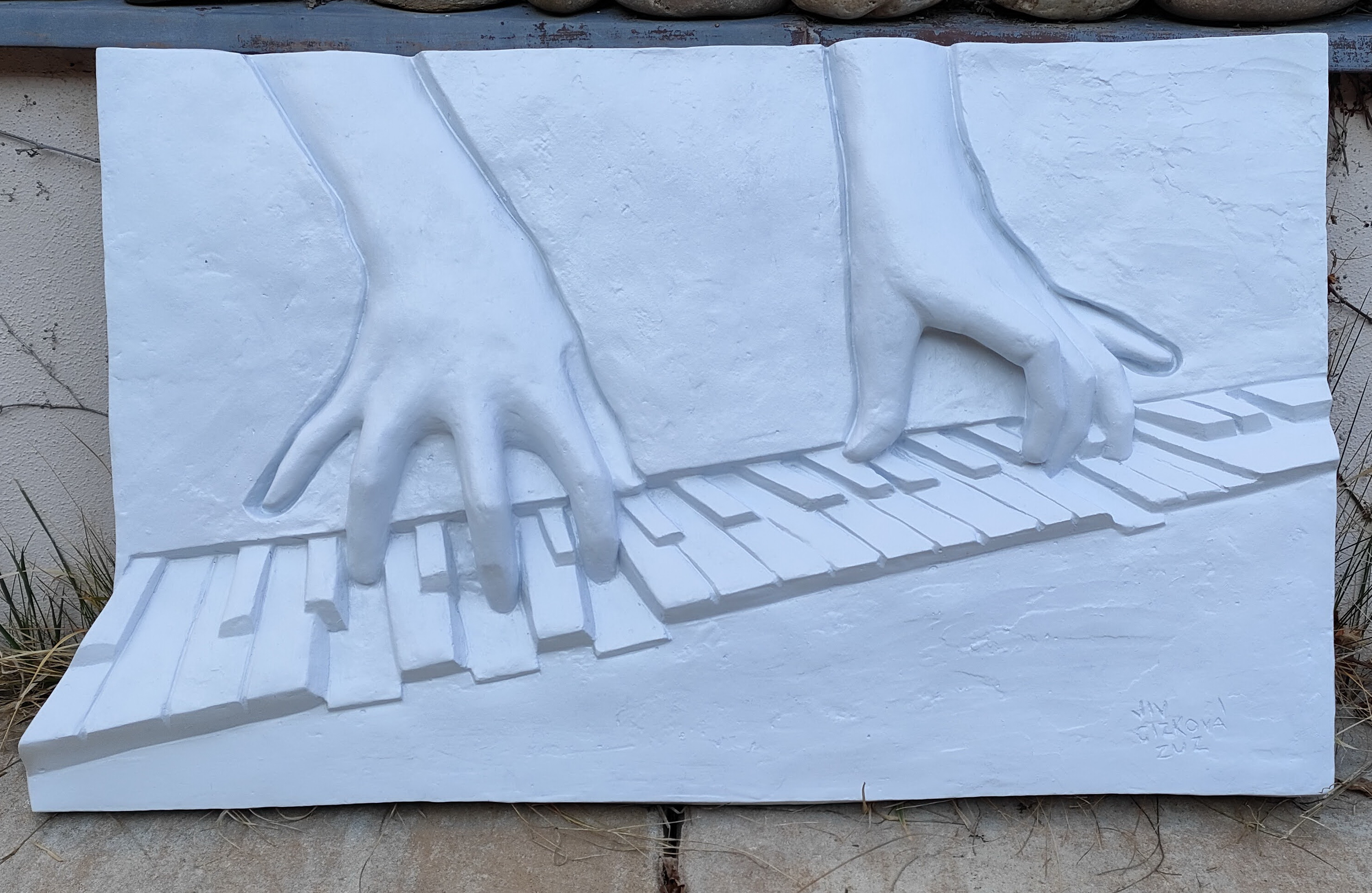
Czech Etude – patinated bronze

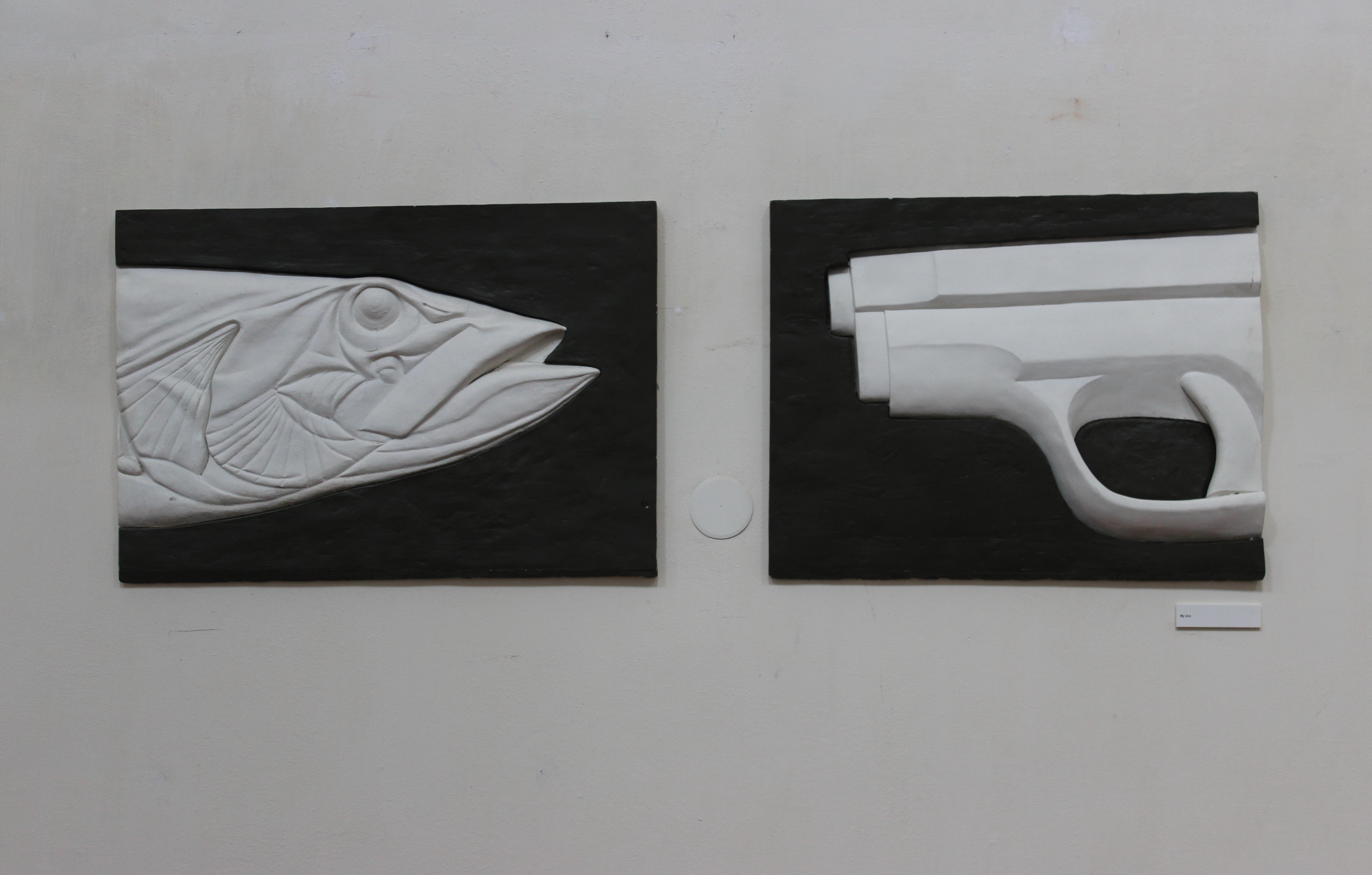
Two of Us
