= Jan Koblasa =

Czech sculptor and painter (1932–2017

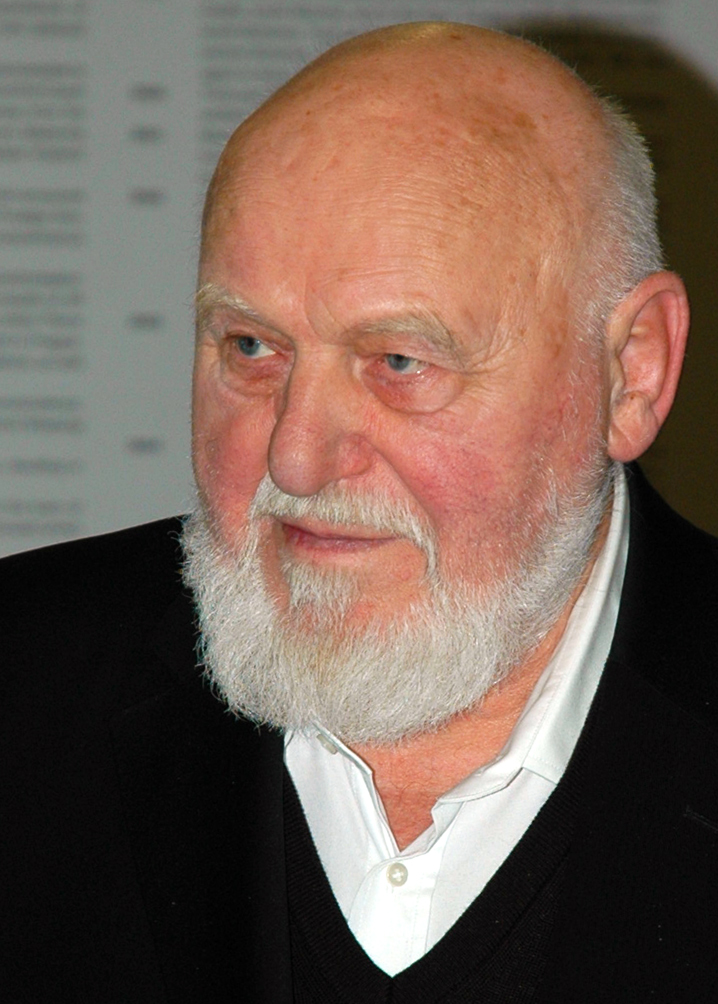
- Koblasa in 2012
- Born: 5 October 1932; Tábor, Czechoslovakia
- Died: 3 October 2017 (aged 84); Hamburg, Germany
- Education: Academy of Fine Arts in Prague, Department of Dramatic Theatre at the Academy of Performing Arts, Prague
- Known for: sculptor, painter, graphic artist, university professor, poet, writer, playwright
- Spouse: Sonia Jakuschewa
- Awards: Medal of Merit 1st class (2002)

Jan Koblasa (5 October 1932 – 3 October 2017) was a Czech sculptor, draughtsman and painter. He was a leading figure of the Czech Informel movement of the 1960s. He was also a graphic artist, poet, musician, writer and theatre designer. He was a professor at the Academy of Fine Arts in Prague.

During the Warsaw Pact invasion of Czechoslovakia, he was working in Italy and decided to emigrate. From 1969 to 1998, he was a professor and then professor emeritus of sculpture at the Muthesius Academy of Art in Kiel, where he influenced a young generation of sculptors. In 1981, he bought a house with a workshop in Hamburg and moved there in 1982. After the fall of communism in Czechoslovakia he often travelled to Czechoslovakia. In 2002, after the death of professor Karel Nepraš, he took over his studio at Prague Academy for a period of three years.

== Life ==
=== High school studies ===
Jan Koblasa was born in Tábor into a family of professional musician, bandleader of a jazz band. His mother was a dentist and later a journalist. As a child, he was interested in scouting and nature, so he enrolled in a classical high school with the intention of becoming a biologist. He began his studies during the war, but other interests soon prevailed – especially literature, music and singing, theatre, and the visual arts. After returning from forced labor, his father received an offer to become a member of a newly founded symphony orchestra in Teplice, and the family moved there at the end of 1945. Here, Koblasa continued his studies, attending the People's School of Art and theatre and art clubs at the high school. After the February coup of 1948, his mother lost her job at the radio station.

From the age of 16, he first sang in a choir, studied classical singing, and later performed as a soloist with a dance orchestra and in a church choir. After winning first place in solo singing in 1951 at a competition for young artists, he also won first place as a solo singer at a regional competition in 1952 and at the same time was offered opportunity to sing at the Teplice Opera. From his school years, Koblasa kept diaries, in which, in addition to personal notes, he also wrote his first literary attempts. Together with his classmates at grammar school (Karel Trinkewitz, Dušan Třeštík, Petr Steiner, etc.), who, like him, were interested in philosophy and banned literature, he founded a club (KSB) and published their own magazine.

In 1950, he transferred from an eight-year humanities high school to a teaching high school, where he had the opportunity to continue his sculpture training thanks to the support of his teacher Karel Švarc (a student of Karel Lidický) and also in the studio of the Teplice sculptor Lahoda. After graduating in 1952, he applied to study at the Academy of Fine Arts in Prague, successfully passed the talent exams, and despite unfavorable personnel assessments and the lack of a recommendation from his high school, he was accepted to study.

=== Academy of Fine Arts in Prague ===
Professor Jan Lauda's studio at the Academy of Fine Arts in Prague, which Koblasa joined in 1952, intended to educate future creators of socialist monuments. The atmosphere at the school was bolstered by the spying of communist students, intensive teaching of Marxism, the history of the All-Union Communist Party of Bolsheviks (VKSB), and regular military education and training. Under the constant threat of being sent to work in a factory or on a farm, a diploma was the only way to a free profession. In May 1953, at the rented room where he lived, he was ambushed and beaten by an armed group of five militia members and police officers under a false pretext.

In October 1953, Koblasa managed to transfer to the studio of Otakar Španiel, where the atmosphere was somewhat more liberal, but after Prof. Španiel's death in 1954, he was forced to finish school in the studio of Prof. Karel Pokorný a key figure of socialist realism.

Koblasa became a regular visitor to contemporary classical music concerts (Ernst Krenek), lectures at the secret existentialist club, film screenings at FAMU, actively sought information about contemporary world art and composed librettos for ballets.

In 1954, together with his classmates (Karel Nepraš, Bedřich Dlouhý, František Mertl, Theodor Pištěk, Ladislav Placatka), students from the HAMU (Jan Klusák, Jan Bedřich, Rudolf Komorous), and actors (Luděk Munzar, Jiří Sehnal, Ladislav Fialka, Eva Klepáčová) organized a dadaist party called Malmuzherciáda in the club of the Unitarian Christians in Vinohrady. The following year, some of them founded a men's club and began to meet regularly. As early as the mid-1950s, Koblasa had become friends with Václav Havel, read his writings and poems, and later attended the premieres of his plays; they often celebrated their birthdays together, as they both shared the same birthday. In the late 1950s, he met Jiří Suchý and Jiří Šlitr during their time at the Reduta club.

Jiří Šetlík arranged for Koblasa to visit the apartment of the sculptor Otto Gutfreund's brother, where a large number of sculptures and drawings had been preserved. In 1956, he took part in a trip organized by the Academy to the Soviet Union, where, thanks to a special permit, students were able to view unexhibited works by Kandinsky, Chagall, and Malevich, stored in the Hermitage's storage facilities. Meanwhile, Koblasa's work was receiving various awards (1956, school prize for his Portrait of Marie, prize for the best ballet libretto of the year). He devoted himself systematically to sculptural portraiture, painted and drew in private, wrote poetry, and printed graphic sheets and monotypes. The school management rejected invitation of Koblasa by Prof. Gustav Seitz to study in Berlin.

(JK: "The year 1957 began with spleen turning into melancholy and then into quite vulgar depression.")

In 1957, the remaining members of the club were Karel Nepraš, Bedřich Dlouhý, Koblasa, and composer Rudolf Komorous. After a minor conflict and crisis, they adopted the name Šmidrové. The Šmidras' program centered on free artistic expression and a distinctive poetics of "strangeness," which was easily understood by their intelligent audience during the era of harsh Stalinism. In April, they organized a joint exhibition on Střelecký Island with readings of poetry (Václav Havel, Jiří Paukert, JK), prose (Milena Jelinek), and performances of musical compositions by Rudolf Komorous, Jan Klusák, Rudolf Dašek, and Luboš Fišer. The school unexpectedly extended his studies by another year, and while Koblasa's private work was moving towards abstraction, influenced by his listening to contemporary music, he still had to submit realistic sculptures as school work. His final work – a female nude – was rejected and he was at risk of expulsion from school, but he ultimately saved his diploma with three realistic portraits, receiving a school award and a scholarship. Jiří Šetlík arranged for him to visit art collector Vincenc Kramář and see his confiscated collection, which included works by Filla, Kubišta, and Picasso.

=== Department of Dramatic Theatre at the Academy of Performing Arts, Prague ===
In June 1958, he passed the entrance exams for the Academy of Performing Arts in Prague and became a student of scenography under Prof. František Tröster. He exhibited 45 drawings and prints and 11 sculptural portraits at the Dílo gallery in Teplice, founded a brass band with Šmidrové, wrote the opera libretto The Trial based on Franz Kafka, but also prepared for illegal border crossing and emigration. In the same year, he acquired his first Prague studio in the basement of the Rieger Villa in Letná, met Vladimír Boudník and established a deep friendship with Mikuláš Medek. The following year, he decided to leave DAMU after two semesters of study. Thanks to Jiří Šetlík, he becomes acquainted with the hidden works of František Kupka in the National Gallery's storage facilities.

In 1959, his plans to emigrate became unrealistic. Koblasa collaborated on Vláčil's film The Dove, organized two exhibitions of his work in his own studio, and at the end of the year, Šmidrové staged a parody of Arsonist's Daughter by Josef Kajetán Tyl at the student club. His Portrait of Miss D won a bronze medal at the Junge Kunst exhibition in Vienna.

=== The 1960s ===
In early 1960, young artists prepared a group exhibition called Confrontation at Koblasa's studio. Unofficial exhibitions in the studios of Jiří Valenta and Aleš Veselý were well received by friends, and art theorists and gallery owners from Western Europe came to Prague (W. Sandberg, director of the Stedelijk Museum Amsterdam). Koblasa received an offer to exhibit in Brussels, but it was turned down by the local communist authorities. In June, the Šmidrové and invited guests organized a parody of official ceremonies at Reduta Jazz Club – a gala evening in honor of the naive poet V.S. Plumlovský. In November, Libor Pešek shoots an amateur film about the group.

At the beginning of 1961, a series of arrests and interrogations took place, members of the group were wiretapped, JK lost his creative scholarship, and all invitations to foreign internships and exhibitions were turned down by the authorities. In the summer, the Cuban Missile Crisis erupted and JK was called up for military service in Libavá. He secretly went on hunger strike, collapsing after two weeks. He spent the rest of the year in hospital.

The year 1962 was marked by further bans on exhibitions abroad and in Prague, a disaster in his apartment, a suspicious visit from uninvited guests and the demolition of his studio, interrogation by the State Security Service, and the confession of former high school classmates that they were StB informers. He was unofficially represented at exhibitions in Washington, D.C. (Art since 1950) and Warsaw (Argumenty 62). Koblasa created his first wooden sculptures in Teplice and prepared an interior design for the Church of Saints Peter and Paul in Jedovnice.

In 1963, together with Mikuláš Medek, he received permission to exhibit sculptures and paintings in the riding hall of Teplice Castle. The exhibition became a landmark cultural event. In collaboration with architect Karel Filsak, he received commissions for architectural projects (the hall of Košice International Airport – with Mikuláš Medek, office of Warsaw Chopin Airport) and installed an altar relief with a painting by Mikuláš Medek in Jedovnice. At the same time, he was informed that the Ministry of the Interior had issued a ban on the export of his works and a ban on their purchase for gallery collections. D. Mahlow, director of the Kunsthalle in Baden-Baden, selected some of his monotypes for an exhibition there. He was invited to participate in the Documenta exhibition in Kassel, but was not allowed to attend.

In 1964, the Šmidrové founded the Palette of Motherland ice hockey club, but JK soon gave up his membership. An exhibition of sculptures in Litoměřice and Exhibition D in Nová síň Gallery in Prague were permitted, but its reprise in Ostrava and an exhibition of imaginative art in Hluboká nad Vltavou were banned. His passport was confiscated. JK won the competition for a relief wall for the Prague airport. As a set designer, he participated in Vláčil's film Marketa Lazarová, and director Otomar Krejča invited him to create masks for the staging of Josef Topol's play The End of Carnival at the National Theatre.

At the beginning of 1965, JK obtained permission to hold exhibitions abroad in Berlin and Baden-Baden, and was represented at exhibitions in Munich, Liège and Aquileia, but other exhibitions were rejected (Paris, Mánes), and due to the intervention of the Central Committee of the Communist Party of Czechoslovakia, the competition for the hall at Ruzyně Airport was to be canceled, and the ban on exporting his sculptures and travelling abroad was extended. The National Gallery Prague purchased the sculpture King, Otomar Krejča commissioned the set design for Masquerade in Ostende for the newly founded the theatre Divadlo za branou.

In 1966, Koblasa married Klára Gočárová. His reworked version of the model for Ruzyně Airport large scale relief Eternal Life was finally approved for realisation, and his first solo exhibition opened in the Czechoslovak Writers' Hall. After an unexpected visit by an officer of the StB to his studio, he obtained a conditional passport and permission to travel to his exhibition in Bochum. Koblasa embarked on his first three-week trip around Europe (Kassel, Amsterdam, Haag, Rotterdam, Brusels, Paris). He exhibited in Syracuse, New York, but continued to be excluded from group exhibitions abroad.

In the first half of 1967, when work on the Ruzyně relief was delayed by problems with obtaining materials, he arranged for an apartment and studio. He completed work for Church of Saints Peter and Paul in Jedovnice, participated in a sculpture symposium in Slovakia, draw masks for Krejča's production at the Burgtheater and engraved a series of prints for Apocalypse. He spent the summer in the Vysočina region with Zbyšek Sion and at Václav Havel's summer house. In the fall, he travels to Münster for the opening of his exhibition and then takes a train trip to galleries and monuments in Germany, Switzerland, Italy, and Austria. The Art Center continues ban to export his painting to Vienna.

In 1968, he began work on reliefs for the Czechoslovak airlines hall in Rabat, completed the interior of the church in Kotvrdovice, received a commission for the Czechoslovak mission to the United Nations in Geneva, and planned to build his own house. In May, he left for Germany on a working stay in Hof Dodau and created sculptures for an exhibition in Kiel as part of Kielerwoche and for a subsequent exhibition in Hamburg. His assistant at the time was Čestmír Krátký, a photographer from Liberec. From there, he takes a vacation trip to Italy, where he receives news of the occupation of Czechoslovakia by Warsaw Pact troops. He postpones his return to Prague indefinitely and tries to find work in Italy. The editorial staff of the magazine "Sešity," whose office had been occupied by soldiers of the invading army in August, found temporary refuge in his Prague studio.

First, he prints a series of lithographs entitled "Jonah and the Whale" at the Il Bisonte gallery and publishing house (Florence), then rents a studio in Milan and creates sculptures for negotiated exhibitions in Milan, Genoa, and Legnano and Paris Gallery Lambert.

At the beginning of 1969, he lived with his wife in a temporary apartment in Milan, drew the complete set for the performance of "Lorenzaccio" at the Divadlo za branou (200 costumes and masks), and explored the possibility of emigrating to the United States or Canada. In addition to Italy, he exhibited in Germany (Celle, Hanover), travelled to Paris, and from there to Geneva to carry out an assignment at the Czechoslovak Mission to the United Nations. The ambassador's office behaved with hostility, and at the same time his visa expired and it was impossible to leave. In July 1969, he finally received a visa from Germany and, while preparing to emigrate to the United States, he received an offer to establish a sculpture school at the Muthesius Academy of Art in Kiel, where he then worked until 1998.

=== Life in emigration ===
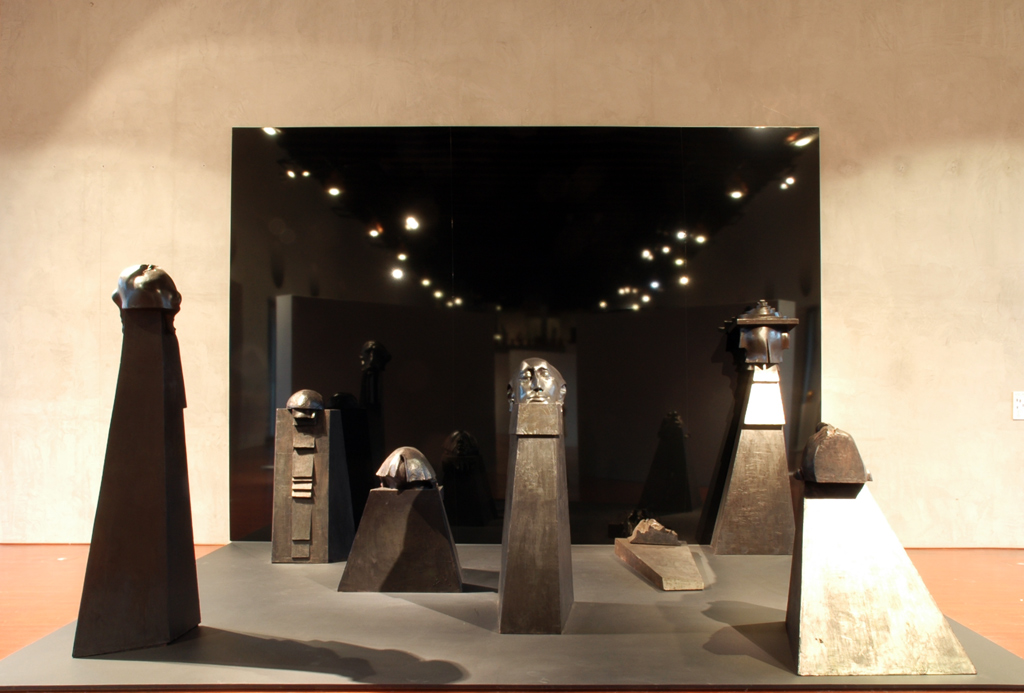
The Wailing Wall (1974)

After the Koblasas moved to Kiel, Czechoslovakia closed its borders in October 1969, refused to extend their visas, and threatened to prosecute them. ...just as a person whose boat has suddenly sunk must start swimming...

The early days of Koblasa's tenure at the Muthesius Hochschule in Kiel were marked by difficulties in obtaining political asylum and by students who were still experiencing the aftermath of the leftist revolt of 1968 and the hippie movement. In 1969, Koblasa founded his sculpture studio and began lecturing to architecture students; the following year, he was appointed full associate professor and exhibited in several countries (Kiel, Oslo, Stavanger, Trondheim, Milano).

In 1971, he travelled to the United States. In Czechoslovakia, he was sentenced to nine years in prison for illegally leaving the country; his works were hidden in storage and partially confiscated. He exhibited his drawings in Venice, the French canton of Vence, Brescia, and received an award at the Graphic Arts Biennial in Ljubljana.

In 1972, he was appointed professor, and after obtaining an asylum passport, he decided to settle permanently in Germany. He bought a house in Tökendorf, travelled frequently throughout Europe, and secured his first major public commissions. His private work still grappled with the traumas of emigration (Ecce homo, The Wailing Wall).

In the years that followed, he continued to struggle with the leftist sentiments among students, while he himself was battling depression and terrifying dreams of emigration and trying to stay in touch with friends who were also abroad (Věra Linhartová, Jiří Valenta, Jan Kotík, Ivan Nosek, František Mertl, Milan Stuchlík, Ladislav Holý, Antonín Málek, Arsén Pohribný, Petr Spielmann). Acclimating to a new environment with vast horizons—which contrasted with the verticality of the human form—along with sudden changes in the weather and the prudence and Protestant simplicity of the local people, introduced new elements into Koblasa's work, as well as a desire for structure and order.

In 1974, he was nominated for the position of dean at the school, but he chose to focus on teaching and his own artistic work instead. He took students on trips to Berlin, Greece, and Paris; organized sculpture symposia for them in Anröchte; and founded the Lornsenstraße Gallery in Kiel with them. In 1975, he received a scholarship from the Károlyi Foundation in Vence, Provence.

His marital crisis ended in divorce in 1977. Koblasa then took a three-year sabbatical. Unable to find peace and focus in Europe, he flew to New York City the following year, where he received news of his father's death. In the first half of 1979, he prepared a production of Alfred de Musset's play Lorenzaccio for the theatre festival in Avignon (directed by Otomar Krejča) and later a production of Chekhov's Three Sisters. He travelled to the United States. again but unsuccessfully attempted to extend his leave from school. Beginning in 1980, he was plagued by health problems, inner turmoil, loneliness, and the inability to obtain German citizenship. He spent summer on Ibiza and visited Israel.

The following year he resumed teaching in Kiel, visited England, Scotland and Egypt, and bought a house with a studio in Hamburg and moved there in 1982. Through competitions, he won major public commissions for sculptures in several cities in Germany (Dietrichsdorf, 1982; Lübeck, 1983; Flensburg; the Norderstedt courthouse, 1984; Elmshorn, 1985; Kiel in 1986, 1988, and 1989, Neumünster, Swisttal, 1989) and for a statue of Saint John Nepomuk Neumann in the National Chapel in Washington, D.C..

Koblasa travelled frequently (1971 Vence, Brescia, United States, 1975 Italy, Provence, 1977 Portugal, stay in Munich, 1978 New York City, 1979 Belgium, France, west of United States, 1980 stay in Munich, Bonn, 1981 England, Scotland, 1983 New York City, 1984 Paris, 1988 United States, Sweden, 1989 Israel), working during the summer at sculpture symposia (Brøby in Sweden), in Carrara, or with students in Anröchte. In 1984, he was appointed head of the Department of Art in Kiel.

He participated in an exhibition of artists in exile in Berlin (1986) and an exhibition marking the 20th anniversary of the occupation of Czechoslovakia (Brussels, 1987).

His prison sentence in Czechoslovakia, reduced to 2.5 years following amnesties, still prevented him from obtaining German citizenship in 1988. In early 1989, Koblasa participated in a sculpture symposium in Israel and took a trip with students to visit Egyptian monuments. He no longer had enough space in his studio in Hamburg, so at the end of the year he moved to a former small factory for measuring instruments in the neighborhood.

During the Velvet Revolution in Czechoslovakia, Koblasa attempted to obtain a visa to travel to Prague, but as late as December 1989, he was informed that his sentence had not yet been pardoned. He was ultimately able to return to his homeland only in June 1990, when he participated at the renewed sculpture symposium in Hořice.

He died in Hamburg on 3 October 2017, two days before his 85th birthday. A requiem was held in his honour on 20 October of that year at St. Antonius Church on Lattenkamp Street in Hamburg.

=== Returns to the Czech Republic ===
In the 1990s, Koblasa regularly participated in sculpture symposia in Bohemia (Hořice, where he exhibited his sculptures such as "The Great Sacrifice," 1990; Deštné v Orlických horách, "The End of Totalitarianism," 1993, České Budějovice in 1996, Klášter Hradiště nad Jizerou in 1999, Dobřichovice in 2003), but he no longer anticipated a permanent return. He introduced his German students to Czech Baroque art. His offer to teach at the AVU in Prague was rejected (1990), and it was not until 2002, after the death of Professor Karel Nepraš, that he took over his studio for a period of three years.

His first exhibition of sculptures in Prague after a hiatus of more than twenty years took place in 1991 at the Queen Anne's Summer Palace (Belvedere) under the patronage of President Václav Havel. That same year, the exhibition was moved to Germany as part of a joint project between Prague and Hamburg.

In 1992, he met the Russian avantgarde painter Sonia Jakuschewa in Germany. She began collaborating with him on several projects, and the following year she married him in Denmark. While on vacation together in Ibiza in 1995, they accepted an offer to set up a second studio there, where he went on to create a number of paintings and smaller sculptures.

In 1995, Koblasa stayed as a guest of honor at the German Academy's Villa Massimo in Rome. In 1998, he ended his teaching career in Kiel. He continued to create monumental sculptures during his stays abroad—in Aswan (2000), Mérida, Venezuela (2002), Anröchte (2002, 2005), and in Schleswig (2005). On the occasion of the millennium celebration of the bishopric in Bamberg, he created the stone sculpture "Five Narrow Gates of Life" in Forchheim.

In the Czech Republic in 2000 (together with Sonia Jakuschewa), he designed the interior of the chapel in Bílka (architect Ivan Nosek) and subsequently (2002) carried out the international sculpture project "The Path of Friendship" (under the patronage of President Havel): fourteen monumental stone sculptures. He participated in the "Path of Marble" symposium (Dobřichovice 2003) and, from 2004 to 2010, designed the monument and overall concept for the Gustav Mahler park in Jihlava.

In 2007, a retrospective exhibition titled "Dialogues with Matter" was organized to mark his 75th birthday at the Regional Gallery in Jihlava and the Regional Gallery in Liberec. After 2010, he left his home and studio in Ibiza. He was forced to undergo joint surgery. He completed his colorful wooden sculptures in Germany and worked on a portrait of Rainer Maria Rilke, a native of Prague.

In 2012, a major retrospective exhibition marking Koblasa's 80th birthday was opened under the patronage of President Václav Klaus at the Prague Castle Riding Hall, and an exhibition of his works from the 1960s ("False Prophets") at the Neues Museum in Nuremberg.

Koblasa's sculpture "Resurrection" was installed in St. Vitus Cathedral in 2013 to mark the anniversary of the Velvet Revolution.

In the summer of 2026, an exhibition titled "In Spite of the Ban", which explores the legendary exhibition by Koblasa and Mikuláš Medek held in August 1963 in the castle riding hall in Teplice, was opened in Gallery of Fine Arts in Cheb. In October 2026, the exhibition was reinstalled at the Museum Kampa in Prague.

=== Awards received ===
- 1958 Award and scholarship of the Academy of Fine Arts in Prague
- 1959 Junge Kunst Vienna, bronze medal
- 1971 Ljubljana Biennale of Graphic Arts (Totentanz)
- 1974 Hildesheim City Cultural Award
- 2002 Medal of Merit, 1st grade

== Work ==
Koblasa is a founding figure of Czech postwar art. He mastered a wide variety of sculptural techniques and is distinguished by his extraordinary sensitivity to the nature of the sculptural materials he used. Koblasa and other artists of his generation were among the pioneers of Czech Informel. In addition to Surrealism and Abstract expressionism, he drew inspiration from the intense spiritual expression of the Czech Baroque and the sculptures of František Bílek, as well as the writings of Franz Kafka and Ladislav Klíma. His search for inspiration in history is deeply rooted in the genius loci of his birthplace, Christianity, his reading, music, and philosophy. His ongoing dialogue with matter, his philosophical perception of the world, and his difficult personal circumstances led to the creation of works with profound intellectual content. Koblasa expresses himself through parables, symbols, and metaphors that refer to the forces of evil and human tyranny, but also to the power of faith and hope in a just world. Koblas's works are based on his initial ideas about a given theme, which he then refines through his interaction with the material during the creative process in open cycles. In Koblasa's early works, there is a conceptual affinity with artists such as Jacques Lipchitz, Lynn Chadwick, Kenneth Armitage, or Germaine Richier; however, the pathos of his later works—featuring stone blocks and symbolically conceived wooden forms—represents a conceptually concentrated body of work that combines a sense of elemental form with meditation and a mythical message. Part of the creative process involved suppressing rational control and embracing unbridled obsession in the struggle with matter as an act of identifying with the fundamental forces of life and nature. In the context of an era in which Czech modern art was affected by a series of dramatic historical upheavals and simultaneously confronted with diverse artistic trends from the Western world, his literary testimony regarding the artist's subjective feelings and the era itself is particularly valuable.

=== Sculptures ===
==== Modelling ====
At the Teplice Gymnasium (Boredom, 1952) and later during his studies at the Academy of Fine Arts in Prague, Koblasa focused on sculpting portraits (Syphilitic Girl, 1953; Self-Portrait, 1954; Portrait of Mary, 1957). As an undisputed talent, he received awards from his school, a prize at an exhibition of young sculptors in Vienna, and a creative scholarship as graduate. In contrast to his school assignments, which were predominantly realistic in style, his free-form portraits reflected a persistent sense of personal threat from the Stalinist regime of the time and carried a strongly existential undertone (We're in It Up to Our Necks, 1957, He Who Is Afraid, 1957; Salome—or How Easy It Is to Lose One's Head, 1957).

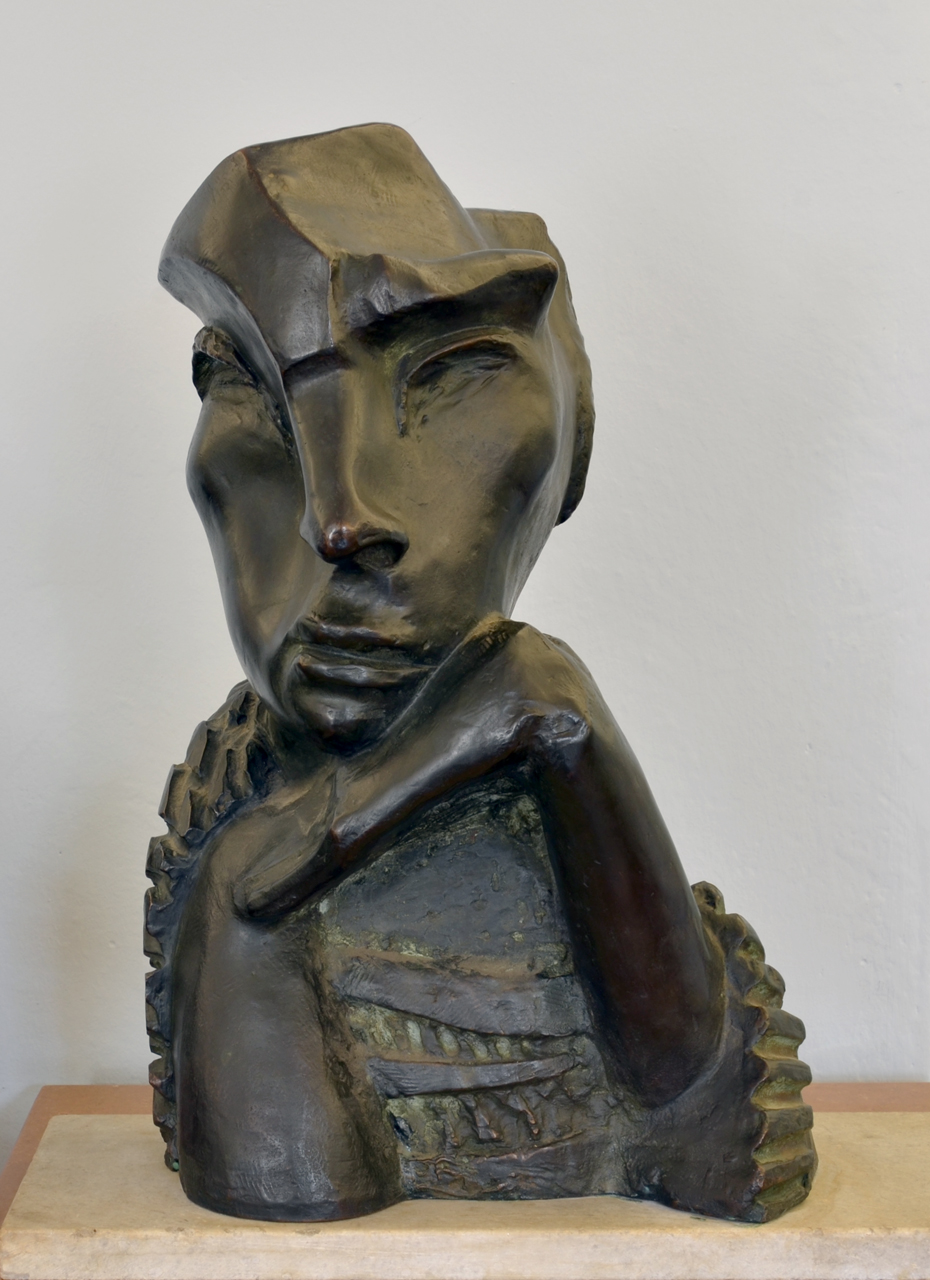
Boredom, bronze (1952)

Syphilitic Girl (1953)

Portrait of miss D (1957)

Portrait of Mary (1957), Museum Kampa

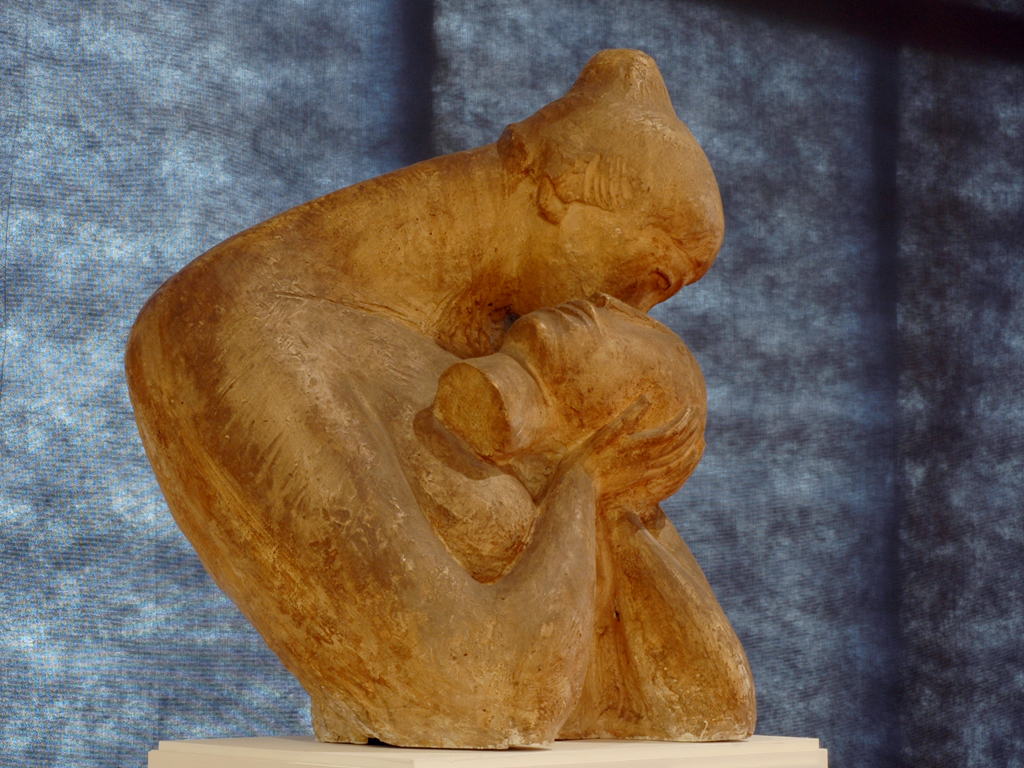
Salome — or How Easy It Is to Lose One's Head (1956)

By the late 1950s, he had already moved rapidly away from realistic portraits toward simplifying and flattening the forms of his figures (The Return of the Prodigal Son, 1958) and, by eliminating representational elements, toward radical abstraction (the reliefs The Labyrinth of the World, 1958). Koblasa thus responded to the oppressive atmosphere of the 1950s by exploring primordial human messages and returning to rituals and biblical and archaic myths. The search for a point of reference and a new starting point became both a spiritual source and one of the fundamental tendencies of his work. Myth encompassed all human deeds as well as the sum of ancient traditions and binding norms. Depicting mythical figures meant stepping outside one's own time and becoming a participant in ancient stories.

The sculpture The Return of the Prodigal Son is an expression of Koblas's meditative focus and represents a basic form that, despite its expressive economy, is capable of conveying a complex message. The two-dimensional shell of the body bears the traces of lived experience, while the ovoid head is a zone of harmony and spiritual balance. In his later works, the elemental primitivism of the overall form is combined with sensitive modeling, and despite its apparent brutality, it avoids all the pitfalls of academic training (Magdalene, 1959; St. Sebastian, 1958, Young man weeping, 1961). The internal continuity of his artistic vision was also evident in the largest commission he received in the second half of the 1960s—the relief "Gateway to Space" for the new Ruzyně Airport building (covering an area of 4.5 × 42 m in the main departure hall). This monumental work was based on Koblasa's richly figurative and imaginative interpretation of the Apocalypse, a subject he had explored in previous years.

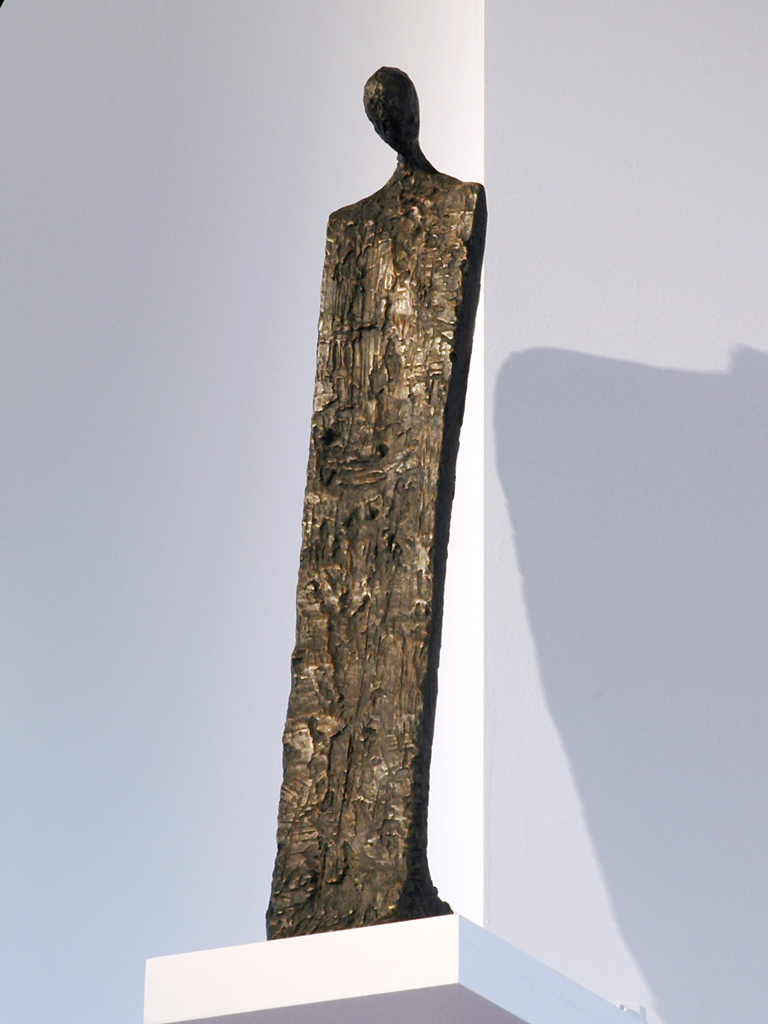
The Prodigal Son (1958)

Reclining young woman (1958)

St. Sebastian (1958)

St. Magdalene (1959)

Young man weeping (1961)

Driven by the need to capture the experience of life, the theme of the head at the turn of the 1950s and 1960s evolved into a drama of psychological processes (Head, 1959; Model of My Brain, 1961). Instead of the usual modeling of the skull and face, Koblasa uses imprints whose dynamic structure evokes the activity of vital forces. The idea of the imprint is symbolically interpreted in the series Veronica's Veil, whose expressiveness reveals the materiality of the artwork as a dark and dense plan of realization, where personal psychological energies intersect with universal spiritual symbolism. The Offering series (1960), a collection of double-sided reliefs made of patinated plaster and installed in space, marks a transition to the wooden sculptures of the early 1960s.

Koblasa then returned to modeling in a series of sculptures through which he sought to come to terms with the trauma of emigration. The depiction of the head here ranges from amorphousness to highly stylized modeling, conveying the personal losses and feelings of despair, anguish, and uncertainty associated with forced exile (Lamenta, 1970; Sticking Out the Tongue, 1970; Yellow River, 1971; Ecce Homo, 1972). The intensity of the expression, in which the polyvalent, formless head contrasts with the naturalistically rendered protruding tongue, evokes a range of associations, from defiance to despair and helplessness. The installation Big vomiter – Ecce homo takes this statement to the extreme as the body's immediate reaction to psychological trauma. The Laments series (1970) depicts an inward-turned, wounding, and agonizing torment. The urgency of the sculptures is underscored by cracked vaults, which transform them into structures of pain, as well as by realistically rendered details—such as hands clasped over the head or gaping mouths with exposed teeth. In 1970, Koblasa reached the depths of his crisis and broke free from rock bottom with the series of sculptures Attempt at a Smile. The sculpture is an expression of contemplation leading to liberation from pain and the regaining of mental balance. It is followed by drawings and wooden and stone sculptures on the theme of Buddha, with the open hole serving as a symbol of openness toward the unknown.

A frequent theme is theatre (Hamlet, 1974) or literary works — The Wailing Wall (1974), inspired by James Joyce's book Ulysses.

==== Synthetic materials ====
Some of the sculptures were created under difficult conditions shortly after his emigration, and their subject matter also called for a specific artistic treatment. These include the series Lamenta, Sticking Out the Tongue (1970), and the installation Ecce homo (The Big Vomit) (1972), as well as The Wailing Wall — originally created as clay models and later cast in plastic. The spatial installations Yellow river (Léthé), Trap (1971) and The Last Round and Happy End (1973) are also made of colored plastic. These represent the position of the individual in a world that is limited and yet open to the outside.

Some of his later sculptures combine plastic and polychrome wood (Hamlet-Polonius, Intimacy, 1974). The sculpture The Pink Cavalier (1970) combines the modeling of highly sensual physiological tension with the rigidity of the wooden support-shell.

The small-scale sculptures (Laments, Sticking Out the Tongue) were later cast in bronze, as was The Wailing Wall (1974)

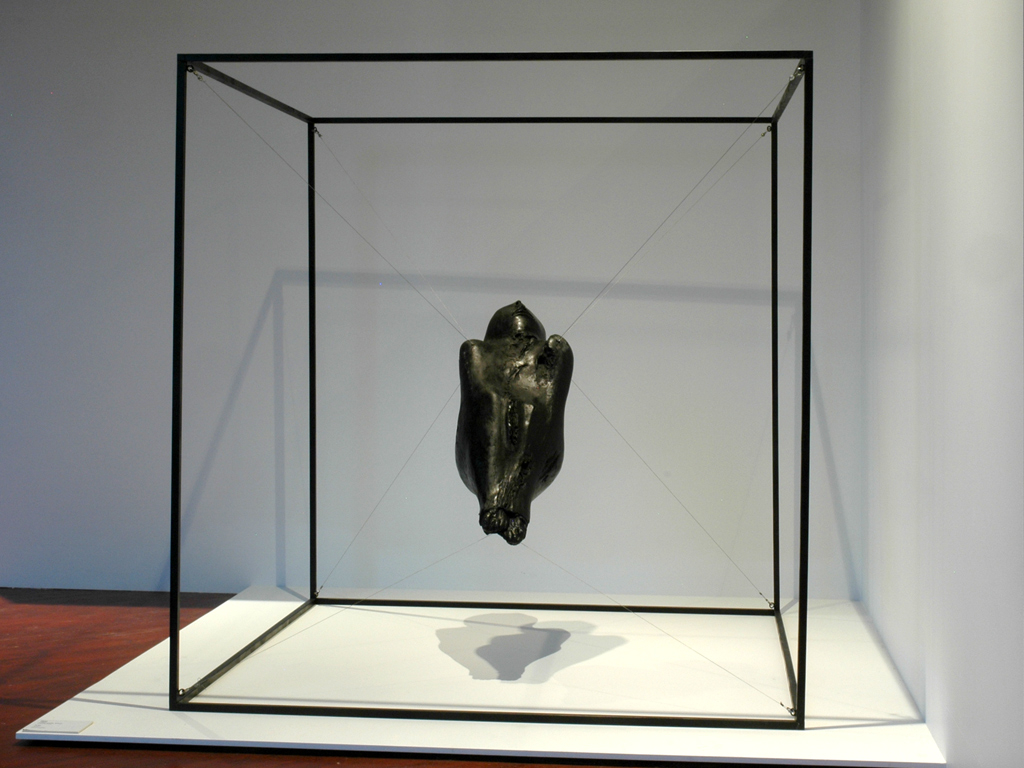
Trap (1970)

Sticking Out the Tongue (1970)

Ecce homo (The Big Vomit) (1972)

Laments (1970)

Laments II (1970)

Lament of Job (1970)

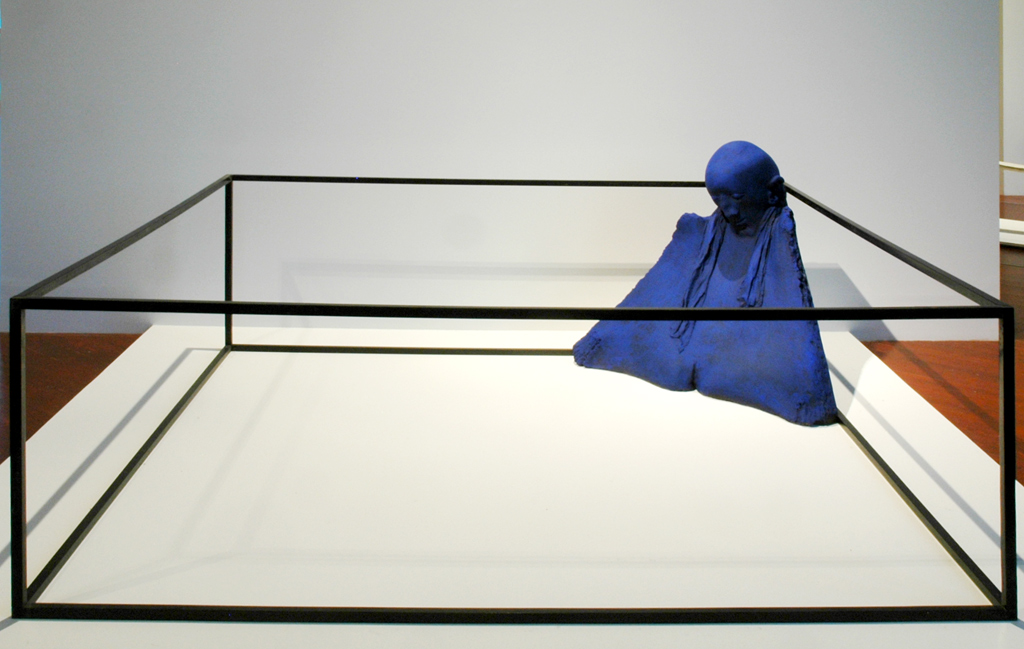
The last round (1973)

Happy End (1973–74)

Hamlet (Polonius), 1973–1974

Intimacy (1974)

==== Fired clay and ceramics ====
Ceramic clay, as an easily accessible material, initially helped him get through the early years of his emigration (Yellow River, Lethe, Birds, 1971; small glazed clay sculptures of Buddha, 1973). In collaboration with ceramicists, he later created engraved drawings on ceramic vases (1974) and painted vases (1975). He returned to fired, engobed clay in the series Golem (1983), Exodus (1996), and an installation Barokoko - windows for the Klenová Ceramics Symposium in 2012.

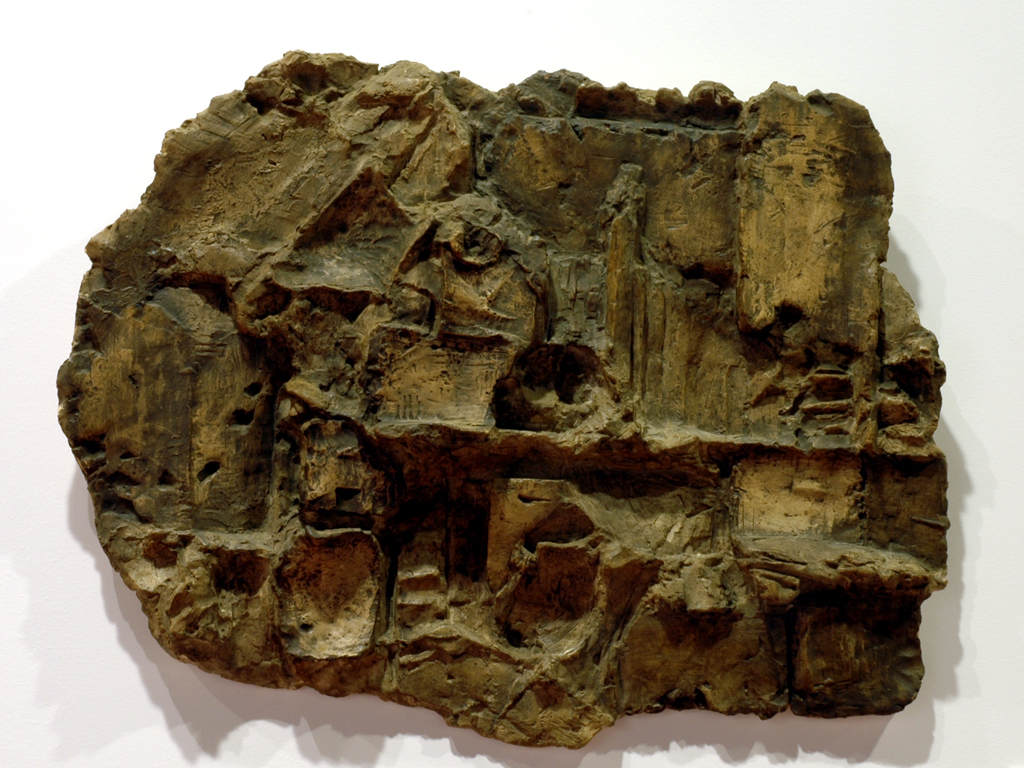
Head (1959)

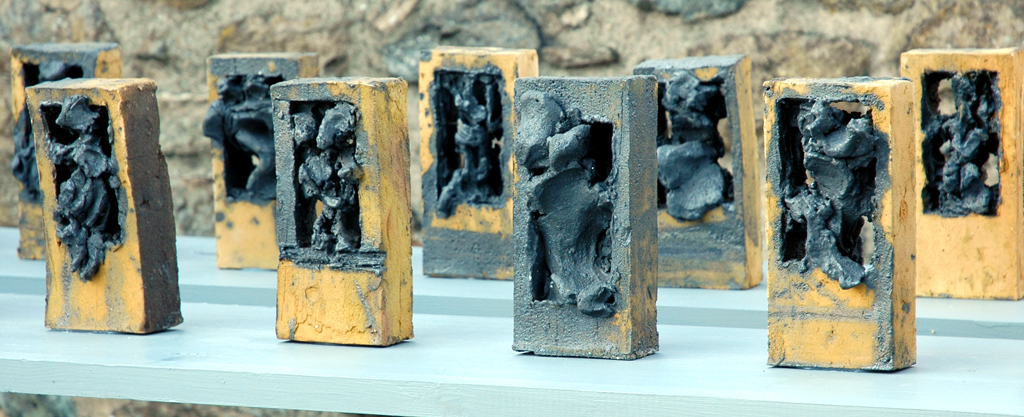
Barokoko - windows, baked engobed clay (2012)

==== Wood ====
After completing his studies, Koblasa devoted himself exclusively to painting and graphic art, returning to sculpture, this time in wood, in 1962, when he came across a felled elm tree in the garden of the house. His works emerged from a fierce, impulsive struggle with the material to achieve a new richly structured and expressive form — from cutting, chopping, drilling, and working with chisels to the final purification by fire and preserving. The emphasized verticality of the sculptures refers to the figurative foundation and the upright posture as the primary position of human existence in relation to the world.

In the years that followed, this intense focus gave rise to series of figurative sculptures (Dwarfs, 1962; Kings, 1962; Madonnas, 1964; Splitting, 1965; Prophets, 1966; False Prophets, 1966; In Praise of Oblivion 1968) as well as abstract symbols (Target, 1963; Anointed Head, 1963; Bad Omen, 1964). The larger-than-life Nike (Black Angel) dates from 1967. In 1968, within a few weeks, he created a series of 30 sculptures for an exhibition in Kiel (Man and Woman), and toward the end of that same year, sculptures for exhibitions in Milan (David) and Legnano (The Great Silence). In Kiel, he created a series of smaller wooden models of variable sculptures without a fixed base (The Desire to Embrace, 1969), that are based on a floor plan and embody the harmonious fluidity of an all-encompassing gestural movement. Together with the "Spectator" series of sculptures (1968–1969), they bear no resemblance to the sculptor's earlier work and, with their ideoplastic nature, resemble cult objects.

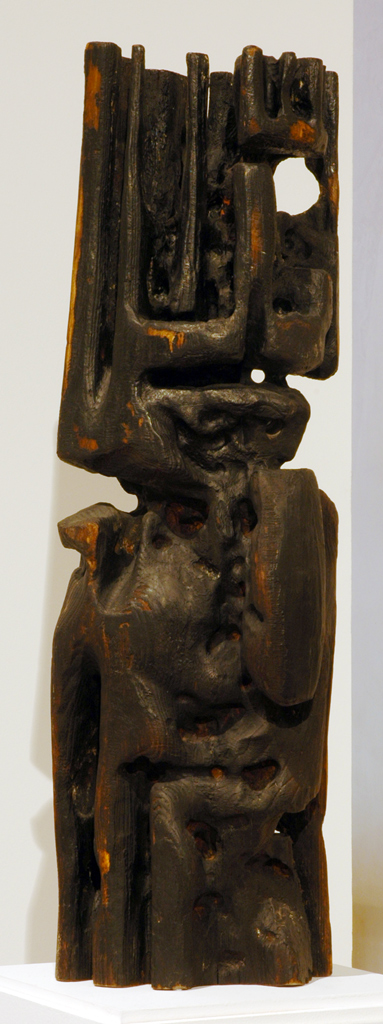
King (1962)

King I (1962)

King of the Kings (1962)

Nice Lady (1962)

A Cage Too Tight (1963)

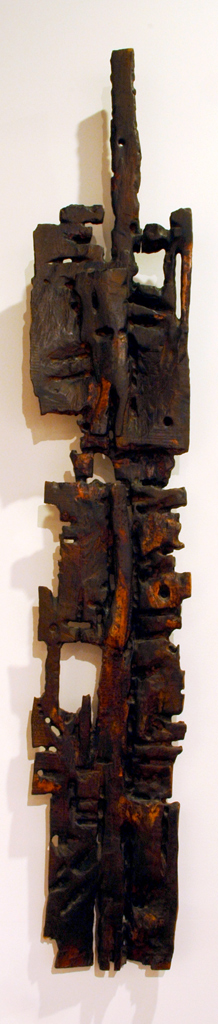
Target (1963)

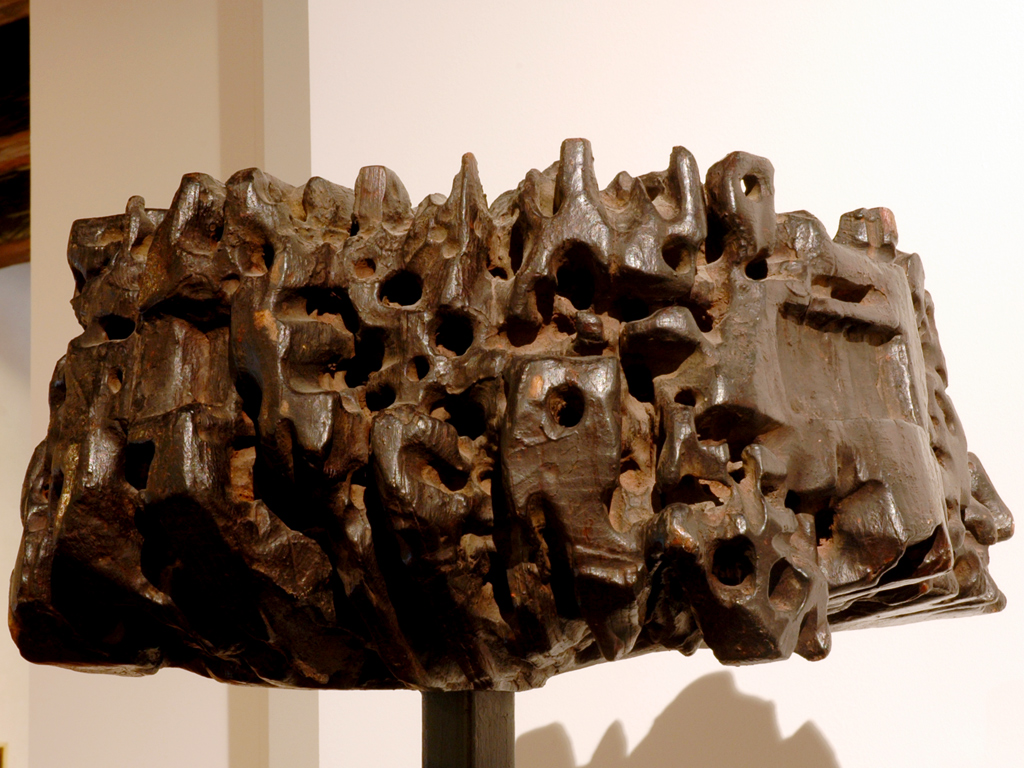
Anointed Head (1963)

Beautiful Lady with Her Page (1965)

The Aged Comedian (1965)

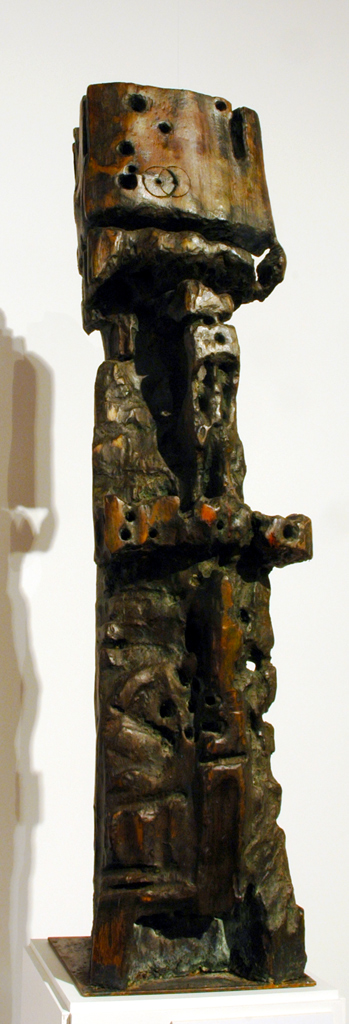
JProphet (1966–1967)

Since 1973, his busts and heads have sometimes been polychromed (Janus, 1973–1977), as well as his "Actors" series (The Comedian, 1973; Daphne, 1975; Berenice, 1981). The Actors series serves as a counterpoint to the monumental, poignant weight of despair conveyed by the seven heads of The Wailing Wall (1973), which serves as a kind of commentary on James Joyce's Ulysses. The motif for the Actors series was the duality of personality and role, reflected in the contrapuntal completion of the sculptural form with paint, which obscures or disrupts anthropomorphic features. A wide range of literary characters — from Othello to Berenice to Winnetou bring to life stories of both human happiness and misfortune. Koblasa's work, which heralded a wave of Neo-expressionism, was initially rejected and did not gain recognition until the 1990s. At the same time as the Actors sculptures, he began creating, starting in 1973, an entire series of sculptures on the theme of the Roman god of "beginnings", Janus, whose dual nature — gazing both into the past and the future, he fused into a unified, succinctly conceived form.

Sculptures inspired by biblical motifs (The Great Passion, 1976; The Messengers, 1976, 1978, 1986; Levitation, 1976; The Guardian, 1978) are characterized by an emphasized verticality, through which JKoblasa draws on the legacy of Gothic art.

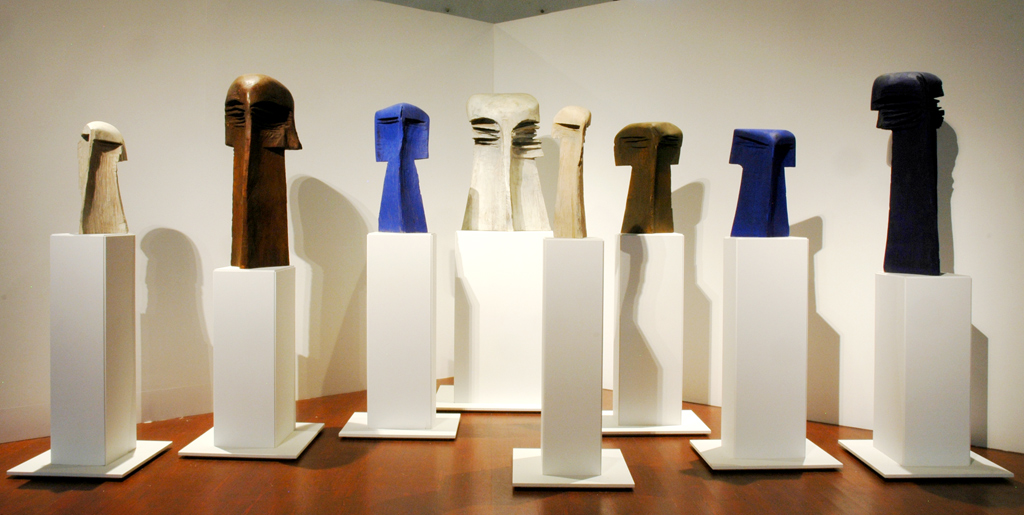
Janus I-VIII, polychrome wood (1973–1976)

Actors (1973–79)

Actor Berenice (1976–1979)

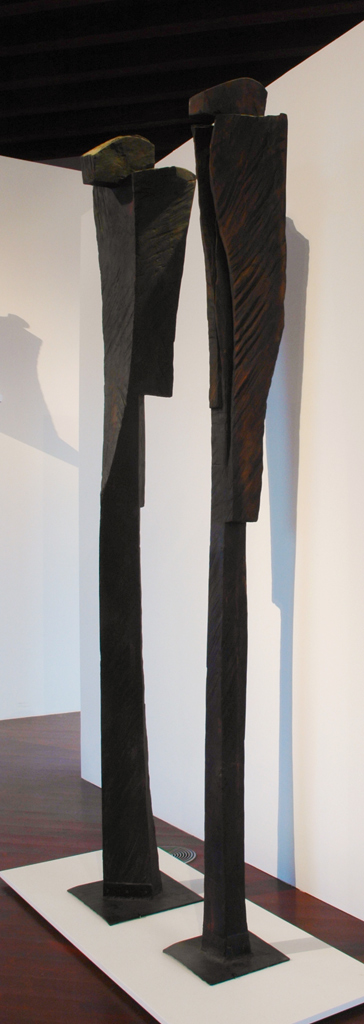
The Messengers (1986)

Penelope (1998), České Budějovice

From the late 1970s, he explored the limits of abstract representation in a series of minimalist stelae (Poles, 1978) and sculptures featuring contrasting white stripes that stand in for light. This led to the creation of the spatial installation Ritual (Bonn, 1981) and the relief Dead Wood. The theme of the death of a tree was revisited in 1983 in the installation Forest and a year later in Agony and Dead Meadowland. Since the mid-1980s, Koblasa has often finished his wooden sculptures with striking polychromy (Aged Punk, Winged Messenger, 1985; New Charles Bridge, 1988; Sharon, United States).

At the turn of the 1980s and 1990s, he created both intimate works (Headaches, 1987) and monumental, robust compositions made of stained wood, such as The Return of the Prodigal Son, 1989, The Sacrifice (Abraham and Isaac), 1989, Dead Mother (Reversed Pietà), 1991, Monsieur la Guerre, 1994, or the series of black-and-white Apocalyptic Messengers (1986) and Messengers (1987–1990). With their slender verticality, these works symbolize the connection between Earth and the Cosmos, while also serving as a silent reminder of something oppressive and irreversible. The sculptures Memories (1994) and Fly (1994), suggesting the illusion of takeoff, evoke the striking vertical ascent of the wood's naturally formed line. The newly regained possibility of returning to his native country also evoked, in Memories, the former techniques of spontaneous penetration through the mass of wood. The six oak sculptures of the Meistersinger date from 2001.

The 1997 installation—Two Friends Gazing at the Moon (after C.D. Friedrich)—combines polychrome sculptures (240 cm) with a digital image.
The large-scale sculpture Exodus, from 2000, features white and black symbols on a gray background that enhance the sculptural effect.
Polychromy is often used to emphasize the expressive effect of the sculptures, as in the series Demons of the 20th Century (2006/7), and is characteristic of Koblasa's work after 2004 (The Water Sprite and Rusalka, The Golden Calf, 2004, Carmen (2006), La Traviata (2007), Paradise—Adam, Eve, and the Serpent (2010)). Some of the polychromed sculptures were finished by his wife Sonia Jakusheva (Angels, 2008–2013).

Return of the prodigal son (1988–89)

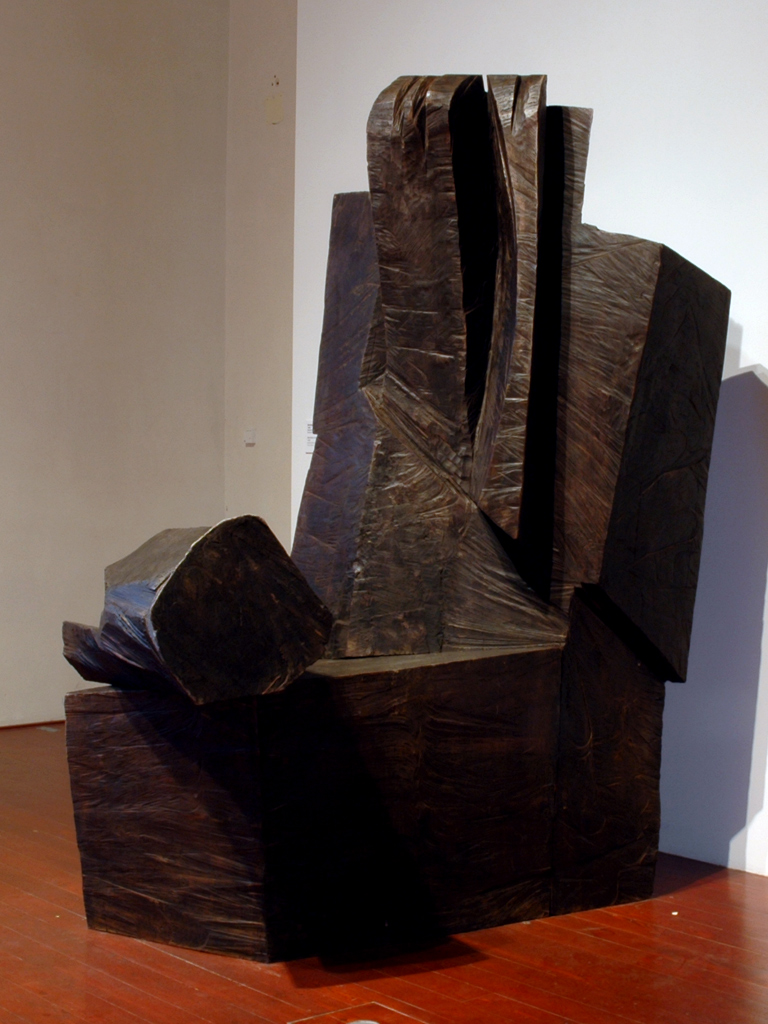
Sacrifice (1989)

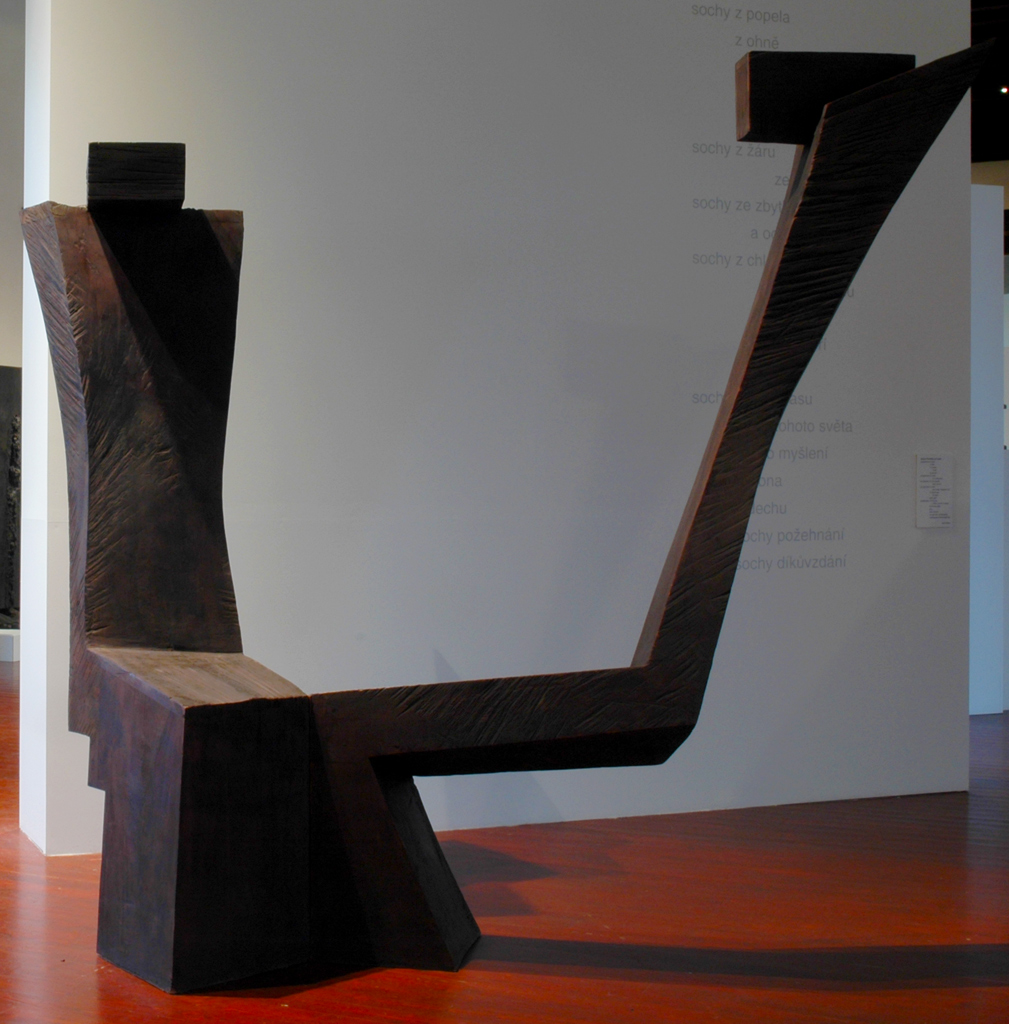
Conversation - Adieu (1991)

Dead Mother (reversed Pietá), 1991

Monsieur la guerre (1993–1994)

Water Nymph and the Water Sprite (2003–2004)

Golden Calf (2004)

Adam, Eve, Snake (2010)

Exodus (2000)

Angels, polychrome wood (2004–13), with Sonia Jakuscheva

==== Stone ====
His first work in stone was a male torso carved from marl, created while he was a student in 1955.
Koblasa returned to sculpting in stone nearly twenty years later, as a professor in Kiel and the winner of public competitions for sculptures in public spaces. After creating small-scale sculptures in dolomite (Attempt at a Smile, 1974) and alabaster (Buddha, 1974), he went on to create the monumental marble sculpture Buddha (1976) for a park in Kiel. At the sculpture symposium in Lübeck (1983), he created the sculptures Arabella (marble) and The Couple, Adam and Eve (dolomite).
Since the early 1980s, he has consistently devoted himself to working with stone as an educator (Gottorf Sculpture Symposium, 1982; Brøby, 1984; the sculpture Inside the Stone, Anröchte, 1986; the sculpture The Messenger, Anröchte, 1987, 1988, 1989; the sculpture Guardian, sandstone), as well as during summer residencies in Carrara (1984, 1985; the sculpture Nike, Elmshorn) and in Norway (Good News, 1985, diabase, Flensburg; The Big Step—Balance, 1988–1998, granite, 4.5 m, Kiel).

In early 1989, he worked in Eilat on the monumental Guardians (travertine and marble, 5 m), and that same year, at a sculpture symposium in Neumünster (1988), he created the sculptures David and Goliath (diabase, 230 cm). In September and October 1989, in Anröchte, he created three sculptures for Swisttal (Day and Night Watch, 2.5 m) as well as an obelisk and seven sculptures for the employment office in Kiel. The frontal design of these austerely conceived, monumental stone blocks evokes the legacy of ancient civilizations. Koblasa's sculptures embody both the projection of the human spirit into the "soul of stone" and the symbolic significance of stone — its permanence, its iconic status, and the memory of the natural processes that shaped it.

In 1990, upon his first return from exile, Koblasa participated in the Hořice symposium and created the sandstone sculpture The Great Sacrifice (as a Tribute to Václav Havel).

At the turn of the 1990s, he created the sculptures The Spectator (1998, Verona marble), The Prophet Jeremiah (1999, Anröchte dolomite, 410 cm), and Small Temple (2000, Egyptian granite, 270 cm, Aswan). The monumental The Great Spectator (Slivenec marble) was created at a sculpture symposium in Dobřichovice in 2003; The Great Eagle for Schleswig in 2005; The Five Narrow Gates of Life for Forchheim in 2007; and The Baptismal Font for the church in Ellerau in 2011.

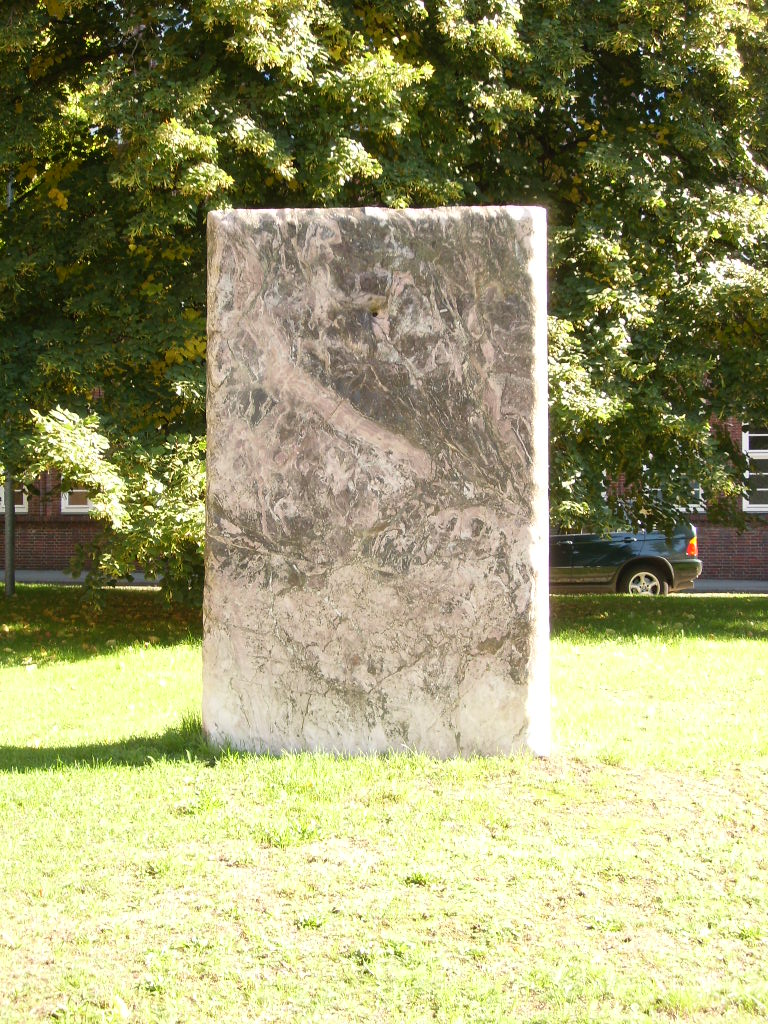
Arabella (1983), Lübeck

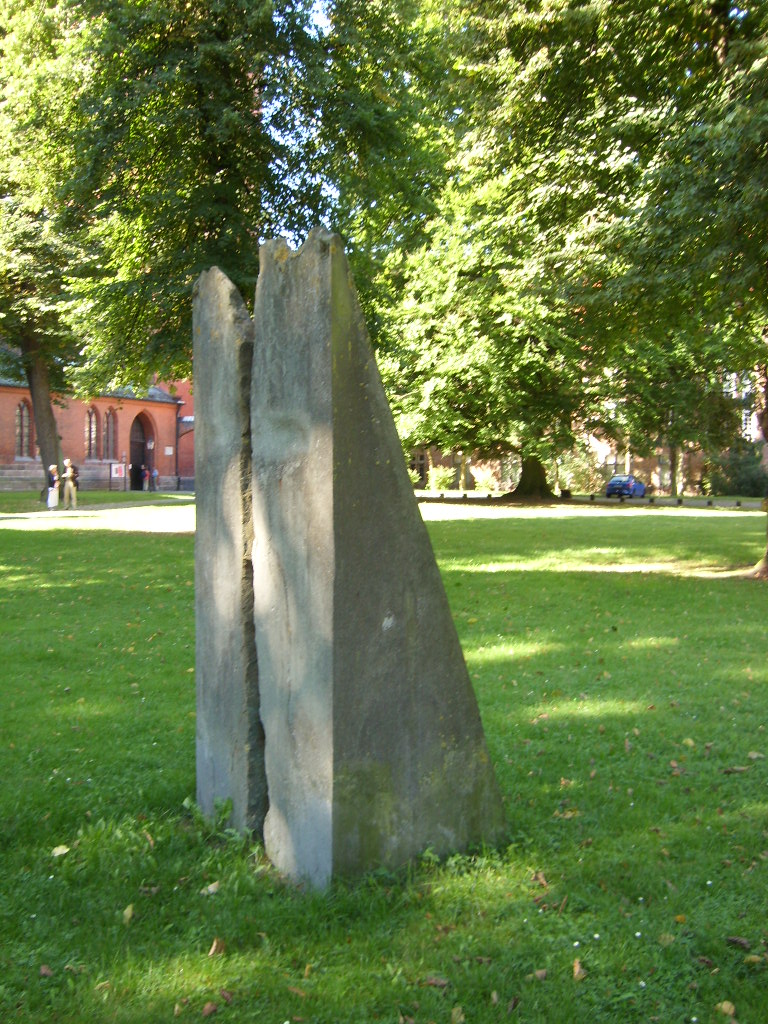
Domtürme (1983)

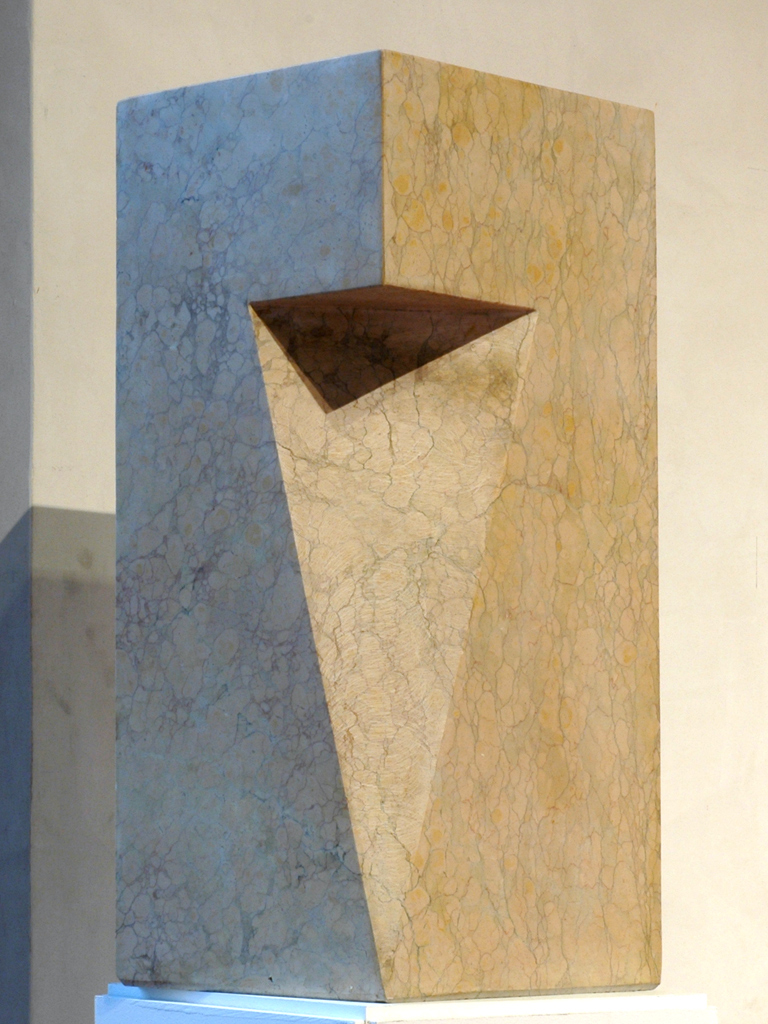
Head (1987)

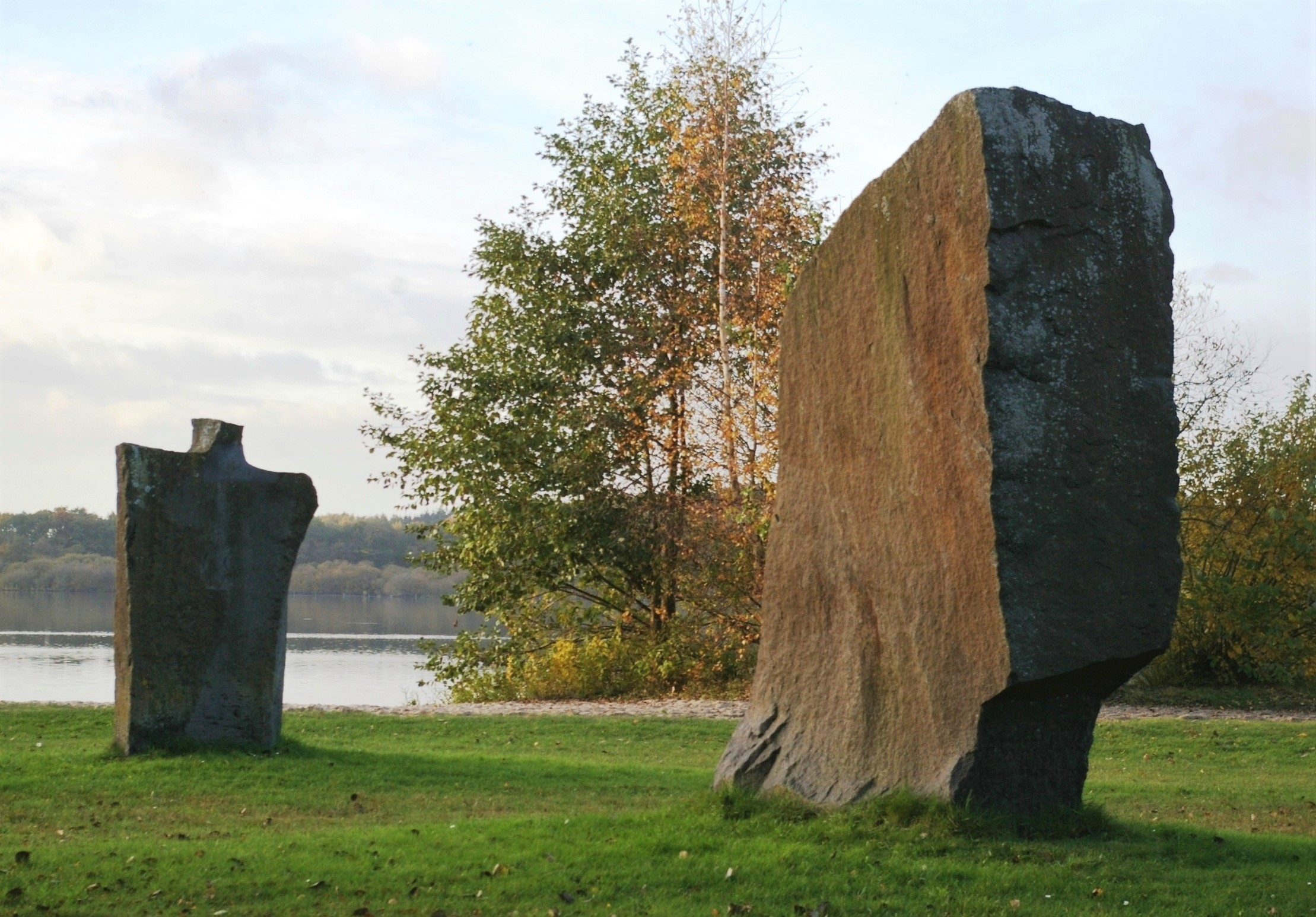
David and Goliath (1989), Neumünster

Column of Life and Seven Days of the Week from Anröchter Sandstein (1989), Jobcenter Kiel

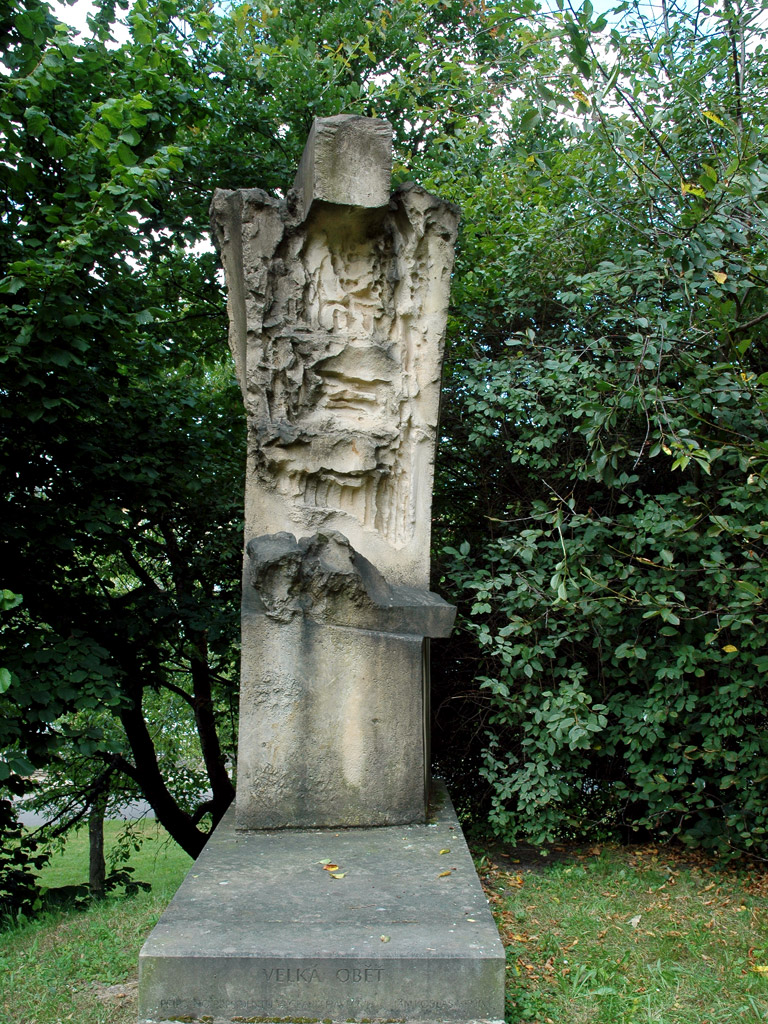
The Great Sacrifice (1990), Hořice

Parze, Cuxhaven (1996)

Rendsburg - Hans-Heinemann-Park

Family (1998), Mikulov

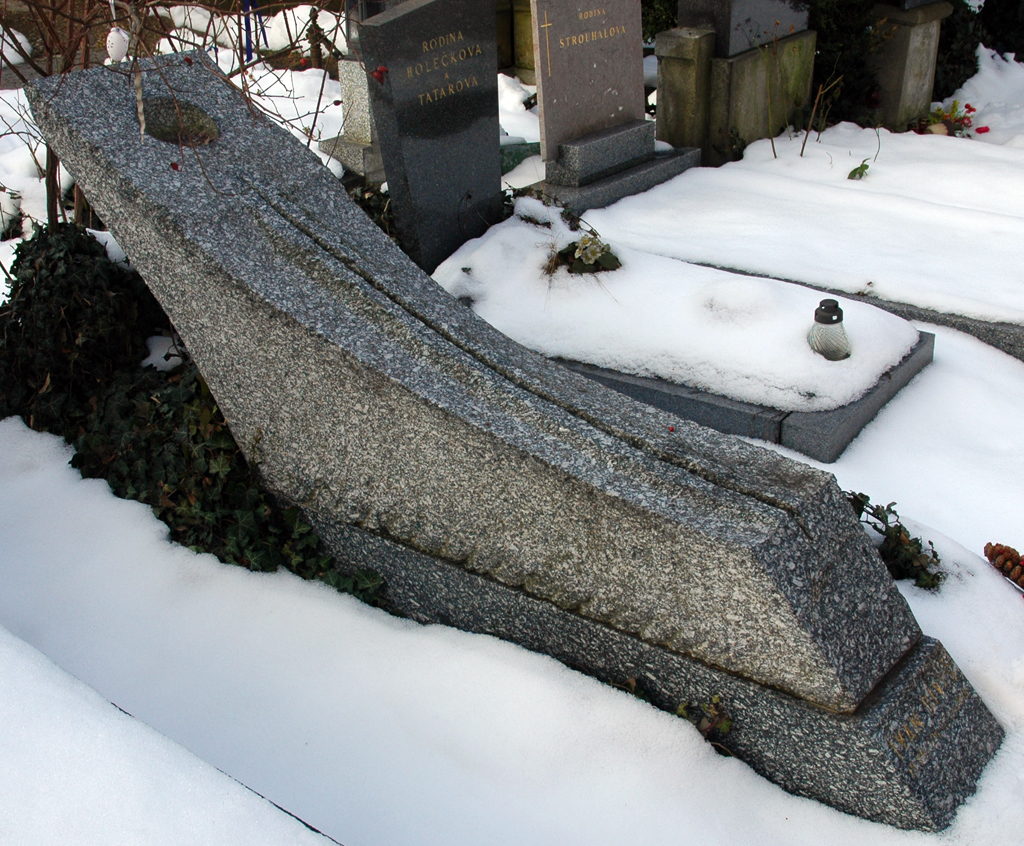
Tombstone of Ivan Diviš (2001)

Call of the Mountain (2002), The Path of Friendship, Bílka

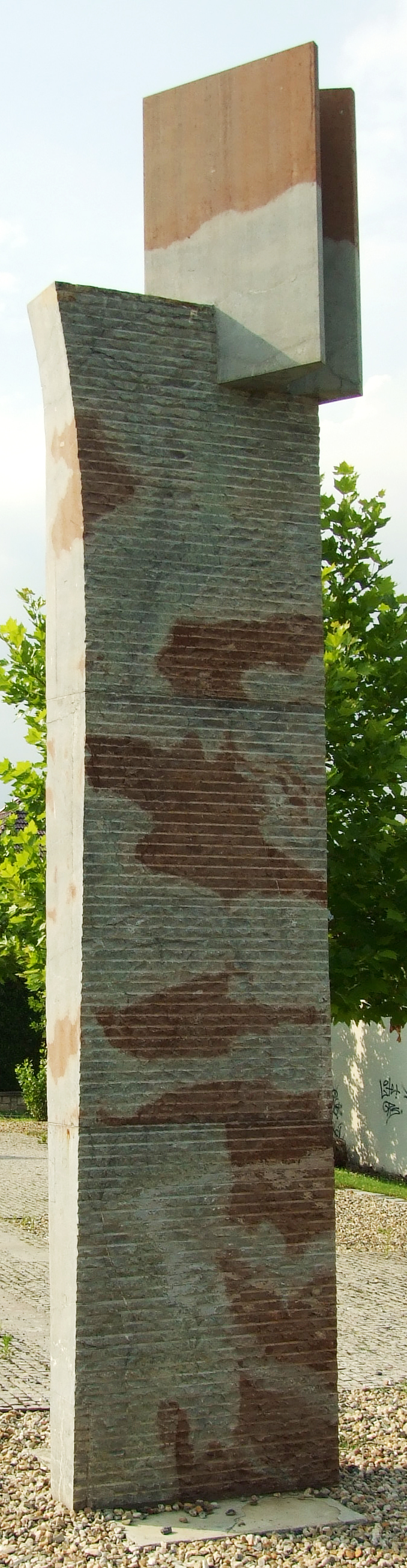
The Great Spectator (2003)

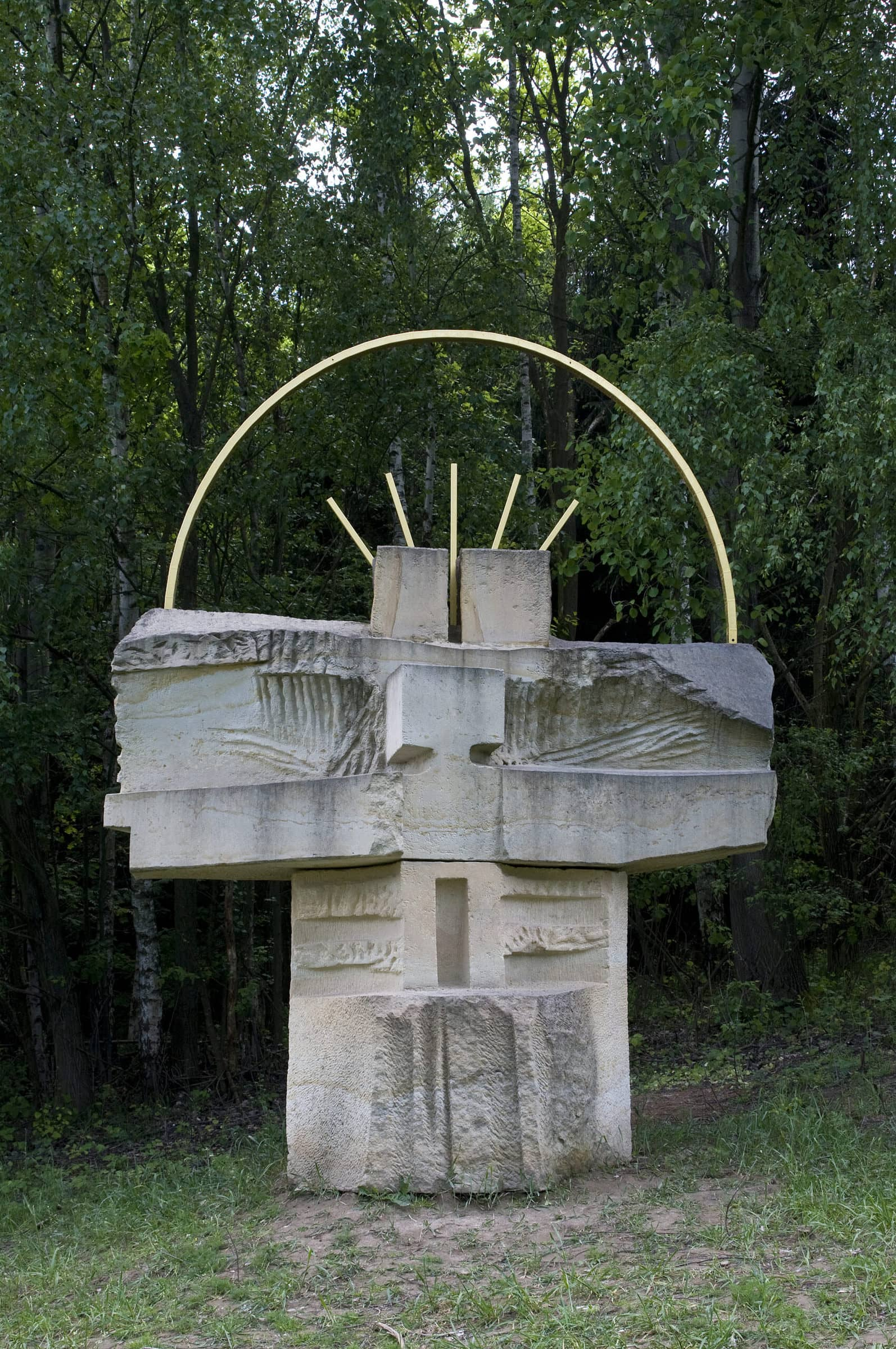
The Holy Family, 2005, Kuks

Der Wächter, Eppendorf

Der Wächter, Hattingen

==== Metal ====
His work with metal began in 1962 with the chance discovery of fragments of old iron, which he transformed into assemblages (Lives of the Martyrs), but in the mid-1960s he began using an electric welder and created several figurative welded sculptures (Head, 1965, Young Man in His Prime, The Great Prophet, Tribute to Ptolemy, 1966). In the striking slenderness of the figures and the delicate tangle of sensitively layered lines, one can find echoes of the drawings for The Apocalypse. He returned to welded sculptures in 1986 (The Angel Messenger) and in 2005 with the series of steel sculptures Templ.

In the 1960s, Koblasa managed to cast some of his school works (Boredom, Portrait of Miss D, The Idiot), including a nude sculpture that was intended to be his graduation project but was rejected for ideological reasons, as well as free-standing sculptures from the late 1950s (Saint Sebastian, 1958; Head, Magdalene 1959).

In 1965, he designed rhodium plated tin candlesticks for the altar of the Church of St. Peter and Paul in Jedovnice. He created several small-scale sculptures for casting in bronze while preparing for an exhibition in Germany in 1968 (Little Angel I–IV, Toad) and a new series, Angels, in the 1990s.

The monumental bronze sculpture Neighbor, located in front of the Registry Office in Kiel, dates from 1972; Corpus, located at Blankeneser Kitche am Markt, Gemeindehaus, Hamburg, dates from 2012.

Since November 17, 2013, his gilded bronze sculpture The Resurrection, which he created in 1981, has been on display in St. Vitus Cathedral at Prague Castle. The 4 m high sculpture has been displayed on the exterior wall of the Church of St. Giles in Nymburk since 2012.

Head (1966)

A Young Man in His Prime, Máňa the Dwarf (1966)

Messenger - Angel, welded metal (1986)

Tempel (1982–1989), Schleswig - Schlossinsel

Heiliger Sebastian (1991), Schleswig - Schlossinsel

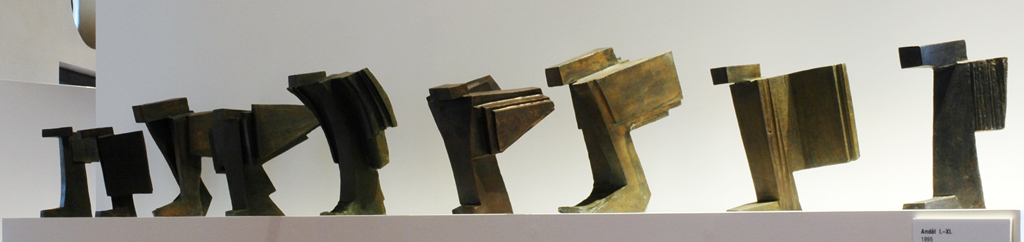
Angels I-IX, bronze (1990s)

Nachbar (Neighbour) Kiel (2015)

==== Combined materials ====
The contrasting use of multiple materials in Koblasa's work conveys hidden messages and reflects extreme situations, as seen, for example, in the series of three-dimensional sculptures made of wood and stone weights placed on a metal edge, titled Balance (1972). The sculptures symbolize a pivotal juncture in life, marked by the delicate balance of opposing forces. The strength of personal grounding, symbolized by a downward-pointing prism clad in lead plates, is counterbalanced by an opposing block of white stone, symbolizing new paths (Balance I). Balance II metaphorically depicts an encounter of one's past with present selves.

He combines metal and wood in the sculptures Great Dependence (1968), Hommage á Mikuláš Medek (1974), Agony (1984), and Mr. Liberty (1993). The combination of wood and stone was used in the Golem series (1981, 1983). The theme of the Golem recurs repeatedly in Koblasa's work, from a print (1972), through a series of succinctly conceived wooden sculptures from the 1980s and sculptures made of fired and glazed fireclay, to harmoniously balanced wooden sculptures with an embedded stone cube serving as a shem (1992).

His sculptures Wheelbarrow — Hommage à Mikuláš Medek and a similar work dedicated to František Muzika, who, like Medek, died in 1974, strike the viewer as somewhat unusual. Wheelbarrow depicts a sort of bier carrying the deceased to the afterlife. The slender, snow-white forms of the sculptures are poetic symbols, an original parable, and a fond remembrance.

Polychrome wood and other natural materials were used in the Actors series (1975–1979), and metal cubes set in stone (diabase-cast iron, granite-iron, as in Heavy Head, 1990, 1991). To emphasize the sacred significance of a symbol, he uses gilding (Reclining, 1987; J. Valenta's tombstone, 2004; Angels, 2010).

Balance, wood, stone, steel (1972)

Balance II, wood, stone, steel (1972)

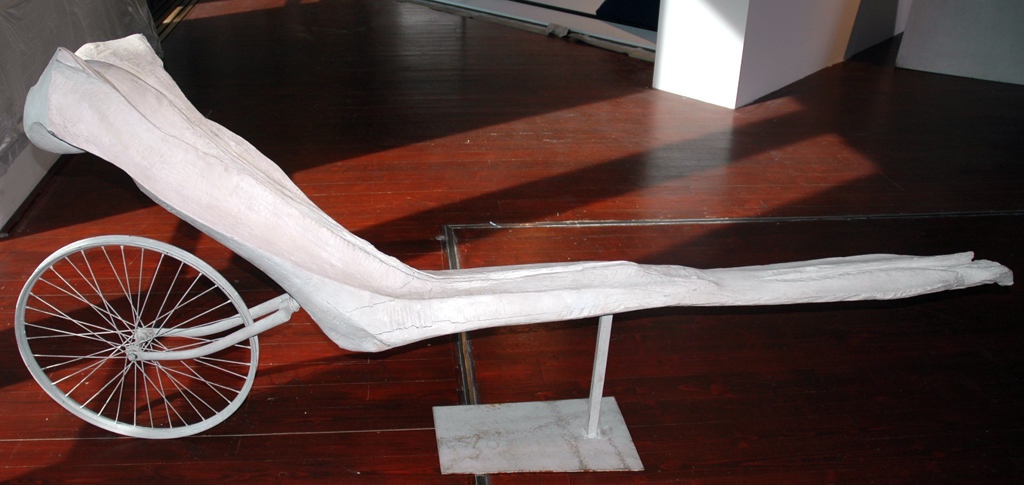
Wheelbarrow - Hommage á Mikuláš Medek, polychrome wood, metal (1974–1975)

Heavy Head, Eppendorf

==== Reliefs and architecture ====
His first relief design—a gate with the theme The Family of Man (1958) was created while he was still a student.

Koblasa's ability to master even monumental spaces was evident in his design for the new interior of the church in Jedovnice (in collaboration with Mikuláš Medek, 1963), which is dominated by Medek's altarpiece and Koblasa's assemblage incorporating fragments of destroyed old altars.

This was followed by the creation of a mosaic for the Czech Airlines building in Košice (1963) and wall made of prefabricated elements in Ostrava (1964). In 1967 Koblasa won the first place in a competition and a commission for a relief covering the entire interior front wall of the new airport building in Ruzyně (4.1 × 45 m). With its emphasized verticality, the relief is a direct reference to the Gothic heritage, while its sensitive modeling is reminiscent of the Czech Radical Baroque.

In 1968, he created designs for reliefs for the Czech Airlines building in Rabat and the embassy in Brasília. Later, in Germany, he had the opportunity to create the relief Sea for the Employment Office in Kiel (1971), relief-adorned entrance doors and columns for the courthouse in Norderstedt (1985), the group of concrete sculptures Dance, and the design for the atrium of the post office with sculptures in Flensburg (1983, 1985), the large sculpture The Crucified in Dietrichsdorf (1981), an altar, a cross, and windows in Lübeck (1991), and a large glazed ceramic cross (5 × 5 m) in Neumünster (1997).

In 1976, he collaborated with architects on a project for a new cemetery in Bremen; in 2000, on a new chapel in Bílka (with architect Ivan Nosek); and from 2004 to 2010, on the sculptures and overall design of Mahler Park in Jihlava.

In Germany: The Prophet Isaiah, Königstraße, Hamburg, 2013 (in collaboration with Sonia Jakuschewa); Two Birds of Paradise, Blankenese Cemetery, Hamburg, 2013.

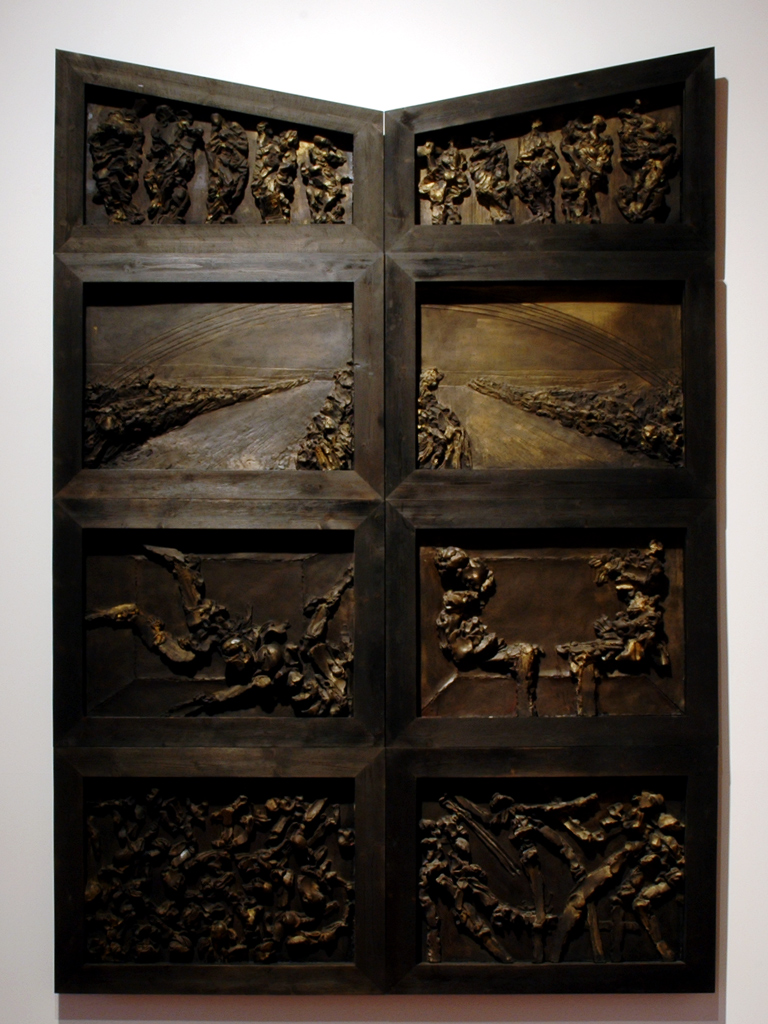
Entrance door, Court building in Norderstedt, wooden frame, bronze (1985)

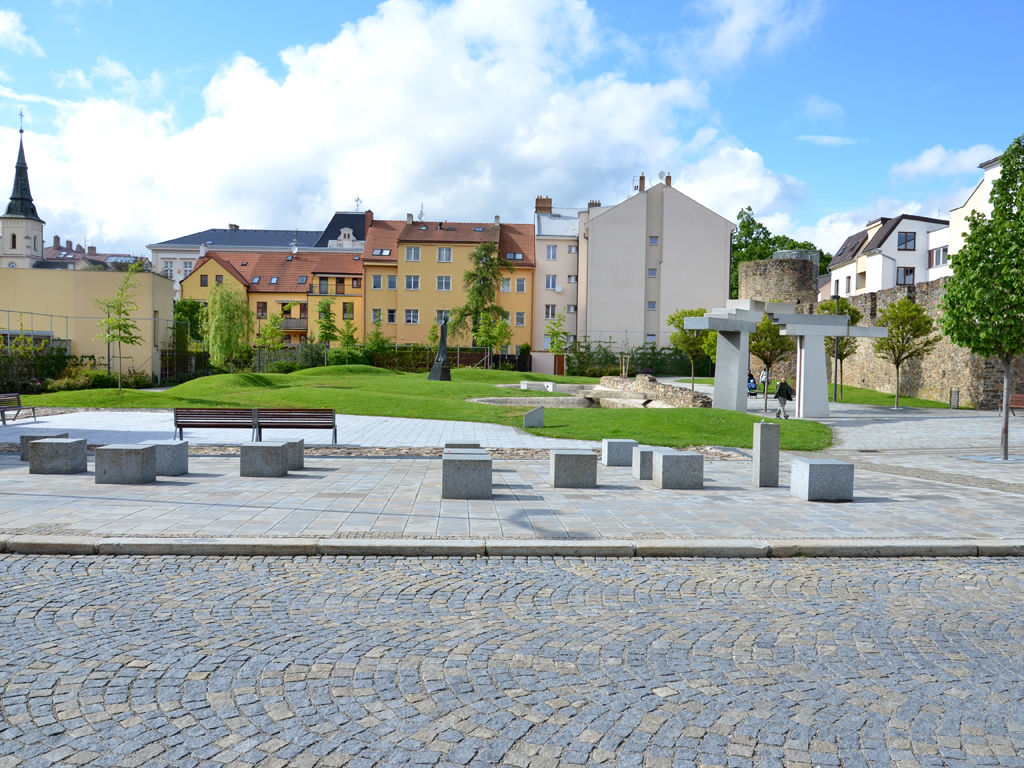
Gustav Mahler park in Jihlava

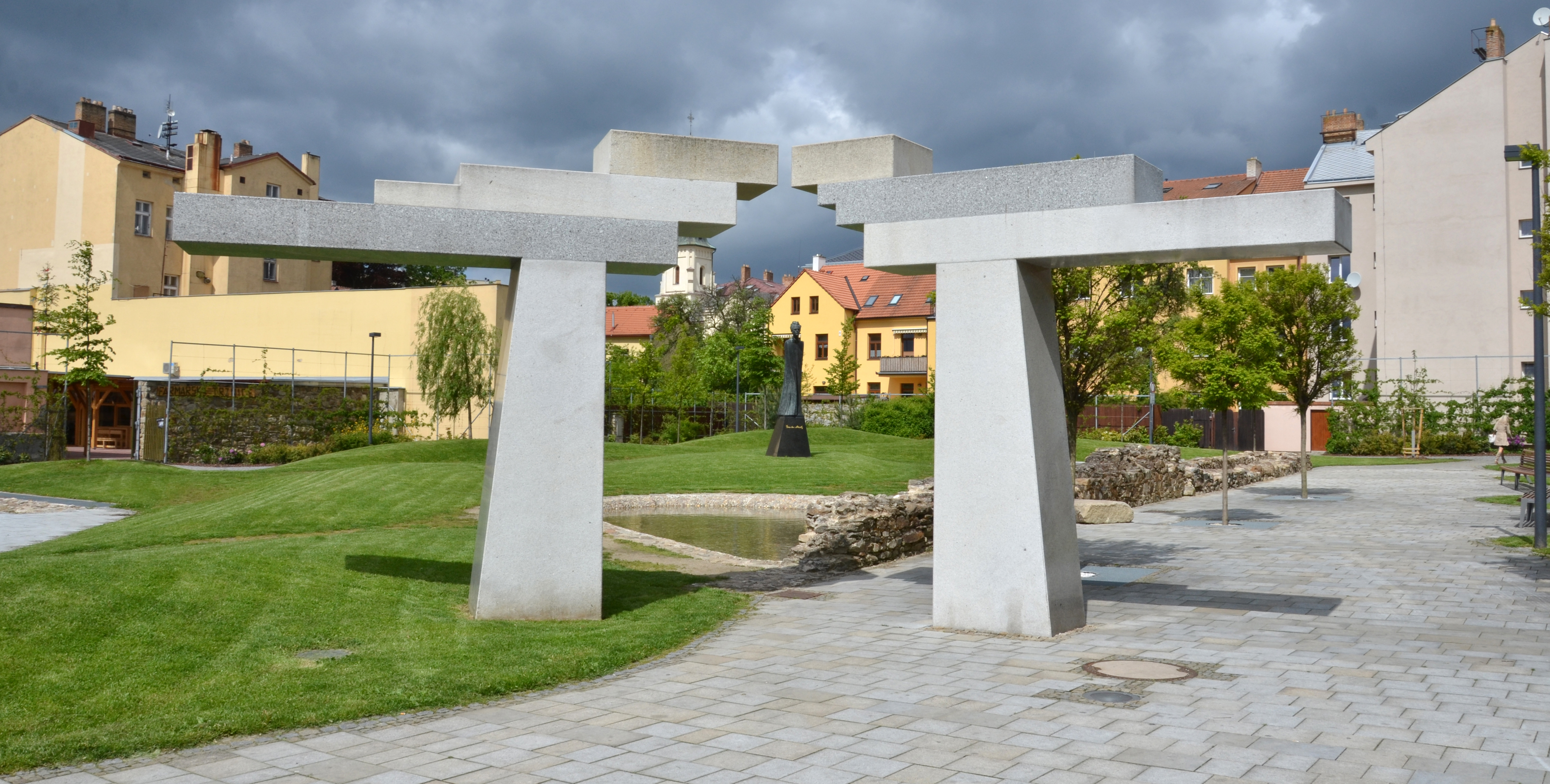
Gustav Mahler park in Jihlava

Gustav Mahler park in Jihlava

Gustav Mahler park in Jihlava

==== Monuments and statues dedicated to friends and parents ====
- 1965 The Aged Comedian (to his father)
- 1968 Requiem (Hommage à Antonín Tomalík)
- 1973 Actor—Devilish Trill (to his father)
- 1974/75 Wheelbarrow (Homage to Mikuláš Medek)
- 1976 Sleep My Prince (Homage to František Muzika)
- 1991 Conversation—Adieu (To Jiří Valenta)
- 1991/92 Dead Mother (inverted Pietà)
- 2001 Tombstone for Ivan Diviš, Břevnov, Prague
- 2004 Tombstone for Jiří Valenta, Břevnov, Prague
- 2004 Tombstone for Milan Kymlička, Toronto

==== Drawings, prints, illustrations, collages ====
Men's Club — Jan Koblasa, Nepraš, Dlouhý (later known as Šmidrové) — developed a distinctive poetic style in their drawings, where humor blended with absurd reality (The Clown's Funeral). In Koblasa's later drawings, the element of humor disappeared (The Sword of Damocles, 1958; drawings for The Apocalypse, 1965). Some of the geometric figures (Diana on the Hunt, Reclining Woman) were also rendered in three dimensions (wire, plaster) and painted.

Koblasa was introduced to graphic techniques at the Academy by his classmate Jaroslav Kadlec and later also to lithography by Josef Istler. His first prints were woodcuts (Tied-Up Dog, 1956) and drypoint engravings (until 1958). With the transition to abstraction, he first created a series of tachist monotypes (Abel and Cain, The Labyrinth of the World, 1958), followed later by several series of informel prints such as line etchings, sometimes combined with aquatint (Fundamentals of Geometry, 1959; Fundamentals of Surveying, 1961). The title of the graphic series Fundamentals of Surveying refers directly to a work by Franz Kafka, just as the series of paintings K (1959) does. The monotypes Diagram of My Brain (1962) are an expression of existential feelings and their innermost revelations. They are closely related to the "psychic texture" of the paintings by Mikuláš Medek.

Based on preparatory drawings, he printed 23 sheets on the theme of the Apocalypse (etching with aquatint) in 1966–68. His interest in the Apocalypse was sparked by a lecture and an essay by Jaroslav Chadraba, as well as Bergman's film The Seventh Seal. This text, which has inspired the imagination of artists for centuries, served as a basis for Koblasa to depict contemporary fears as well as visions of destruction and creation. The stylization of mythical stories into symbolically conceived narrative plot summary (in the manner of William Blake) takes the form of a unified central composition with striking accents.

The drawings and silkscreen prints Old Women, the lithograph Jonah and the Whale, and the print commemorating Jan Palach's sacrifice (Young Man in Flames) were created in 1969 in Florencefollowed by the drawings and silkscreen prints Old Women (1969). The lithographs Jonah and the Whale were created in Florence in 1969.

Figurative motifs continue in the Heads series (1969–74, 1980) and, in particular, in the extensive series of etchings (Sabbath, Witches, Intimacy, The Little and Great Passions, etc.) and silkscreen prints (Sticking Out the Tongue, Dance of Death) from 1972. Christian themes recur regularly in Koblasa's work (the color etchings Pieta, 1989, and The Last Supper, 1989).

Koblasa returned to printmaking with themes that could not be realized in sculpture (Lament, 1976; Jogging, 1978; One, Two, Fly, 1986), but also in parallel with his sculptural work (Mountains, 1974/80; Pietà, 1980).

During his stay in Vence (1975), he produced two hundred ink drawings. The series of color drawings Hangover, The Annunciation, and Struggle with the Angel date from 1977.

During his stays in United States, he created drawings on the theme of Ubu Roi and an extensive series of mixed-media works, The Making of Americans (Hommage à Gertrude Stein, 1978) and Jeremiah's Prophecy (1979). Textual elements reappear in the series of drawings Diaries (1999/2000). In the 1980s, he painted a series of color drawings titled Cherchez la femme (1987–1988). Koblasa found inner harmony and transcendence in Eastern religions (Buddha, 1974–1975) and especially during his stays in the mountains, which he depicted in drawings and prints (Mountains, 1969–1974)

In 1989, he created the monumental four-part color etching Last Supper (64 × 198 cm), and in 1995, alongside his bronze sculptures, he produced the color etchings Angels.

Illustrations form a separate part of his graphic work (Máj, 1995; Gilgamesh, 2002; From the Life of a Poet, 2007; Shakespeare's sonnets, 2008). The Epic of Gilgamesh was also one of the inspirations for the series of drawings and color etchings titled Wind from 2002; the series Flood (2003) was created under the influence of the disaster that struck Prague in 2002. By rotating the original plate and making multiple prints from it, Koblas succeeded in evoking a sense of movement, impermanence, transience, and turbulence.

The series of figurative collages Panatomie, made from torn drawings on paper, was created in 1963; the collage combined with drawing Melancholy—Shit in the Head was created in 1992.

Since late 2003, Koblasa has also been working in computer graphics.

==== Paintings ====
After acquiring his first studio in 1958, with the intention of breaking away from the conventions of academic realist sculpture, Koblasa painted intensively (The Garden of Delights, 1959; Me and Lolita, 1960) and quickly moved toward abstraction and structural painting centered on the theme of sacrifice (The Dead Man, 1960, Veronica's Veil, 1961) and existential anxiety (Noli tangere circulos meos, 1960; Finis terrae, 1961; What Is Below Is Also Above, 1961). He constructs a painting as an autonomous object that emerges from the interplay of materialized psychological states and a rationally composed form. He is one of the founders of Czech Informel. This cycle of abstract paintings culminates in the large-scale canvases titled Transcendence (1961). The paintings titled What is above is below illustrate the internal logic of Koblasa's work, which is based on a reversible analogy (which, in a horizontal sense, can be expanded to read "what was at the beginning will also be at the end").

In the mid-1960s, stylized figuration appeared in Koblasa's paintings, most often reflecting private themes (Emotional Life, 1965).
While in exile, he did not return to painting until the late 1970s, during a period of personal crisis and when he was unable to work in his sculpture studio (Dance, Fallen Angels, 1977; Mein Schatz hat grün so gern, 1980).

Koblasa experiments with artistic techniques and often explores the themes of the Earth (Horizons, 1998) and the elements (Wind, 2001) in his series of paintings.

In 2008, he created the paintings Conversation with the Devil, Dogs and Rabbits.

Noli tangere (1960)

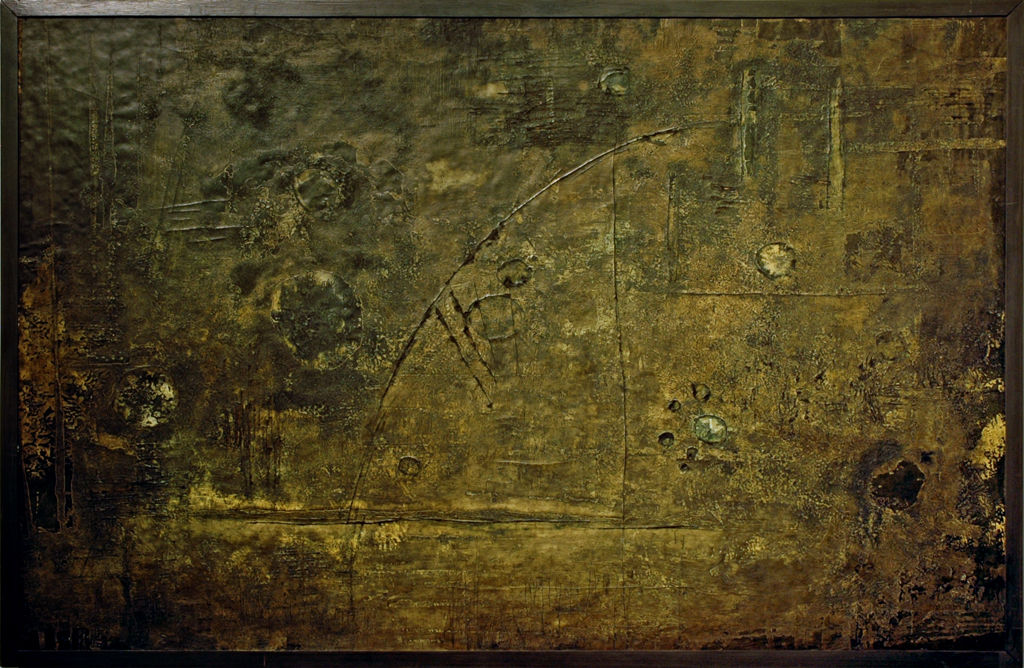
Noli tangere circulos meos III (1960)

What's above is below (1960)

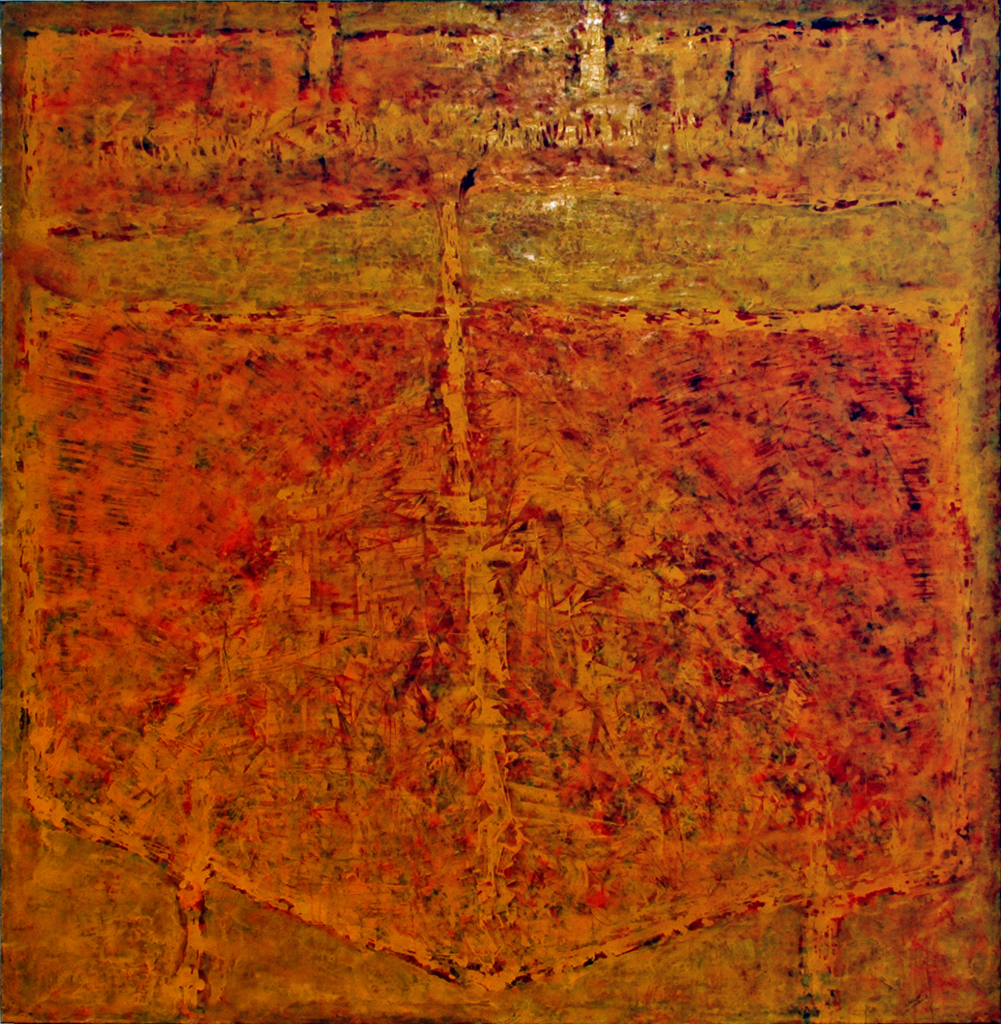
The Red-Haired Little Man (1960)

Finis terrae II (1961)

Double transcendence (1961)

Transcendence III (1961)

Veronica's Veil (1961)

Dead Man (1964)

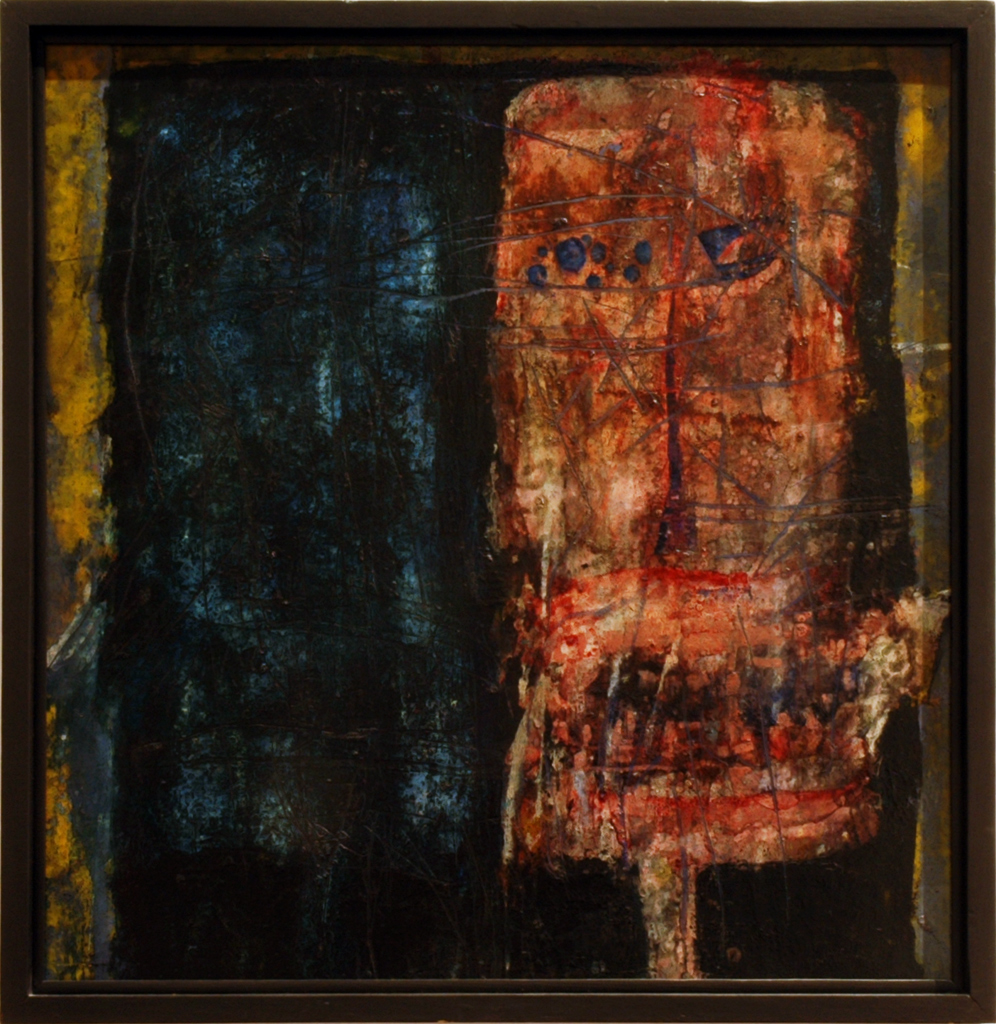
The Fake Soprano (1965)

Emotional Life (1966)

=== Theatre and cinema ===
==== Scenography, masks and costumes ====
- 1964 The End of Shrovetide (masks), Josef Topol, r. O. Krejča, National Theatre
- 1965 Maškary z Ostende (Masques ostendais) (masks), Michel de Ghelderode, r. O. Krejča, Divadlo za branou, Prague
- 1969 Lorenzaccio (200 costumes and masks, property), Alfred de Musset, r. O. Krejča, Divadlo za branou, Prague
- 1970 Antigona, Oedipus Rex (masks, costumes), Sofokles, r. O. Krejča, ivadlo za branou, Prague
- 1971 Faust (masks, costumes), Johann Wolfgang von Goethe, r. O. Krejča, Rezidenztheater Munich (not implemented)
- 1971 Scontri generali (masks), r. Giuliano Scabia, Venice
- 1979 Lorenzaccio (scene, costumes, masks), Alfred de Musset, r. O. Krejča, Avignon
- 1979 Tři sestry / Three sisters, Anton Chekhov, r. O. Krejča, Belgium
- 1985 Romeo and Juliet, ballet by Sergei Prokofiev (scene, costumes), Kiel (ballet Vienna)
- 1986 Canticle of the Sun – According to St. Francis, summer scene Preetz
- 1989 Villon (decor and costumes), r. Jaroslav Gillar, Hamburg
- 1990 La dama duende, (costumes), Pedro Calderón de la Barca, r. Jaroslav Gillar

==== Films ====
- 1960 The White Dove, r. F. Vláčil, sculptor – artistic collaboration
- 1967 Marketa Lazarová, r. F. Vláčil, sculptor – artistic collaboration

=== Literary work ===
During his studies at the Academy of Fine Arts in Prague, Koblasa wrote several librettos for ballets (Leda with a Saxophone, 1955), librettos for operas based on works by Borchert (1958) and Kafka, and cycles of verses set to music by Jan Bedřich (Silent loving, 1953) and Jan Klusák (Honza's wandering, 1955).

==== Librettos ====
- 1953 Tiché milování / Silent loving (song cycle), Jan Bedřich
- 1955 Leda with a Saxophone (ballet)
- 1955 Královy nové šaty / The Emperor's New Clothes (ballet), Jan Bedřich
- 1956 Honzovy toulky / Honza's Wanderings (Children choirs), Jan Klusák
- 1956 Panatomic ballet
- 1957/58 Za dveřmi / Behind doors, Wolfgang Borchert, opera, Rudolf Komorous
- 1958 Slečna anděl / Miss Angel (ballet), Rudolf Komorous
- 1958 Lovecké rondeau / Hunting Rondeau (ballet), Rudolf Komorous

==== Diaries and poetry ====
- Jan Koblasa, Záznamy z let padesátých a šedesátých / Records from the 1950s and 1960s, diary and poetry, Vetus Via, Brno 2002, ISBN 80-86118-70-3
- Jan Koblasa, O tom / About It, Edice současné české poezie / A Series of Contemporary Czech Poetry, J. Drda Library 2006, ISBN 80-86937-12-7
- Jan Koblasa, Emigrace. Vstávání z mrtvých se živým nedaří / Emigration. The living cannot rise from the dead, diary, Ztichlá klika Gallery, Prague 2011, ISBN 9788090389878
- Jan Koblasa, Konec exilu / The end of exile, diary, Ztichlá klika Gallery, Prague 2014, ISBN 978-80-904641-6-2

=== Representation in collections (selection) ===
- National Gallery Prague
- Moravian Gallery in Brno
- Philadelphia Museum of Art
- Institute of Contemporary Art (Miami)
- Stedelijk Museum Amsterdam
- Hamburger Kunsthalle
- Kunsthalle Kiel
- Kunsthalle Nürnberg
- Museum Bochum
- Stiftung Schleswig-Holsteinische Landesmuseen
- Trondheim Art Museum
- Museo d'Arte Moderna, Legnano
- Prague City Gallery
- Czech Museum of Fine Arts, Prague (now Gallery of the Central Bohemian Region)
- North Bohemian Gallery of Fine Arts in Litoměřice
- Gallery of Modern Art, Roudnice nad Labem
- West Bohemian Gallery in Plzeň
- Museum of Art Olomouc
- Aleš South Bohemian Gallery Hluboká nad Vltavou
- Egon Schiele Art Centrum
- Gallery of Modern Art, Hradec Králové
- Gallery of Fine Arts in Ostrava
- Gallery of Fine Arts in Cheb
- Regional Gallery of Fine Arts in Zlín
- Regional Museum, Teplice
- Regional Gallery in Liberec
- Regional Gallery of Highlands in Jihlava
- Terezín Memorial
- Ztichlá klika Gallery, Prague

== Sources ==
=== Catalogues (selection) ===
- Katalog k výstavě prací Jana Koblasy z let 1958–1965 / Catalog for the exhibition of works by Jan Koblasa from 1958 to 1965, Filsak K et al., 2+6 p., Galerie Československý spisovatel, Prague
- Jan Koblasa: Skulpturen - Bilder – Zeichnungen, Koblasa J, Leo P, 36 p., Städtische Kunstgalerie, Bochum 1966
- Moderne Kunst aus Prag (Boudnik, Istler, Koblasa, Medek, Sekal, Sklenar, Valenta), text Hartmann, A, ; Mráz, B, 1967, Kunstverein Celle 1967
- Disegni teatrali di Jan Koblasa, Venice Biennale 1971
- Jan Koblasa: Apocalypsis, Motte M, 54 p., Verlag Christoph Dürr, Munich 1974
- Jan Koblasa 1966–1976, Jensen J.Ch et al., 84 p., Museum Bochum 1976, ISBN 3-8093-0026-8
- Jan Koblasa: Plastiken 1976–1980, Galerie Christoph Dürr, Munich 1980
- Jan Koblasa, Freitag E et al., 284 p., Galerie Marianne Hennemann, Bonn 1981, ISBN 3-88482-026-5
- A l'ouest de Prague: Cinq artistes contemporains, Gassiot-Talabot Gérald, 66 p., Brussels 1987
- Jan Koblasa: Skulptur 1979–1989, Gülzow H et al., 128 p., SFL Schleswig 1989
- Jan Koblasa: Sochy = Skulpturen, Gruša J, 86 p., Praha, Pražský hrad, Belveder, Hamburg, Kampnagelfabrik 1991
- Jan Koblasa, cat., text Wittlich, P; Hájková, L.; Kříž, J.; Kuklík, K, AVČR Prague, 2021 ISBN 80-85194-25-2
- Jan Koblasa: Arbeiten auf Papier, Klimešová M et al., 130 p., de., Bochum 1993, ISBN 3-8093-0171-X
- Jan Koblasa: Skulpturen, Diviš I et al., 1994, 207 p., Lübeck 1994
- Jan Koblasa: Apokalypse, Hlaváčková M, 27 double-sheets, GMU Roudnice nad Labem 1997, ISBN 80-85053-20-9
- Jan Koblasa: Sculptures, Koblasa J, Liška P, 32 p., J.J. Kyncl, Chicago 1999
- Jan Koblasa: Dialogy s hmotou ... / Dialogue with matter..., Seifert A, 76 p., OGV Jihlava 2006, ISBN 80-86250-13-X
- Jan Koblasa: Skulpturen aus sechs Jahrzehnten, Drees J (ed.), 96 p., Schleswig 2007
- Jan Koblasa & Sonia Jakuschewa: skrytá poselství = hidden messages, Nešlehová M, SGVU Litoměřice 2016, ISBN 978-80-87784-19-8
- In defiance : the exhibition of Mikuláš Medek and Jan Koblasa in Teplice in 1963, Medek M et al., 151 s., Artefactum 2026, ISBN 978-80-53018-24-1

=== Monographs ===
- Šmidrové, Kříž J, 82 p., Obelisk, Prague 1970
- Šmidrové, Koblasa J, Jirousová V (eds.), 184 p., Fontána, Olomouc 2005, ISBN 80-7336-218-X
- Jan Koblasa, Nešlehová M, introduction Hlaváček J, 292 p., Karolinum, Prague 2002, ISBN 80-246-0356-X
- Jan Koblasa Grafika – hlubotisky / prints - gravure, Nešlehová M, 264 p., Karolinum, Prague 2011, ISBN 978-80-246-1811-1
- Jan Koblasa - retrospective, Wagner R, Linhartová V, 136 p., Prague Castle 2012, ISBN 978-80-86161-51-8
- Jan Koblasa Grafika / Prints, Nešlehová M, 336 p., Karolinum, Prague 2014, ISBN 978-80-246-2521-8
- Jan Koblasa - dílo ve dvou retrospektivách = das Werk in zwei Retrospektiven, Primus Z, 183 p., KANT Praha, Norimberk 2015, ISBN 978-80-7437-160-8
- Jan Koblasa – Monumentální miniatury / Monumental Miniatures, (sochy z let 1974–2015 / sculptures from 1974 to 2015), 50 p., Galerie ART Chrudim 2015, ISBN 978-80-905740-2-1

=== Encyclopedias ===
- Fernand Hazan (ed.), Nouveau dictionnaire de la sculpture moderne, Paris 1970, p. 154
- Encyklopedický slovník / Encyclopedic dictionary, 1253 p., Odeon Prague 1993, ISBN 80-207-0438-8
- Anděla Horová (ed.), Nová encyklopedie českého výtvarného umění / Nová encyklopedie českého výtvarného umění (A-M), Academia, Prague 1995, ISBN 80-200-0521-8
- Petr Meissner (ed.), Český biografický slovník XX. století / Czech Biographical Lexicon of the 20th Century (vol. II, K-P), 656 p., Paseka publishing house, Prague 1999, ISBN 80-7185-246-5
- Petr Pavliňák (ed.), Slovník českých a slovenských výtvarných umělců / Dictionary of Czech and Slovak Visual Artists V., pp. 262–263, Chagall Art Center, Ostrava 2000, ISBN 978-80-86171-29-6
- Lubomír Slavíček (ed.), Slovník historiků umění, výtvarných kritiků, teoretiků a publicistů v českých zemích a jejich spolupracovníků z příbuzných oborů (asi 1800–2008) / A Dictionary of Art Historians, Art Critics, Art Theorists, and Art Journalists in the Czech Lands and Their Colleagues in Related Fields (c. 1800 – 2008), Vol. 2, p. 1611, Academia Praha 2016, ISBN 978-80-200-2094-9

=== TV documents ===
- Gen (Czech TV 1), 2002
- Ještě jsem tady / I am stil there (Czech TV 1, 2006, Czech TV 2, 2010)
- Návrat / Return (2010)
- Artmix Czech TV 2 (2012)
