= Bořislav =

- Municipality
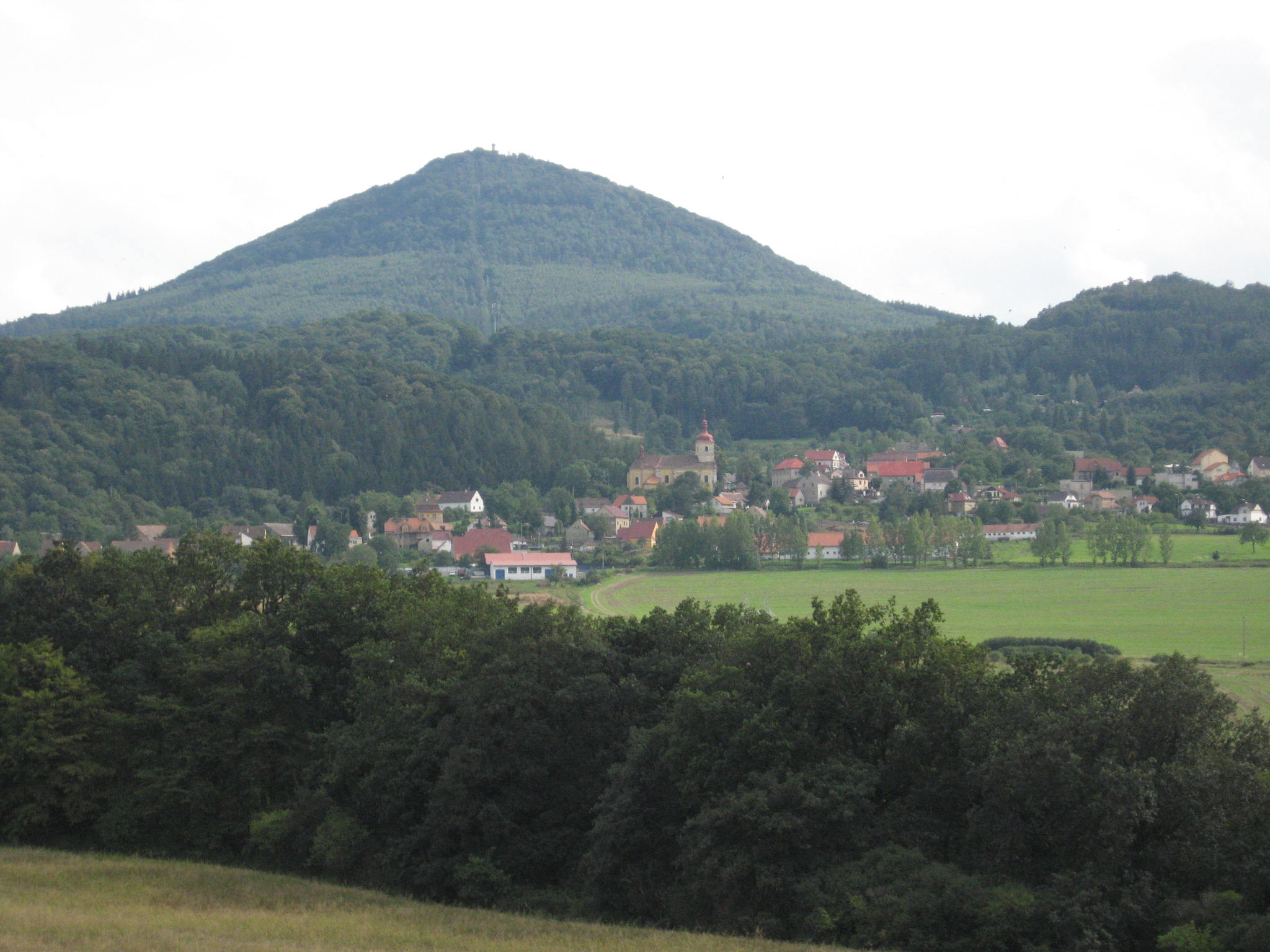
- Bořislav with Milešovka mountain

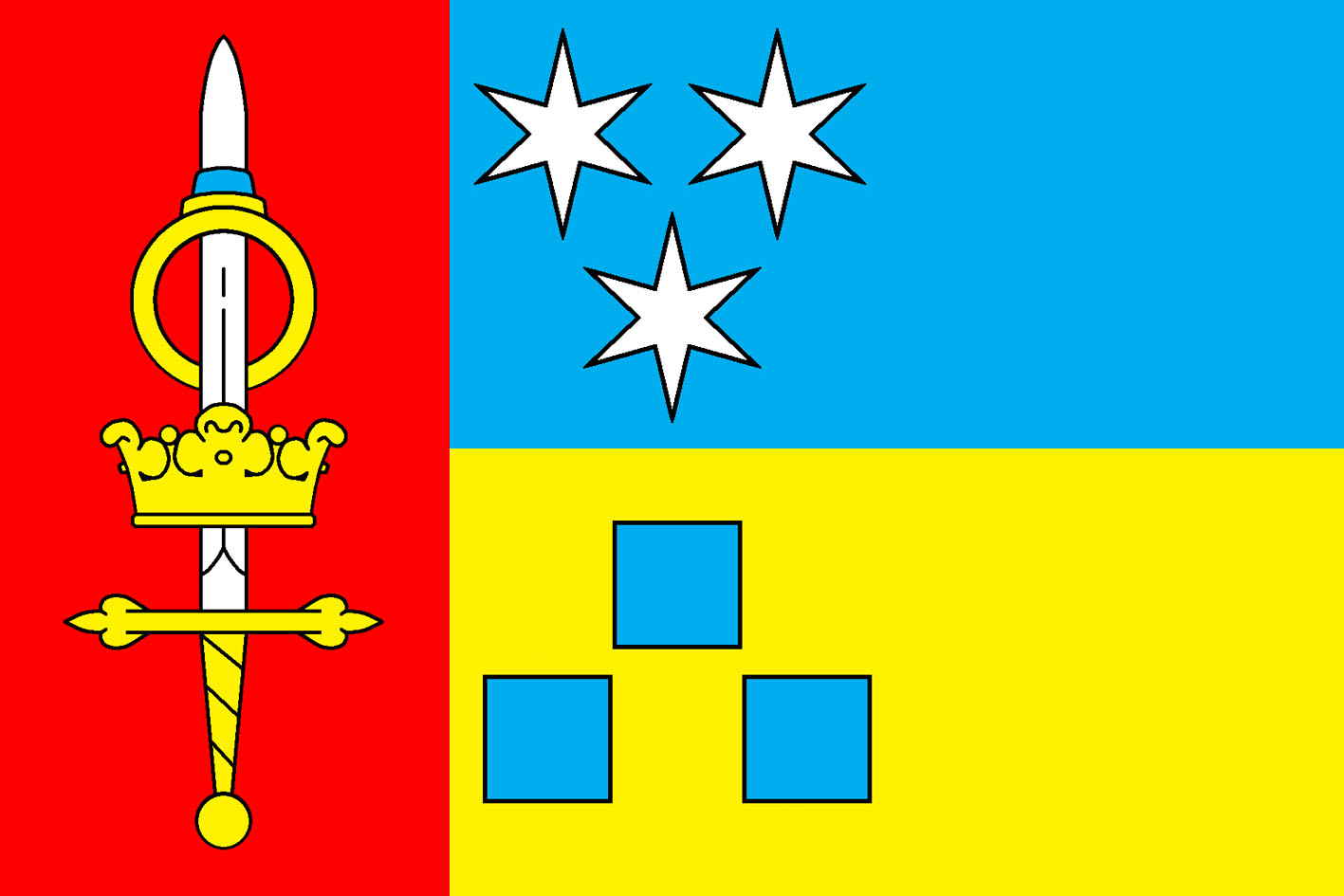
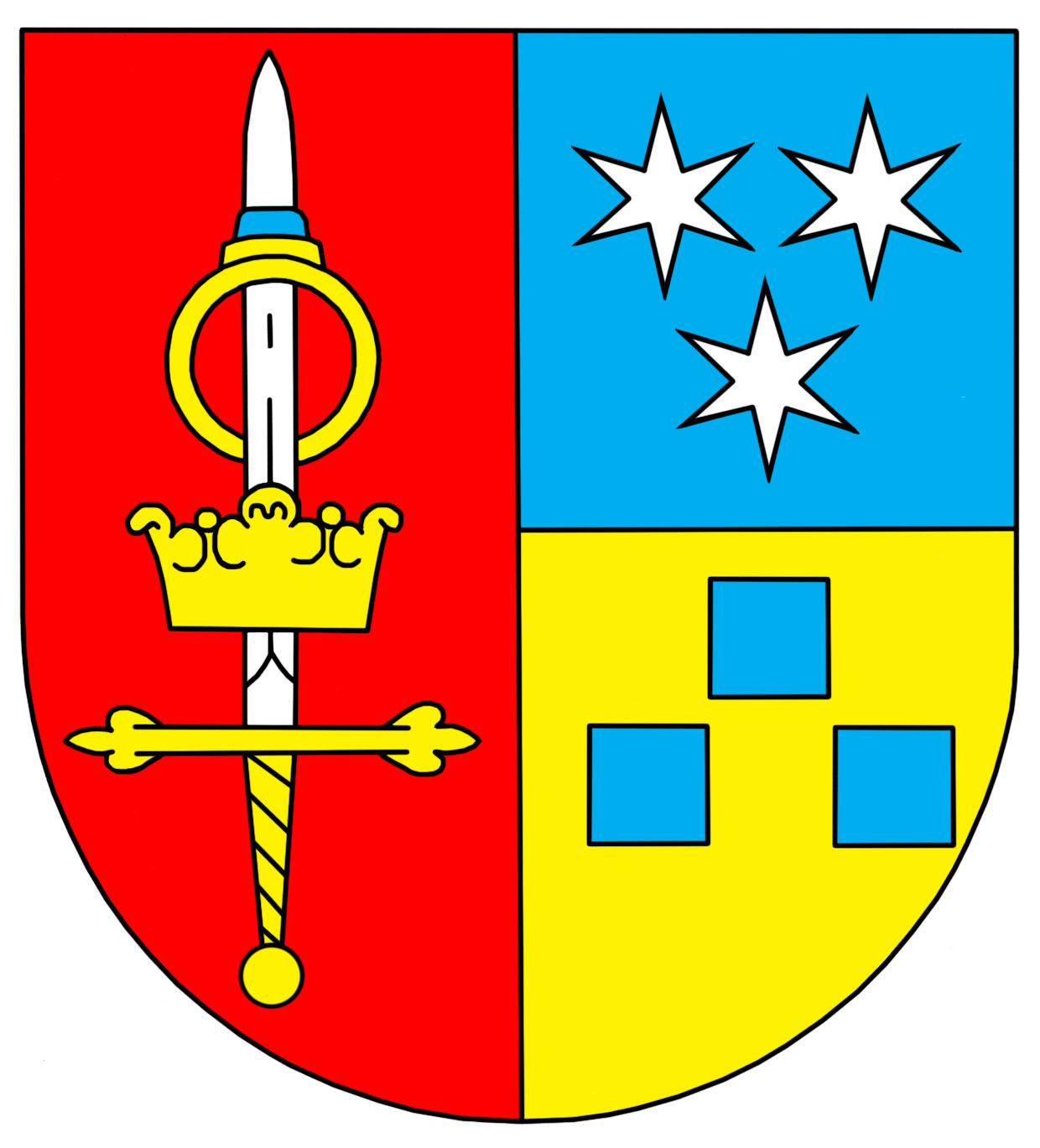
- Flag Coat of arms

- Location in the Czech Republic
- Coordinates: 50°34′46″N 13°55′45″E
- Country: Czech Republic
- Region: Ústí nad Labem
- District: Teplice
- First mentioned: 1169

Area
  - Total: 7.51 km^{2} (2.90 sq mi)
- Elevation: 361 m (1,184 ft)

Population (2026-01-01)
  - Total: 421
  - Density: 56.1/km^{2} (145/sq mi)
- Time zone: UTC+1 (CET)
  - Summer (DST): UTC+2 (CEST)
- Postal code: 415 01
- Website: www.obec-borislav.cz

Bořislav (Czech pronunciation: [ˈbor̝ɪslaf]; German: Boreslau) is a municipality and village in Teplice District in the Ústí nad Labem Region of the Czech Republic. It has about 400 inhabitants.

Bořislav lies approximately 11 kilometres (7 mi) south-east of Teplice, 12 km (7 mi) south-west of Ústí nad Labem, and 65 km (40 mi) north-west of Prague.

== Administrative division ==
Bořislav consists of two municipal parts (in brackets population according to the 2021 census):

- Bořislav (357)
- Bílka (48)

== Demographics ==
Historical population
Year	Pop.	±%
1869	436	—
1880	423	−3.0%
1890	403	−4.7%
1900	380	−5.7%
1910	479	+26.1%
1921	543	+13.4%
1930	661	+21.7%
1950	556	−15.9%
1961	453	−18.5%
1970	414	−8.6%
1980	332	−19.8%
1991	308	−7.2%
2001	297	−3.6%
2011	366	+23.2%
2021	405	+10.7%
Source: Censuses
