= Rudolf Komorous =

Czech-born Canadian composer (born 1931)

Rudolf Komorous (born 8 December 1931, Prague, Czechoslovakia) is a Czech-born Canadian composer. His works include Twenty-Three Poems about Horses (1978), based on the poetry of Li Ho, the opera No no miya (1988) which uses elements of Noh theatre and the Li Ch’ing Chao Madrigals (1985).
