= Fila (disambiguation) =

Fila is a South Korean clothing and consumer good manufacturer founded by Ettore and Giansevero Fila in Italy.

Fila, Fíla or FILA may refer to:

== Businesses and organizations ==
- F.I.L.A. (company), an international supplier of art materials and related products
- Fédération Internationale des Luttes Associées (International Federation of Associated Wrestling Styles), the former name of United World Wrestling

== People ==
- Corentin Fila (born 1988), French actor
- Daniel Fila (born 2002), Czech footballer
- Fila Fuamatu, Samoan powerlifter
- Gary Fila (born 1981), Australian rules football field umpire
- Ivan Fíla, Czech film director
- Karol Fila (born 1998), Polish footballer
- Marek Fila (1959–2023), Slovak mathematician
- Rudolf Fila (1932–2015), Slovak painter and author
- Toma Fila (born 1941), Serbian lawyer and politician

== Places ==
- Fila, an island of Vanuatu
- Fila, Iran, a village in Lorestan Province, Iran

== Other ==
- Fila (hat), a traditional Yoruba cap
- Fila Brazillia, an English electronica duo
- Fila Brasileiro or Brazilian Mastiff, a large working breed of dog developed in Brazil
- Fly International Luxurious Art, a 2015 album by American rapper Raekwon

== See also ==
- Phila (disambiguation)
- Philia Greek Philosophy
- Primera Fila (disambiguation), a Sony Music album series
