= Jiří Valenta =

Jiří Valenta may refer to:

- Jiří Valenta (footballer)
- Jiří Valenta (artist)
