= Jiří Valenta (artist) =

Czech painter (1936–1991)

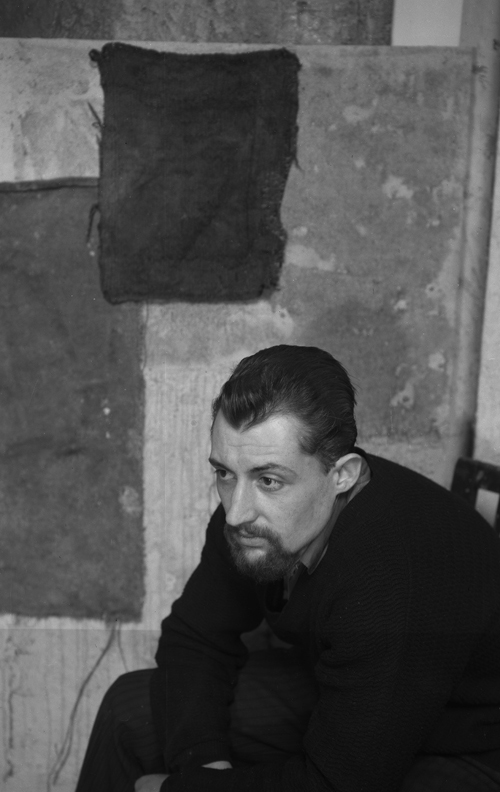
- Jiří Valenta, portrait by Karel Kuklík
- Born: 6 August 1936; Prague, First Czechoslovak Republic
- Died: 11 July 1991 (aged 54); Cologne, Germany
- Education: Academy of Fine Arts, Prague
- Known for: painter, printmaker, photographer

Jiří Valenta (6 August 1936 – 11 July 1991) was a Czech painter, printmaker and photographer. After the Warsaw Pact invasion of Czechoslovakia he emigrated to Germany. From 1972 until his death he lived in Cologne.

== Life ==
From 1951 to 1953, he attended the Higher School of Arts and Crafts in Prague. In his second year he received an exemption as an exceptional talent and at the age of seventeen was admitted to the Academy of Fine Arts in Prague without graduation. From 1953 to 1959, he studied with Miloslav Holý and Karel Souček. His classmates included František Mertl, Milan Ressel and Bedřich Dlouhý. During his studies, he became close to his progressively oriented classmates, who, through two unofficial studio exhibitions called Confrontation, brought the European Informel to the Czech environment in 1960 in a specific form. The group put together by Jan Koblasa included Aleš Veselý, Zbyšek Sion, Zdeněk Beran, Antonín Málek and Antonín Tomalík. The first Confrontation, to which Koblasa invited the printmaker Vladimír Boudník, took place on 16 March 1960 in Valenta's studio Na Palmovce; the second Confrontation, also with Boudník's participation, took place on 30 October in Aleš Veselý's studio in Prague, Žižkov.

In 1963, he had his first solo exhibition of drawings at the Mánes Club, and in 1965 he exhibited his paintings and drawings in Brno. In the same year, he was selected along with five other young European artists for an exhibition at the Lambert Gallery in Paris (Cinque jeunes peintres dÉurope de l'Est). He participated in IV. Biennial at the Musée d'Art Moderne de la Ville de Paris, where the jury deliberately chose Czechoslovak artists who presented a distinct and authentic expression capable of standing up to international competition (J. Valenta, B. Dlouhý, A. Veselý, K. Nepraš, A. Kučerová, R. Fila). In the following years he exhibited at the Mánes Gallery in Prague and Regional Gallery of Highlands in Jihlava and in 1967 he was accepted into the Czechoslovak Art Union. Together with architect M. Hrubý, Valenta prepared the reconstruction of the Chapel of St. John of Nepomuk in the village of Stáj, but after the Warsaw Pact invasion of Czechoslovakia the reconstruction was never realized.

After the Warsaw Pact invasion of Czechoslovakia he went first to Vienna and then to Germany. In 1969, he settled in Hof Dodau near Eutin, in the studio of the Berlin gallerist J. Kilian. From there he moved to Plön, where he learned to make girdles. He exhibited in Toronto, Bochum and Sweden. In 1971, thanks to a one-year scholarship from the Emil Nolde Foundation, he worked in his North German home in Seebull. In 1972, he moved from Plön to Brühl and then to Cologne, where he was employed by the local municipality as a technical draughtsman from 1973 and participated in the preparation of the Cologne city plan. In the 1980s, he travelled extensively (France, England, Italy, Holland, Africa).

At the end of the 1980s, he was diagnosed with a malignant tumour. In 1990 and 1991, he visited Prague and met his mother and friends. He died in Cologne and is buried in the Břevnov Cemetery in Prague.

== Work ==
Valenta's school paintings are dominated by silvery still lifes and grey-green landscapes. The painter's private work expresses the defiance and existential scepticism common to a whole generation of artists studying at the Academy in the 1950s (Ghost of the Slain, 1959). Already during his studies he found a source of inspiration in the art brut of Jean Dubuffet, the material compositions of A. Tàpies or the Burri´s collages made of burlap (Sacchi), but the essence of his work is spiritual and grounded in theoretical considerations.

Early in his career, he touched fleetingly on figuration in paintings that deliberately evoked raw primitive art or children's drawings (Girl with a Ball, 1959, Venus, 1959). In the late 1950s and early 1960s, he turned to structural painting. The relief structure and colour of his paintings, reduced to natural light ochres, sands, creams and greenish tones, were directly inspired by the rocks in the Kokořín valley, where they had taken trips together as students (Collage VIII, 1961). To create a surface of relief, he mixed sand first into the paint and later into the Acronex synthetic resin. Pieces of textile pasted onto the canvas as rectangular and circular fields in the abstract Collage series testify to Valenta's "nostalgia for order" and his need to bring geometric elements to the informel image that would overcome the randomness of structural confusion.

Valenta's artistic expression tended towards contemplation, which also asserted itself through colour, first as a luminous background in the series of paintings Triptych (1959) and later as colourful and luminously opalescent circular centres in the series Portraits of Slowly Increasing Processes (1962-1963). The portraits were Valenta's records of various situations, concrete things or even a conversation. The striated lines of the circular patterns in the surface of the relief paint suggest movement and internal tension, but the imperfect forms and shapes are only phases of an open-ended process. The change in the painting's lava-like texture towards a dull and slightly pinkish synthetic paste is related to the transition to organic structures in the following cycle of Synthetic Tissues (1963-1964), where the formations become isolated as white circles surrounded by a shabby structural painting. Valenta's painterly development has an internal logic from which he does not deviate, even in the mid-1960s, when many of his generational comrades returned to figuration. Valenta continued his cycle of abstract Portraits until his emigration in 1968 (Portrait of a Situation III, 1965, Portrait of a Black Egg, 1965, Portrait of a Blind Young Man (1965-1966), Portrait of the Annunciation, 1966, Small Portrait of a Voice II, 1966–67).

Immediately after his involuntary emigration, during his stay in Dodau (October–November 1968), Valenta created a cycle of nine paintings, Homage to Master Theodoric, subtitled Nine Attempts to Suspend Man in Space. It was a reaction to his departure from the country to which he was tied by his roots and an expression of his personal connection to the leading Czech medieval master, who became for him at that moment an important emotional security and a necessary clue in the vastness of an unknown world. The depressing realisation that he is unable to influence the events, that are taking place outside of him and without his input is expressed in the paintings from 1970 (Votive Plaque for St. Krapp, Votive Plaque for St. Lala, 1970), whose titles refer to Samuel Beckett's absurdist play Krapp's Last Tape. They sketch a space with a central perspective, the indifferent outlines of circular sections suggesting fragments of bodies. The golden metallic surface as a symbol of the divine presence and the rich blue and red colours may suggest an association with medieval paintings.

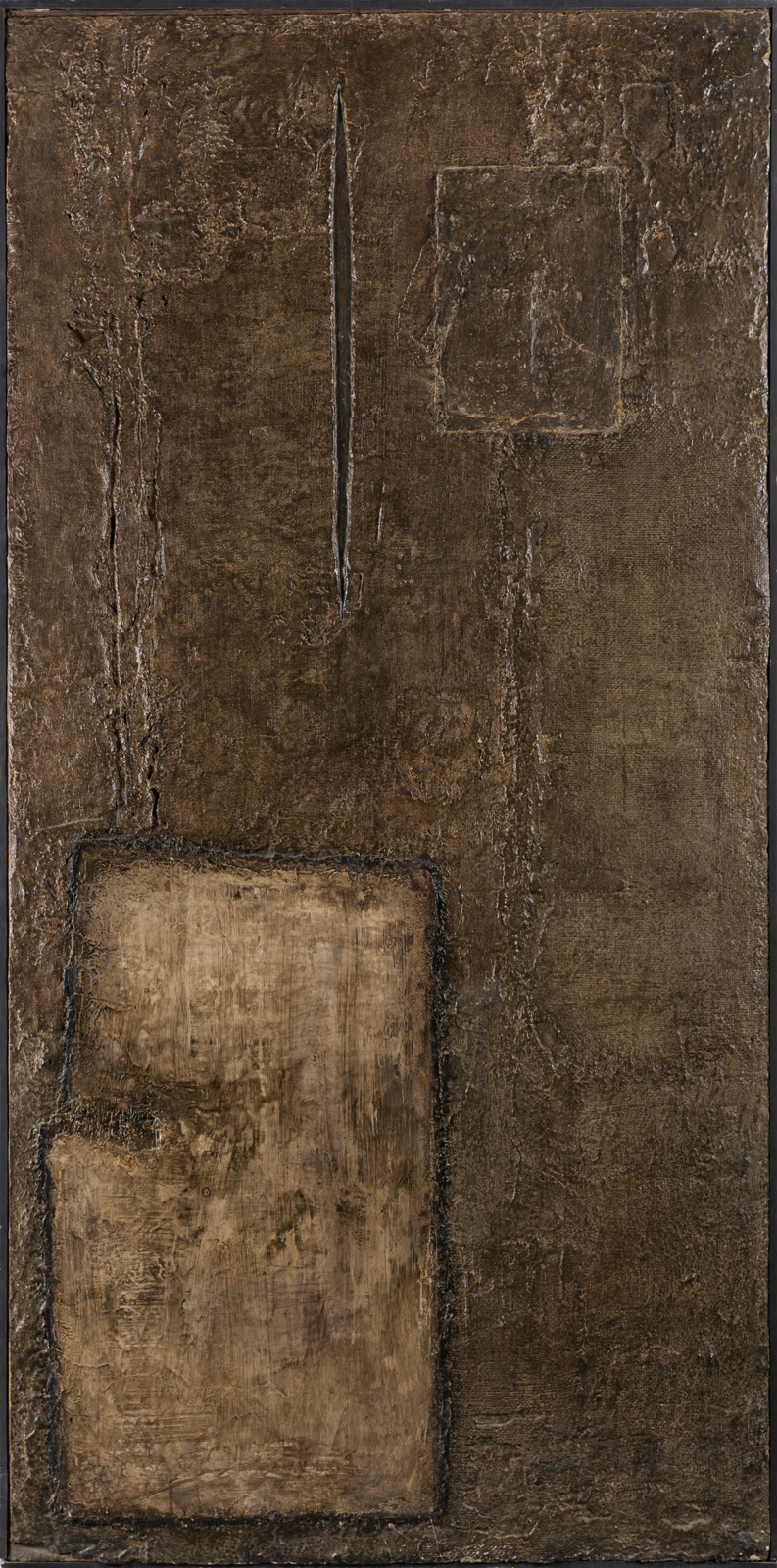
Collage II (1960), Museum Kampa

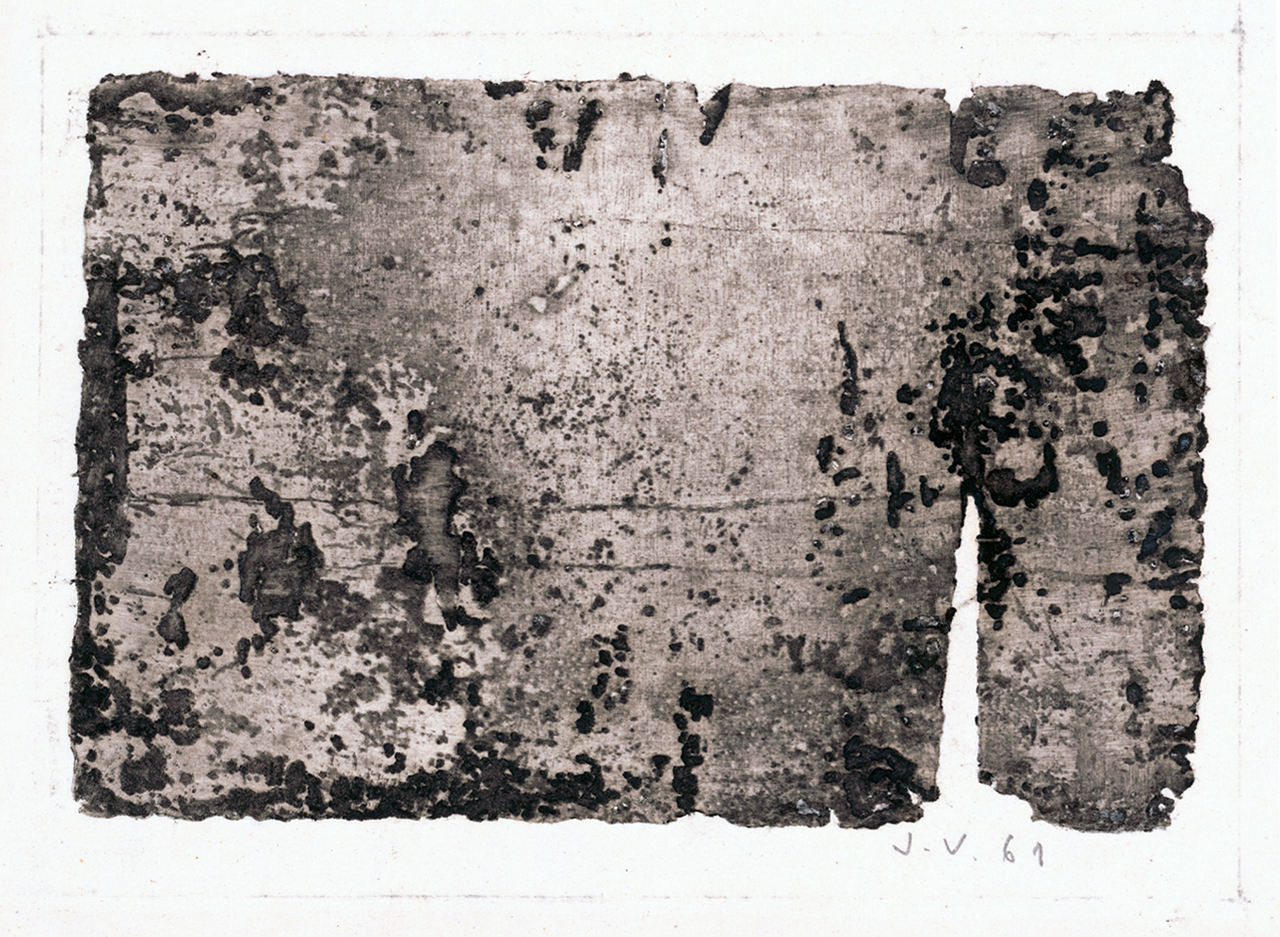
Structural Graphics II (1961), GASK Kutná Hora

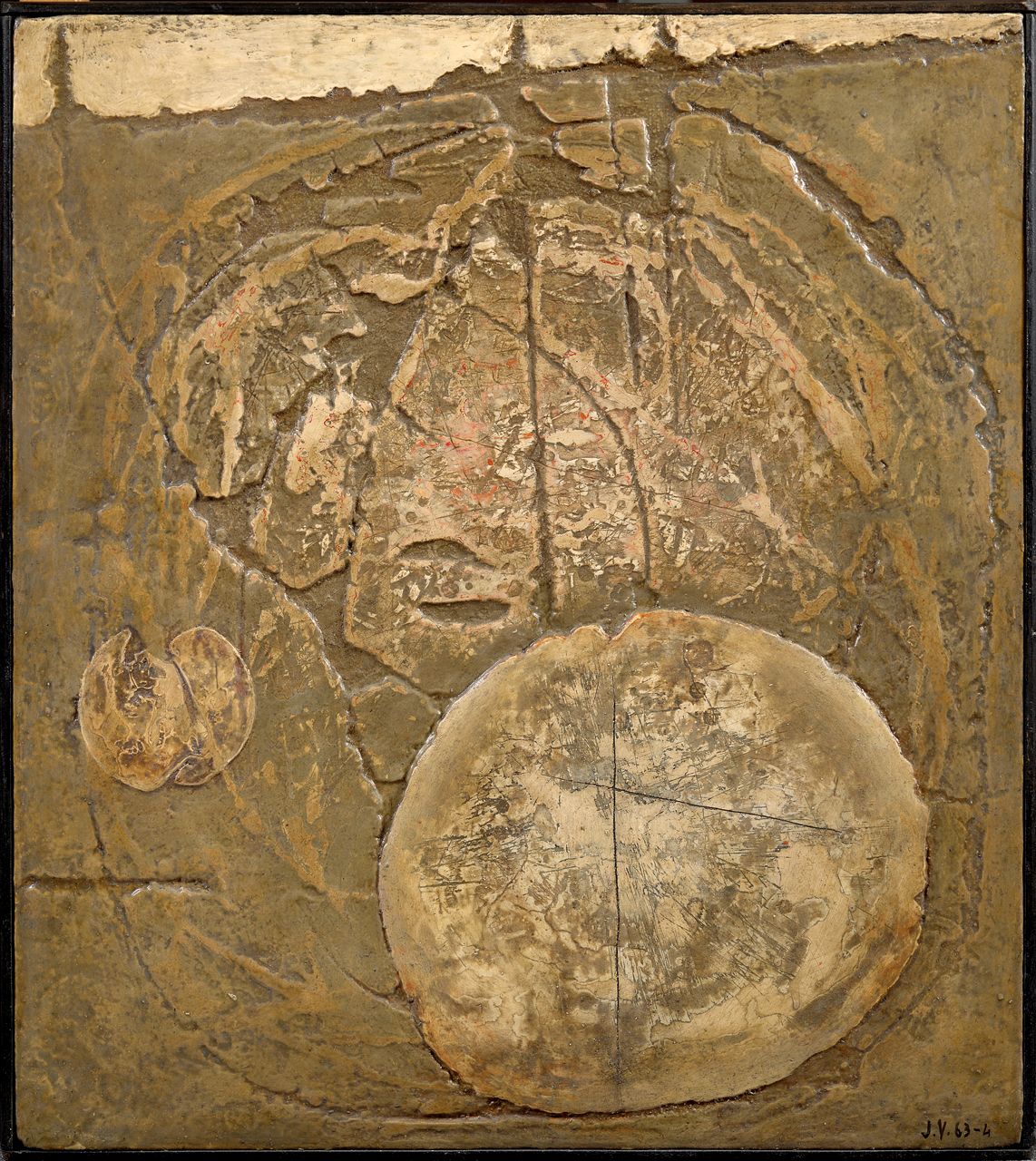
Study II (1963-1964), GASK Kutná Hora

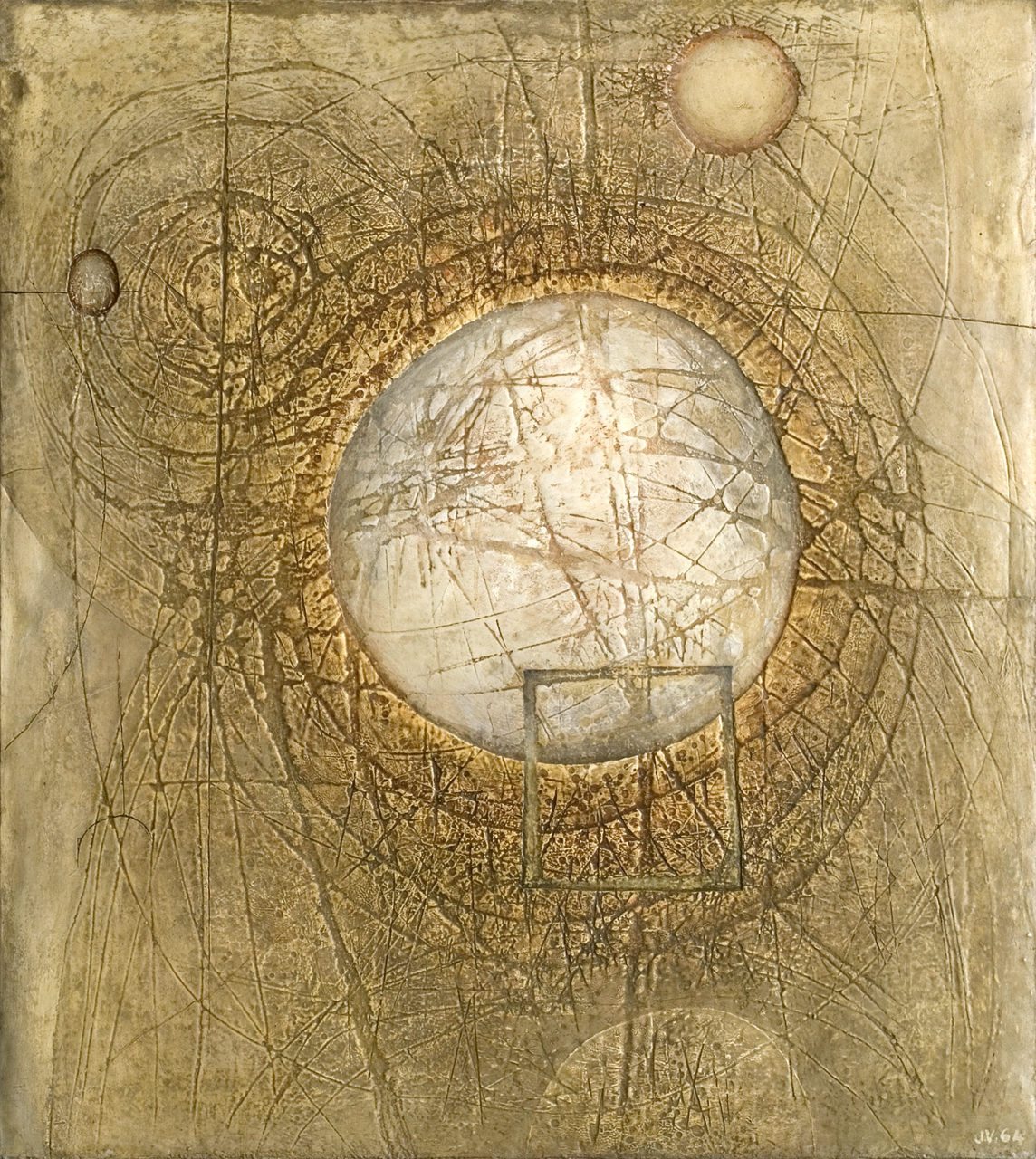
Synthetic Tissue I (1964), GU Karlovy Vary

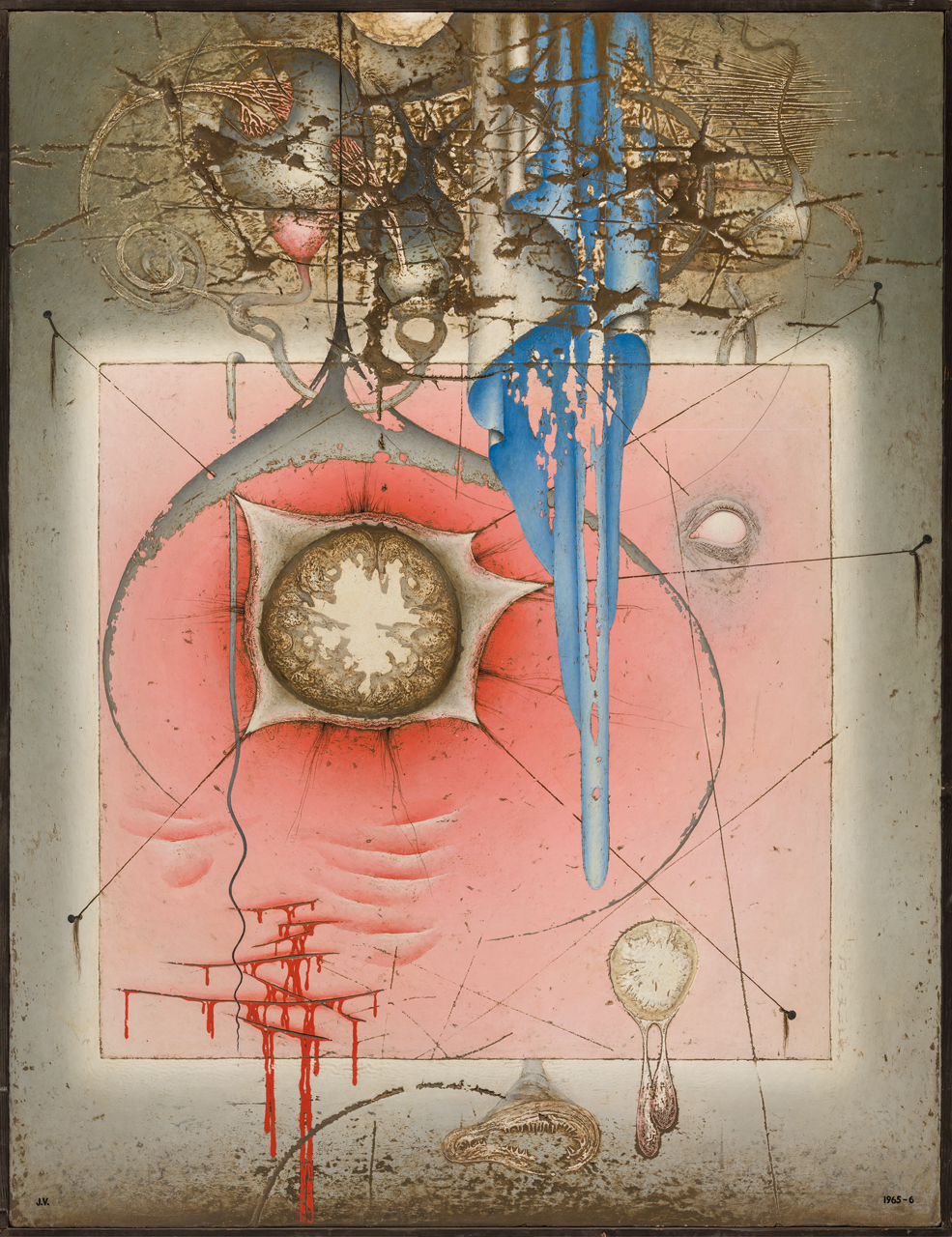
Portrait of a Blind Young Man (1965-1966), National Gallery in Prague

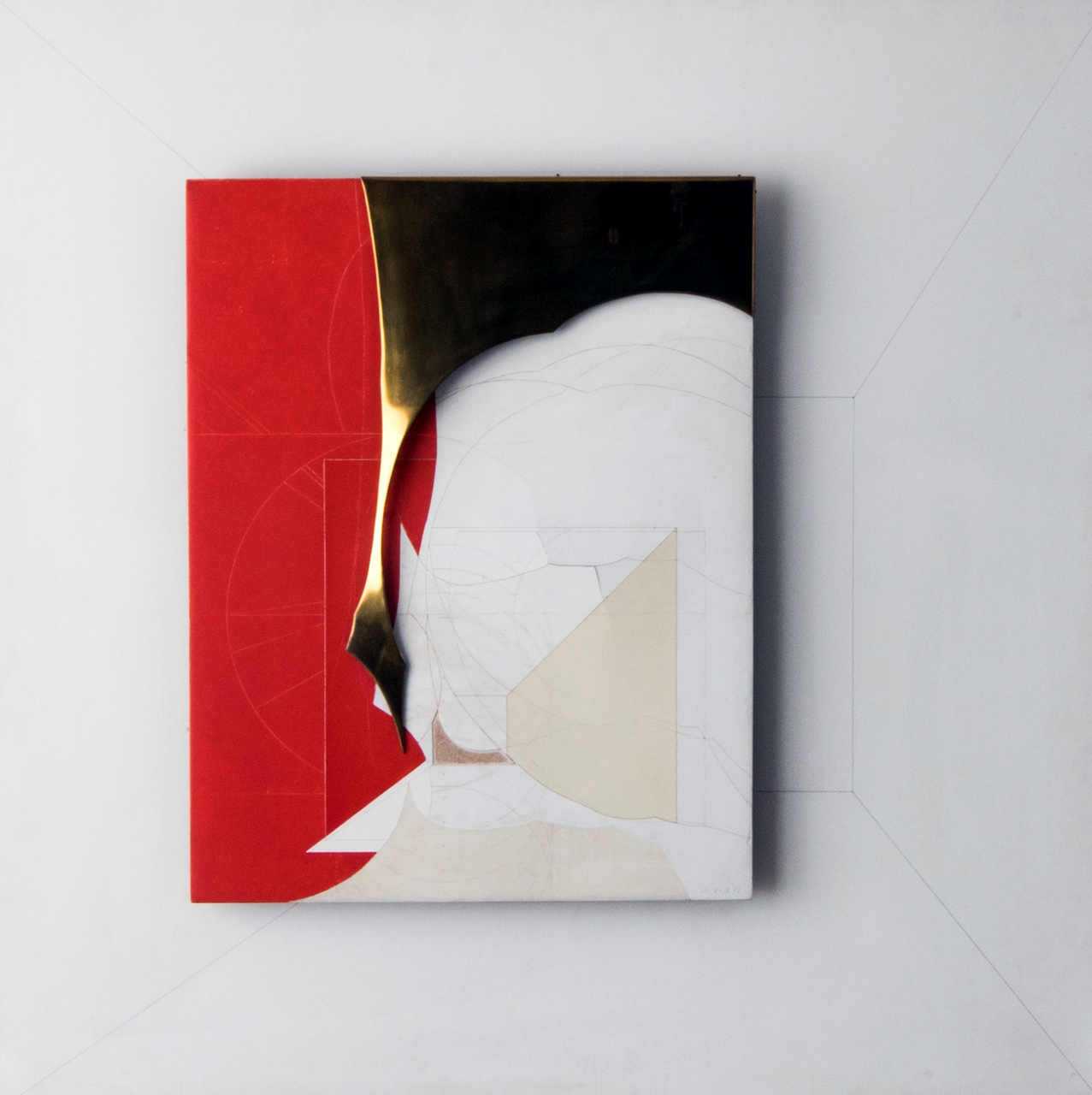
Votive Panel for St. Lala (1970)

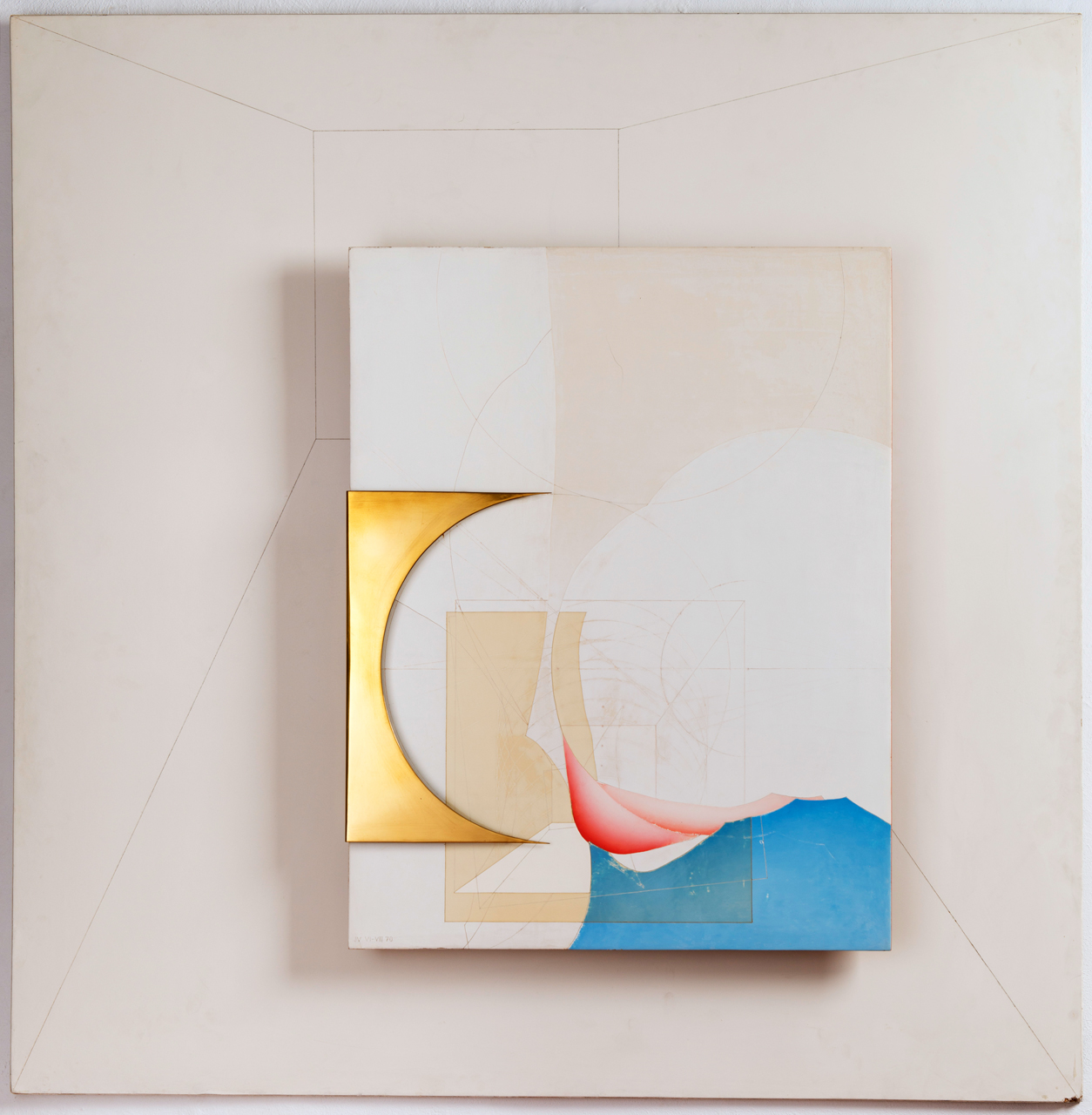
Votive Panel for St. Lala (1970), GASK Kutná Hora

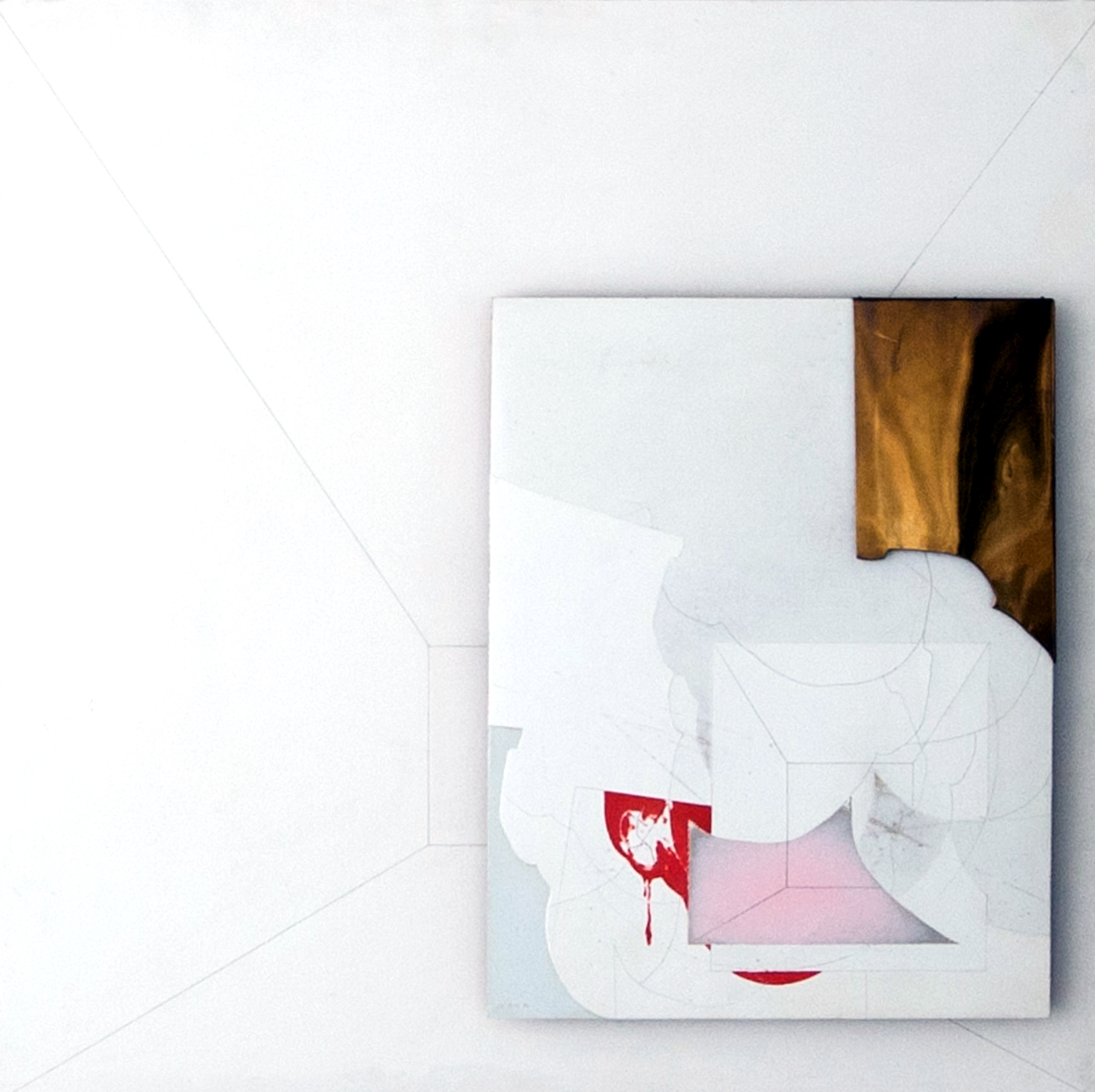
Votivtafel über heiligen Krapp II (1970)

Valenta has ceased to label the following works from the 1970s with titles and only assigns them a sequence in the Paintings series. They contain an allusion to a particular motif - Jacqueline Kennedy's feet, which Valenta spotted in a fashion magazine and converted into a flat sign. The twisted thumb disturbs the perfect composition and brings up feelings of humanity, tenderness and vulnerability. The cycle develops the artist's spiritual conception of the link between the corporeal and the ephemeral in the order of the world. The dominant colour is white, complemented by pencil drawing and accentuated by a fragment of an area of pure colour. Metallic elements are affixed to a ground of wood or Plexiglas to complement the irregular areas of transparent film, and white and coloured papers pasted in as a collage (Painting I-XXI, 1972–1975). The subject matter for the paintings consists of a large series of drawings, interconnected by repetitive marks transmitted through stencils, which are gradually altered and simplified to a final predominance of white. The purpose of the meditation that the painter conducts in the course of his conceptual work is the liberation and emptying of the interior and the attainment of absolute purity.

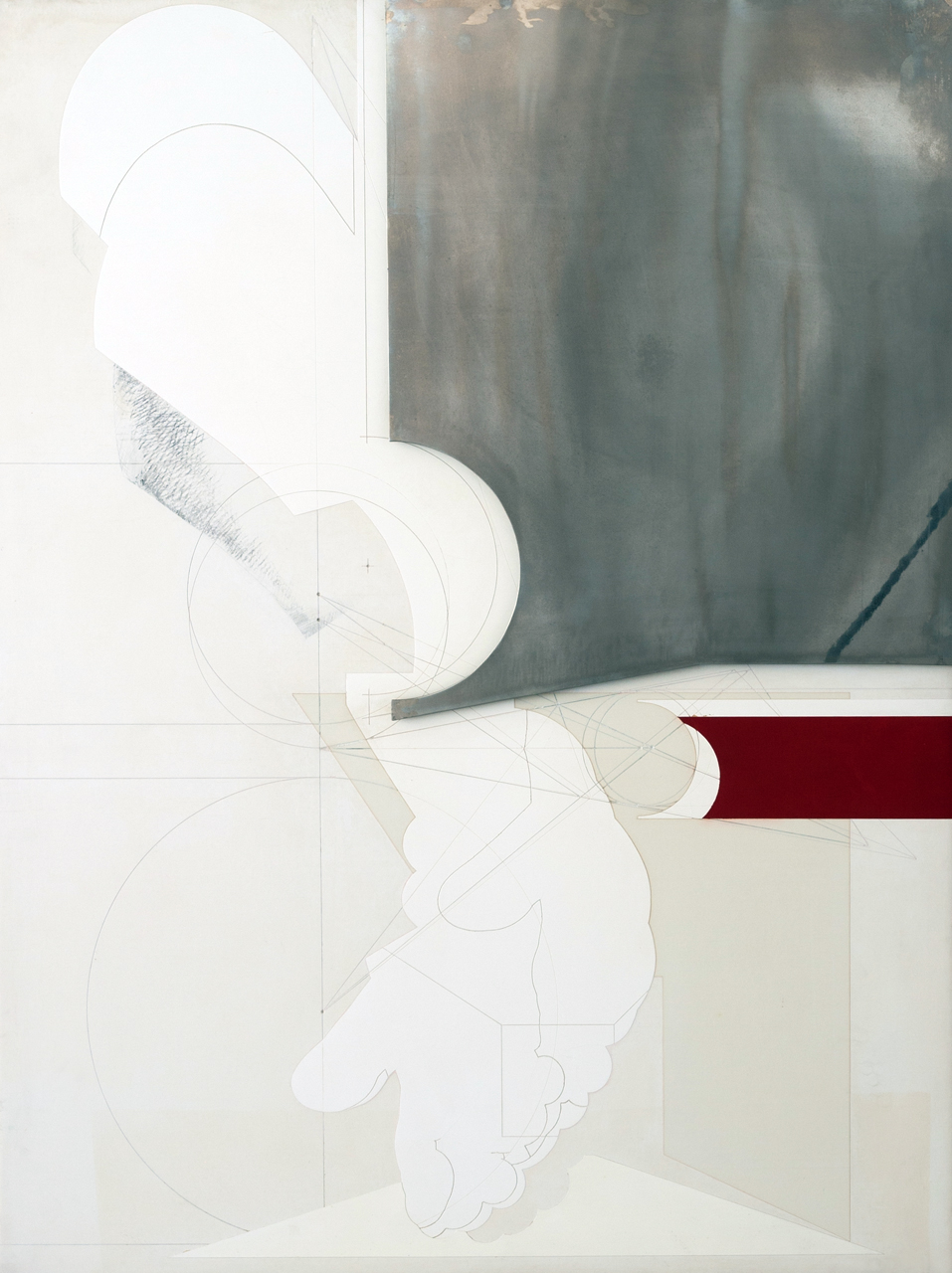
Jiří Valenta, Bild III (1971)

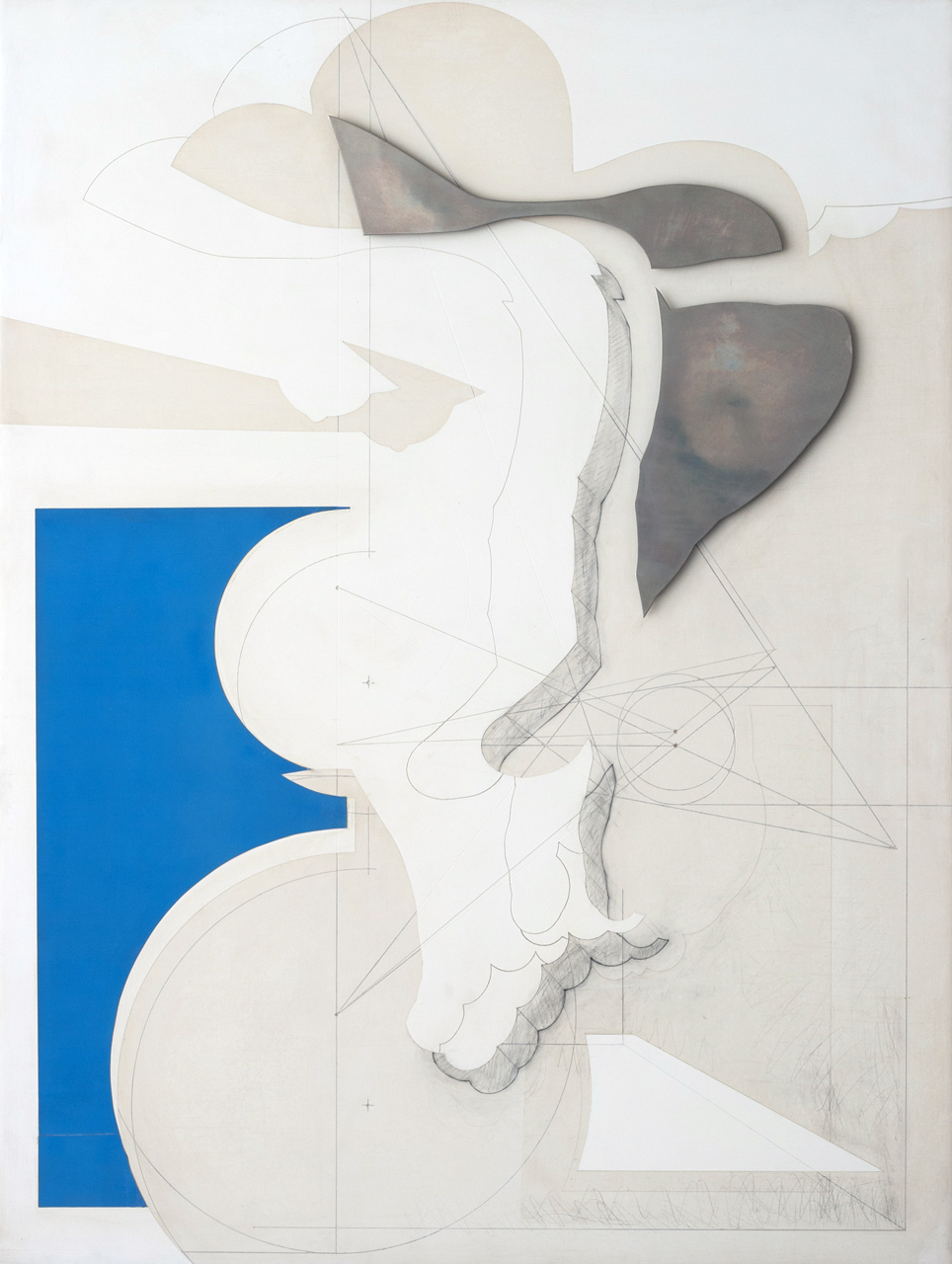
Jiří Valenta, Bild XI (1971)

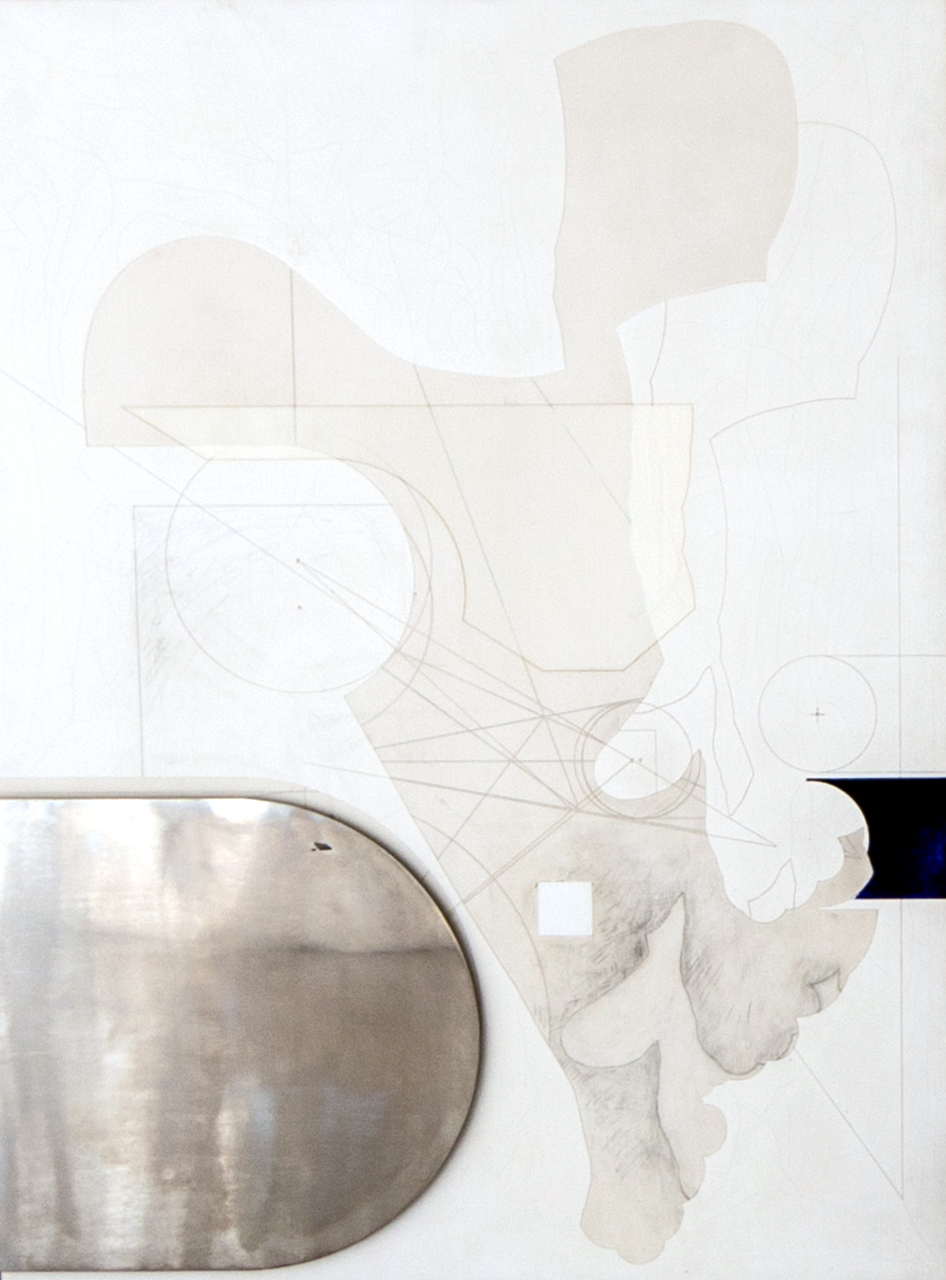
Jiří Valenta, Bild XVII (1971)

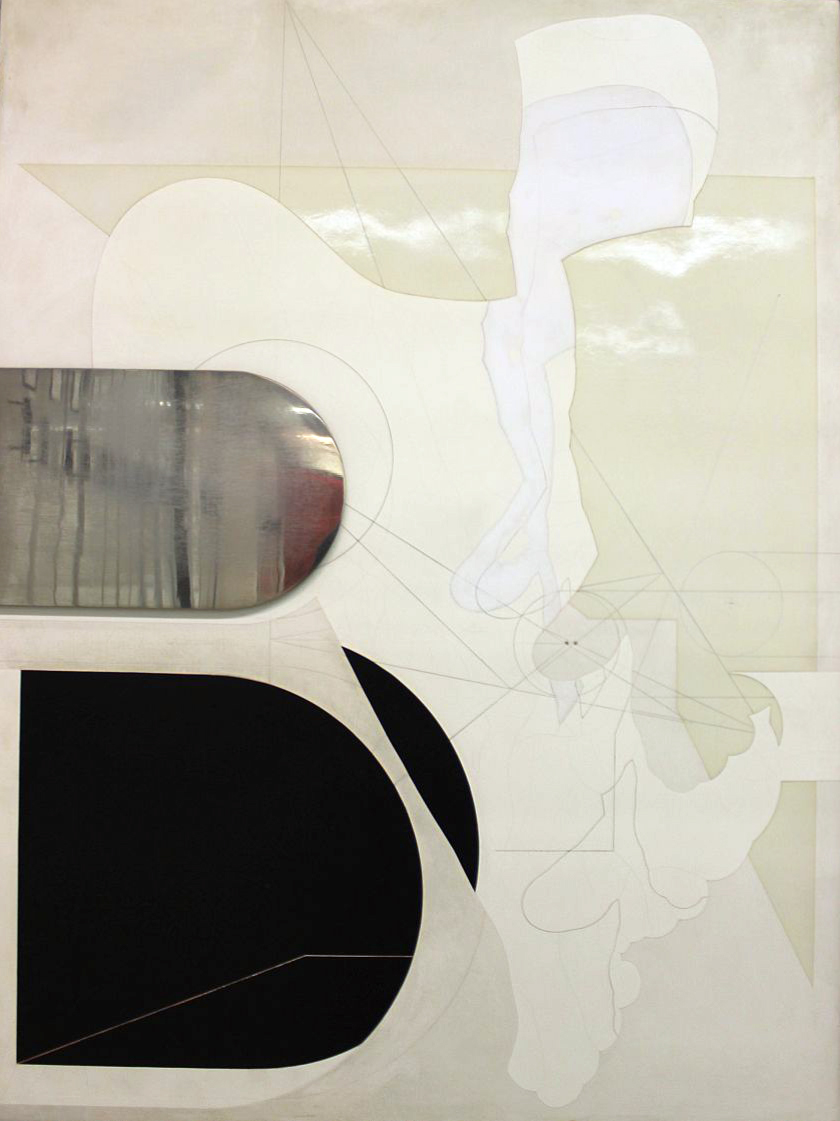
Jiří Valenta, Bild VI (1971), GASK Kutná Hora

In 1978, Jiří Valenta felt that he was no longer able to express himself through painting, so he stopped painting and devoted himself to photography for the rest of his life. Linhartová suggests that in his case, the over-theorizing may have become an obstacle to the spontaneous process of creation. Until 1990, he made around 5,000 images, which he developed and saved as negatives, but only a small part of them were enlarged. His last drawings are followed by his earliest black and white photographs, a series of still lifes with white cups, with shadows tinted a light brown (chamois). He had some of them framed and hung them on the white-painted walls of his Cologne apartment, which gradually became a work of art itself, reflecting Valenta's obsession with purity. The following series of images, which zoom in on parts of the human body in great detail (Buttocks, 1979) or rose blossoms (Roses, 1979), have an overtly erotic subtext. Valenta continued to take photographs until 1991 and also created colourful, often informel compositions. "Just as in painting, where he wanted to reach the limit of the absolute, where form and perfection collided, in photography he wanted to reach the last possibility, beyond which nothing opens up anymore, because a full stop has been made."

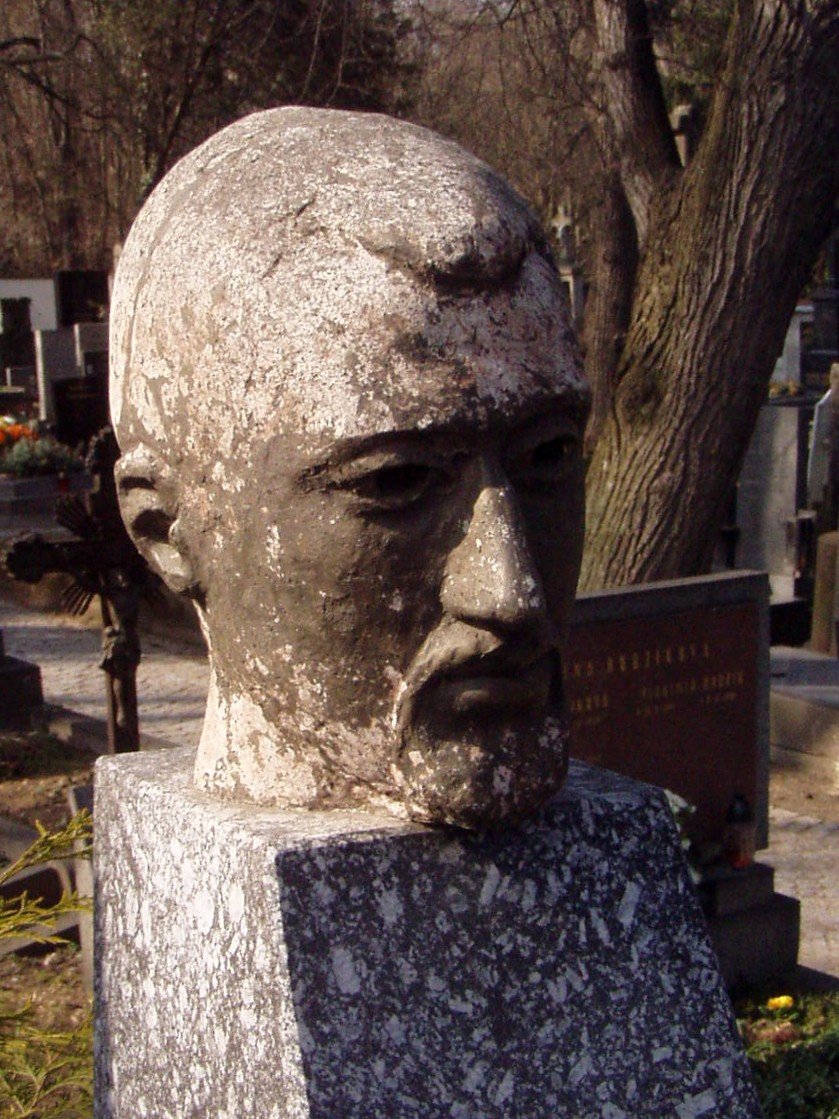
Bust of Jiří Valenta by Jan Koblasa, Břevnov cemetery

=== Representation in collections ===
- Gallery of the Central Bohemian Region in Kutná Hora (GASK)
- Gallery of Modern Art in Roudnice nad Labem
- Museum of Art Olomouc
- Aleš South Bohemian Gallery in Hluboká nad Vltavou
- Art Gallery Karlovy Vary
- Gallery of Modern Art in Hradec Králové
- Gallery of Fine Arts in Ostrava
- Regional Gallery in Liberec

=== Exhibitions ===
==== Solo ====
- 1963 Jiří Valenta: Drawings 1959–1962, Club of Fine Artists, Mánes Prague
- 1965 Jiří Valenta: Paintings from 1959 to 1965, House of the Lords of Kunštát, Brno
- 1966 Jiří Valenta: Panel Paintings, Gallery of Youth, Mánes, Prague
- 1968 Jiří Valenta: Malerei-Graphik-Objekte, Neue Universitätsbibliothek, Kiel
- 1969 Jiří Valenta, Jan Koblasa, bbk Galerie, Hannover
- 1969 Jiří Valenta, Galerie Matou, Hamburg
- 1969 Jiří Valenta, Jan Koblasa, Schloss Celle
- 1970 Jiří Valenta, Jan Koblasa, Städtische Kunstgalerie Bochum
- 1972 Jiří Valenta: Bilder, Zeichnungen, Graphik, Galerie Die Goldschmiede, Bochum
- 1995/1996 Jiří Valenta (1936 - 1991): Collective Works / Gesamtwerk, Wallenstein Riding School, Prague, House of Arts, Ostrava, Museum Bochum
- 1998 Jiří Valenta: Photographs / Fotografien, Gallery of Modern Art in Roudnice nad Labem
- 2002 Jiří Valenta: Works from 1967 - 1977, Ztichlá klika Gallery, Prague
- 2004 Jiří Valenta: Collages, Galerie Litera, Prague
- 2009 Jiří Valenta: Anthropometric Meditations, Galerie Brno
- 2015 Jiří Valenta: Malíř fotografem, Interactive Gallery Becherova vila, Karlovy Vary[16]
- 2016/2017 Jiří Valenta a mysterium uměleckého znovzrození: Informelní tendence v 50. a 60. letech 20. století / Jiří Valenta and the Mystery of Artistic Rebirth: Informel Tendencies in the 50's and 60's of the 20th Century, Museum Kampa - Jana a Medy Mládkových Foundation, Praha

==== Collective exhibitions abroad (selection) ====
- 1962 IV. Biennale des Jeunes, Musée d´Art moderne, Paris
- 1965 IV. Biennale de Paris, Musée d'Art Moderne de la Ville de Paris (ARC), Paris
- 1965 Cinque jeunes peintres d'Europe de l'est, Galerie Lambert, Paris
- 1965 Małarstwo a rzeźba z Pragi, Kraków, Kraków
- 1967 Moderne Kunst aus Prag, Caroline-Mathilde-Räume im Celler Schloß, Celle, Wilhelm-Morgner-Haus, Soest, Kunsthalle zu Kiel, Kiel
- 1968 Künstlergruppe arche mit 10 Malern aus Prag, Kunstkreis Hameln, Fritz-Henßler-Haus, Dortmund
- 1969 Jan Koblasa, Jiří Valenta, Schloß Celle, Celle
- 1970 Konstgruppen Grupp, Galleri 54, Göteborg, Alingsås konsthall, Alingsås
- 1970 Guderna, Hovadík, Koblasa, Valenta, The Merton Gallery, Toronto
- 1974 Tschechische Künstler, Galerie Ursula Wendtorf + Franz Swetec, Düsseldorf
- 1980 Die Kunst Osteuropas im 20. Jahrhundert, Garmisch-Partenkirchen
- 1985 Schmerzende Wunde, Galerie Rafay, Kronberg im Taunus (Hochtaunuskreis)
- 1987/1988 Berlin - Tendenz - abstrakt: Brenneisen, Fuchs-Heidelberg, Lehmann, Matsuo, Valenta, Kunsthaus, Nürnberg
- 1991 Czeska sztuka 2. połowy XX wieku ze zbiorów Galerii Sztuk Plastycznych w Ostrawie, Muzeum Górnośląskie w Bytomiu, Bytom
- 1996 Eine Promenade der Romantiker, Stadtmuseum Göhre, Jena
- 1998 Jan Koblasa, Jiří Valenta, Botschaft der Tschechischen Republik, Bonn
- 2005 Argumenta z kolekcji Gerharda Jürgena Bluma-Kwiatkovskiego, Atlas Sztuki, Łódź

== Sources ==
=== Catalogues ===
- Jiří Valenta: Paintings from 1959 to 1965, 1965, Šmejkal František, cat. 16 p., House of the Lords of Kunštát, Brno
- Jiří Valenta: Panel Paintings, 1966, Linhartová Věra, cat. 8 p., SČVU Praha
- Jiří Valenta (1936-1991).
- Jiří Valenta: Fotografie / Fotografien, 1998, Hlaváčková Miroslava, cat. 30 p., Gallery of Modern Art in Roudnice nad Labem
- Jiří Valenta: Works from 1967 - 1977, 2002, Primus Zdenek, cat. 4 p., Galerie Ztichlá klika, Prague
- Jiří Valenta : Freiräume; Malerei, Grafik, Fotografie, 2002, Alexander von Knorre, Birgit Poppe, Emschertal-Museum, Herne
- Jiří Valenta: Anthropometric Meditations, 2009, Koblasa Jan, Víchová Czakó Ilona, cat. 75 p., Galerie Brno

=== Publications ===
- Jaroslav Šerých, Quatrième biennale de Paris, 207 p., Musée d'Art Moderne de la Ville de Paris (ARC), Paris 1965
- Mahulena Nešlehová et al., Czech Informel (Pioneers of Abstraction 1957–1964), 1991, Prague City Gallery
- Mahulena Nešlehová, The Message of Another Expression : the Concept of "Informel" in Czech Art of the 1950s and the First Half of the 1960s, published by the Prague Art Gallery. BASE, ARTetFACT, Prague 1997, ISBN 80-902160-0-5 (ARTetFACT; bound), ISBN 80-902481-0-1 (BASE; bound)
- Věra Linhartová, The White World of Jiří Valenta, in. Articles and studies from 1962 to 2002, Torst Prague 2010, ISBN 978-80-7215-392-3
- Mahulena Nešlehová, Geometric Meditations. Drawings and paintings by Jiří Valenta from 1971 to 1977, in.
- Zdeněk Primus, Hommage à Jiří Valenta, KANT - Karel Kerlický, Prague 2010, ISBN 978-80-7437-015-1
