= Aleš Veselý =

Czech sculptor, graphic artist, painter and academy teacher

Prof., Acad. sculptor Aleš Veselý
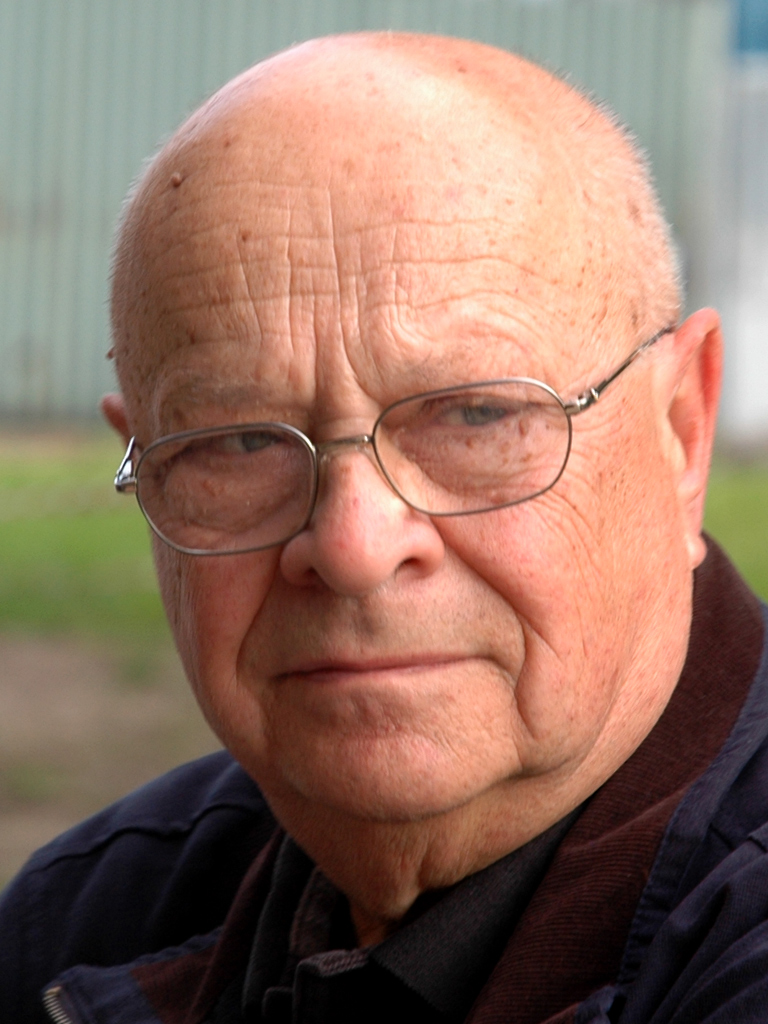
- Aleš Veselý in 2013
- Born: 3 February 1935; Čáslav, Czechoslovakia
- Died: 14 December 2015 (aged 80); Prague, Czech Republic
- Education: Academy of Fine Arts, Prague
- Known for: sculptor, painter, graphic artist, academy teacher
- Awards: Critics' Prize at the Biennale de Paris (1965), The Chicago Prize, John David Mooney Foundation (1994)

Aleš Veselý (3 February 1935 – 14 December 2015) was a Czech sculptor, graphic artist, painter and academy teacher.

== Life ==
Aleš Veselý was born on 3 February 1935 in Čáslav. He came from a mixed Jewish family of an insurance clerk and during World War II he lived with his parents in Hradec Králové. As a six-year-old boy, he had to wear the yellow six-pointed star in public and this experience marked him for life. His father and sister were deported to the Theresienstadt Ghetto in Terezín, but managed to escape before the end of the war and returned home. During the war, 47 of his relatives were murdered. Aleš Veselý, as a Jew, was not allowed to go to school and did not graduate from the fifth grade of primary school until after the war. His father got a new job in Ústí nad Labem, where Aleš Veselý started to study at the gymnasium. After the education reform he finished the so-called Unified School of the Second Grade in Prague.

From childhood he painted and later attended the Secondary Art school in Prague, but after two years his professors recommended him to go to the Academy. At the age of seventeen, he was admitted without a high school diploma and without meeting the prescribed minimum age to the graphic arts preparatory school. Eventually he completed his entire studies in the graphic studio of Prof. Vladimír Silovský, where there was a very free atmosphere and it was sufficient to bring one's home works several times during the year. Since moving to Prague, he learned to play the piano while improvising and composing his own music. Until the early 1960s, he considered music more creative and hesitated to pursue it professionally. It was not until the advent of abstraction that he finally decided to pursue visual art.

During his studies, he went to the small mountain village of Sihelné in the Slovak Western Carpathians to paint during holidays, and later also in autumn and winter. He himself states that the village's archetypal environment, reading and music were at the origin of his journey towards abstraction. After graduating from the Prague Academy (1952–1958), he was automatically accepted as a candidate of the Union of Visual Artists, which allowed him to apply for creative scholarships and public commissions or to acquire his own studio. After three years, however, he was told that his works expressed a view of life that contradicted the conclusions of the 14th Congress of the Communist Party of the Soviet Union, and his support was terminated. In the late 1950s, he became interested in material abstraction and was one of a group of artists who later held the first unofficial studio exhibition, called Confrontation in Jiří Valenta's studio. The second of these exhibitions took place in the autumn of 1960 in the newly acquired basement studio of Aleš Veselý in Žižkov. In 1960, a congress of the international association of art critics AICA was held in Warsaw, whose participants then visited Prague. The hastily organised visit to the studios appealed to Pierre Restany, who, together with some others, published a series of articles on modern Czech art in the magazines Kunstwerk and Cimaise.

At the beginning of the 1960s, when the regime was partially relaxed, Aleš Veselý had his first solo exhibition at the Young Artists Gallery of Umělecká beseda (1963). This was followed by the ground-breaking Exhibition D at the Nová síň Gallery in 1964, where the leading protagonists of Czech Informel presented themselves as mature individuals and their differentiation of opinion became fully apparent. Aleš Veselý exhibited his sculptures Chair-Usurper and Enigmatic Objects there. The following year he received the Critics' Prize at the Biennale de Paris.

In 1967, after Aleš Veselý's father died in May, he and seven other sculptors were invited to the first Symposium of Spatial Forms in Ostrava. His stay in the steelworks, where he had an unlimited amount of material at his disposal and where he created seven sculptures, was gradually extended by the organisers of the symposium until 1968 and was only ended by the Invasion of Czechoslovakia by Warsaw Pact troops on 21 August 1968. His most famous sculpture, Kaddish, which he saw as his personal prayer for his deceased father, was created there. He then returned to Prague, where his daughter Jana was born from his first marriage (1968). In 1969 he participated in the exhibition Sculpture and the City in Liberec and received the Matthias Braun Award from the international jury for his sculpture Kaddish (named Prayer for the Deceased for the exhibition). His sculptures, including the "Chair-Usurper", were purchased by the National Gallery in Prague in the same year. The exhibition of the sculpture Prayer for the Dead evoked unintended connotations at the time when Jan Palach burned himself to death. At the beginning of the so-called normalization in 1970, Aleš Veselý was among the artists who were persecuted by the regime, lost the possibility to exhibit or bid for public commissions. He had to hastily take care of the rescue of the Kaddish, which was threatened with scrapping. Other sculptures were temporarily placed in a welding workshop on the outskirts of Prague before he managed to acquire a demolished mill and fenced-off land in the village of Středokluky. While moving the sculptures in early 1971, he suffered a heart attack. In 1972, for unexplained reasons, his wife committed suicide by jumping from a window, seriously injuring their daughter Jana.

In the 1970s, he withdrew into isolation in his studio in Středokluky, and in this timelessness, paradoxically, he experienced absolute freedom of creation because he could not expect to exhibit the works. Until 1982, he was a member of the alternative music group Frog's Slime, which also participated in the Prague Jazz Days and recorded several pieces of improvised industrial jazz in the sound studio of the Atelier Theatre (now the seat of the Ypsilon Theatre). The recordings were released on two CDs by Guerilla Records. In the late 1970s he was invited to participate in a sculpture symposium in Bochum and was given permission to travel. During his stay in Bochum in 1979, he received another offer and won a competition to execute another giant fifteen-ton sculpture in the city of Hamm the following year.

In 1986, Aleš Veselý received an American scholarship from the Soros Foundation. His journey to the USA was preceded by several hours of interrogation by the State Security and intimidation, but he eventually got his passport back and was able to leave. On the recommendation of the French art theorist Pierre Restany, who visited the studio in Středokluky in the mid-1980s, Aleš Veselý was selected among the world artists who were invited to exhibit and create in Seoul during the Olympics (1988). His sculpture Testimony from 1968 was placed in the Olympic Park.

After the fall of the communist regime, Aleš Veselý had his first exhibition in an official exhibition hall in 27 years (Nová síň Gallery, 4 June – 1 July 1990) and was also asked to take over teaching sculpture at the Prague Academy. He worked as the head of the monumental sculpture studio at the Academy from 1990 to 2006 and then for another three years at the Jan Evangelista Purkyně University in Ústí nad Labem (2012–2015). In 1992 he had a major exhibition in the Ballroom of Prague Castle and adjacent gardens. During the 1990s he was frequently invited abroad (Germany, USA, Japan, Israel) and repeatedly exhibited in regional galleries. In 2005–2006, the Egon Schiele Art Centre in Český Krumlov held a retrospective exhibition of his work, and in 2009 his monumental sculptures were exhibited in Litomyšl. On the occasion of the artist's 80th birthday in 2015, simultaneous exhibitions were held in four Prague galleries and in his studio in Středokluky. Aleš Veselý died unexpectedly in Prague on 14 December 2015.

=== Scholarships ===
- 1995 Pollock-Krasner Foundation Grant, Chicago, IL, USA
- 1993 Arts Link Fellowship at The Fabric Workshop, Philadelphia, PA, USA
- 1986 International Sculpture Center Fellowship, Washington, D.C., USA

=== Awards ===
- 1994 The Chicago Prize, John David Mooney Foundation, Chicago, IL, USA
- 1969 Matthias Braun Prize for the Kaddish sculpture at the exhibition Sculpture and the City, Liberec
- 1965 Critics' Prize for the sculpture Chair Usurper at the 4th Biennale de Paris, France

== Work ==
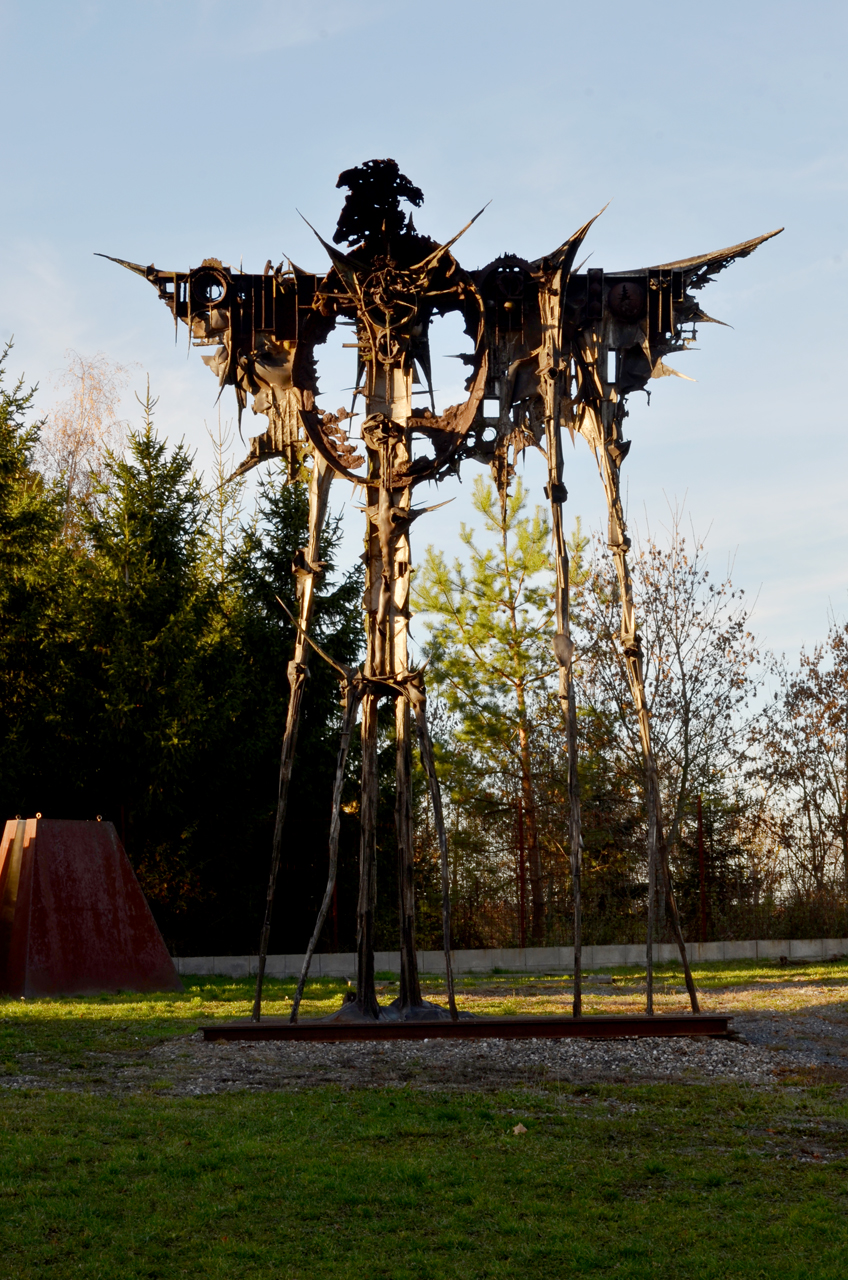
Aleš Veselý, Kaddish (1967–1969)

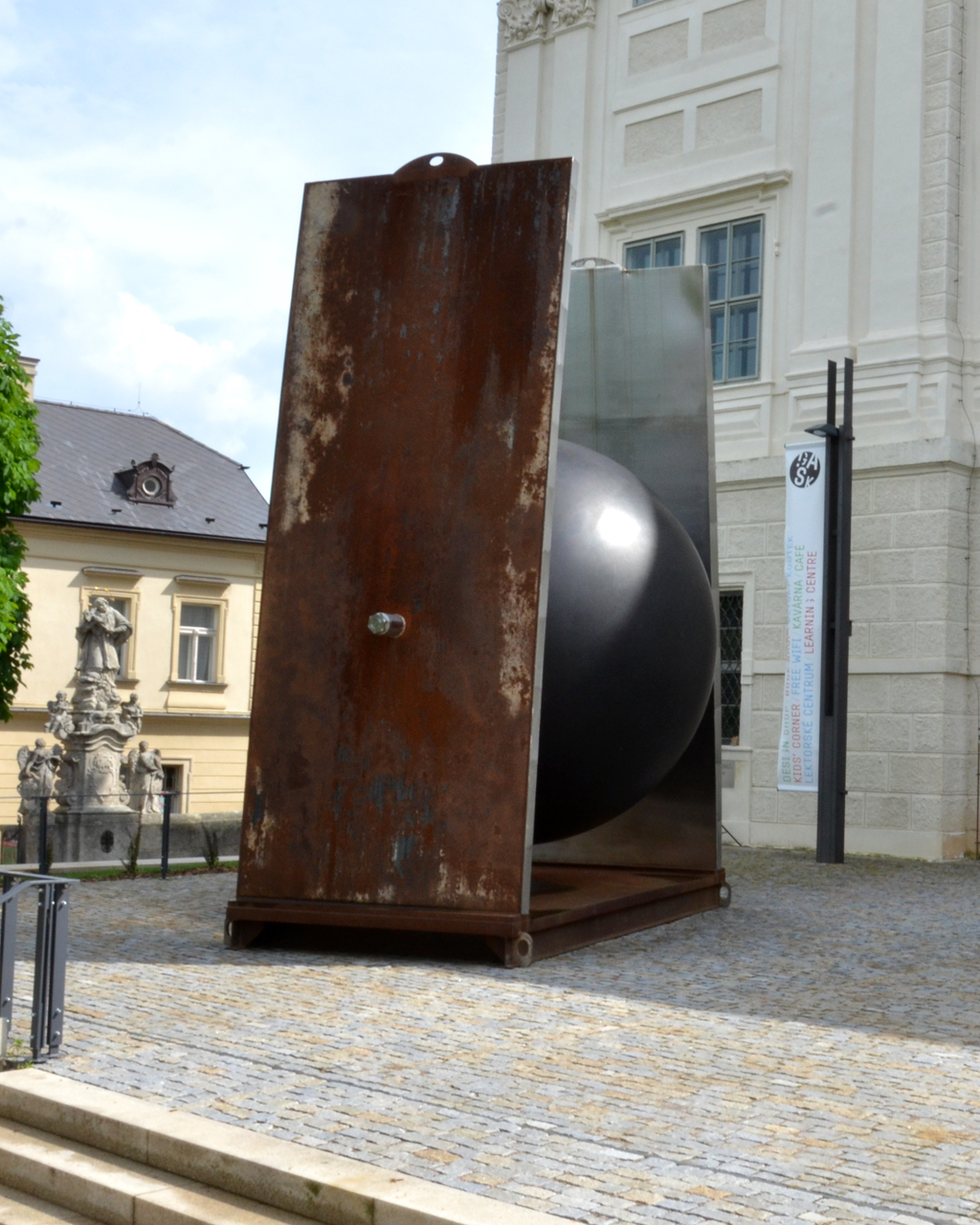
Aleš Veselý, Entering the Law (2014), Gallery of the Central Bohemian Region in Kutná Hora

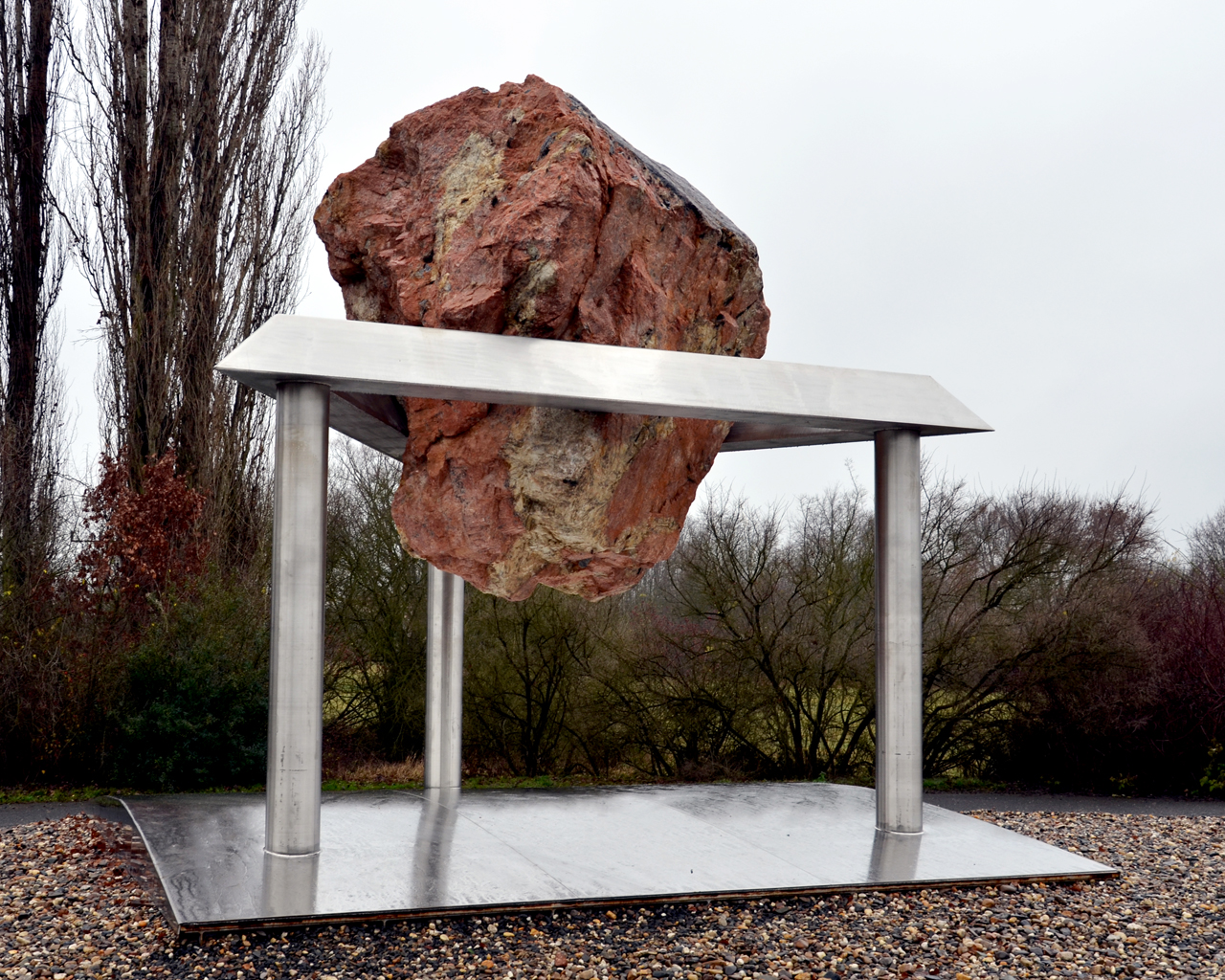
Aleš Veselý, The Law of Irreversibility (2015), Terezín

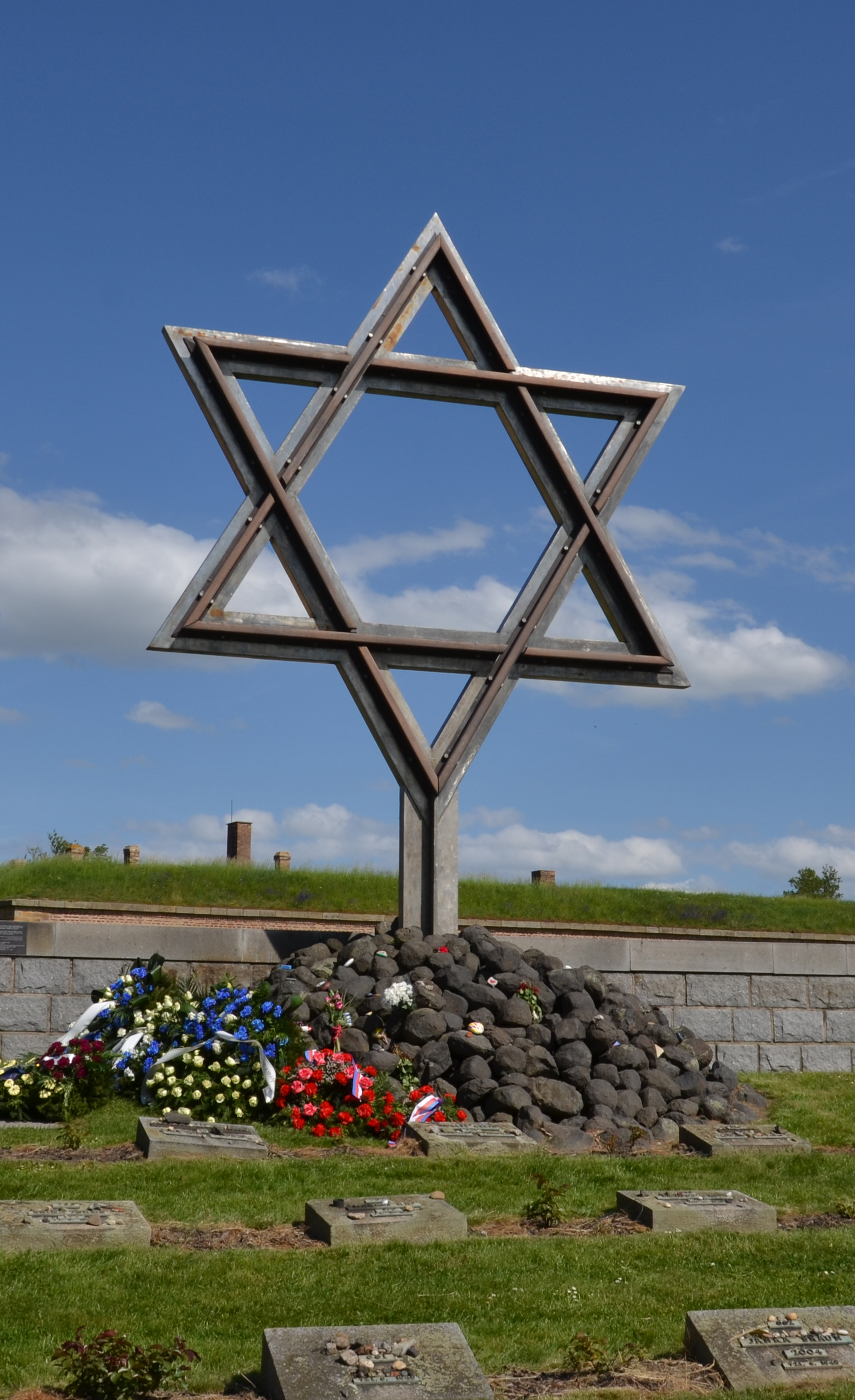
Aleš Veselý, Magen David, National Cemetery Terezín

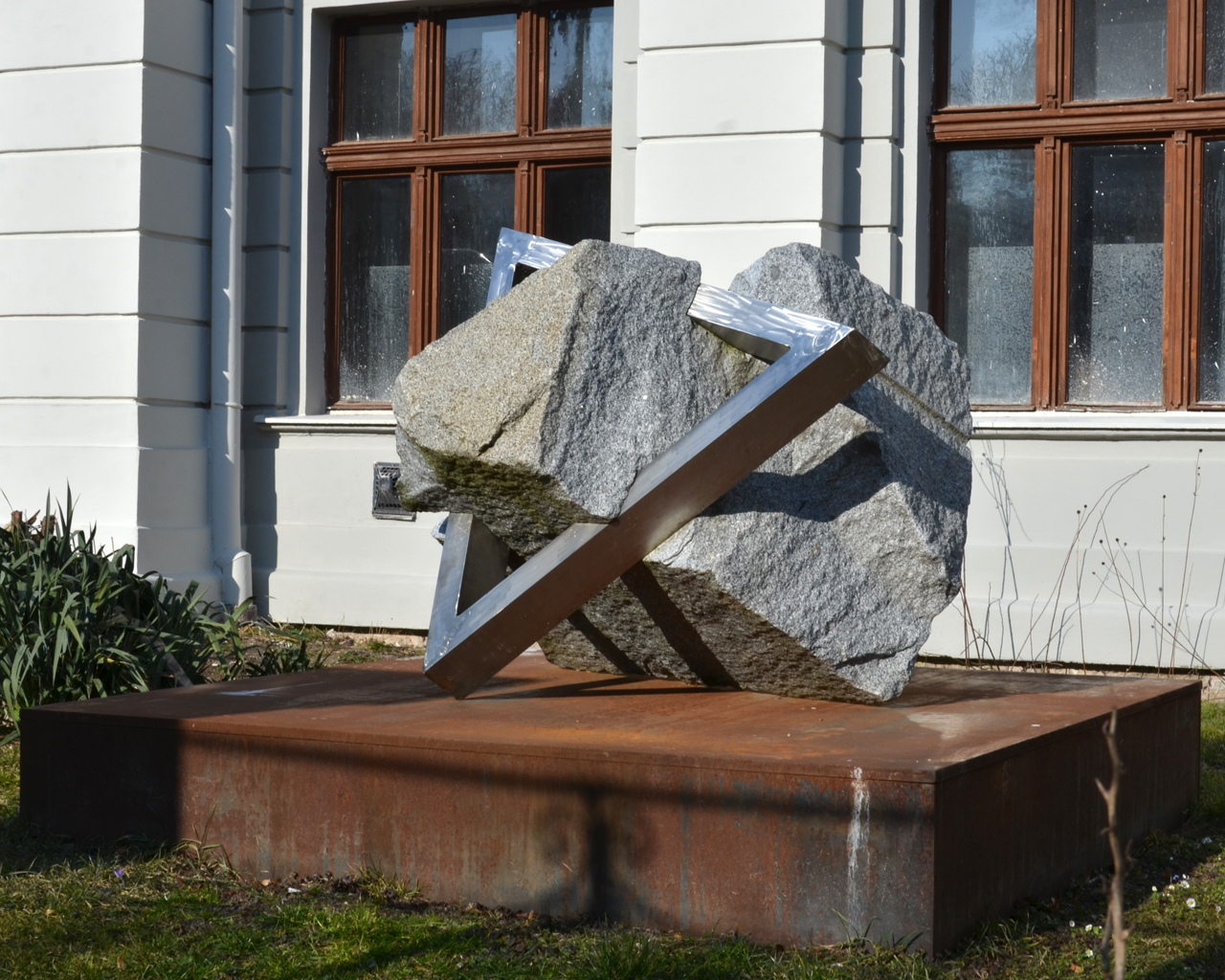
Aleš Veselý, Holocaust memorial (2008), Kutná Hora

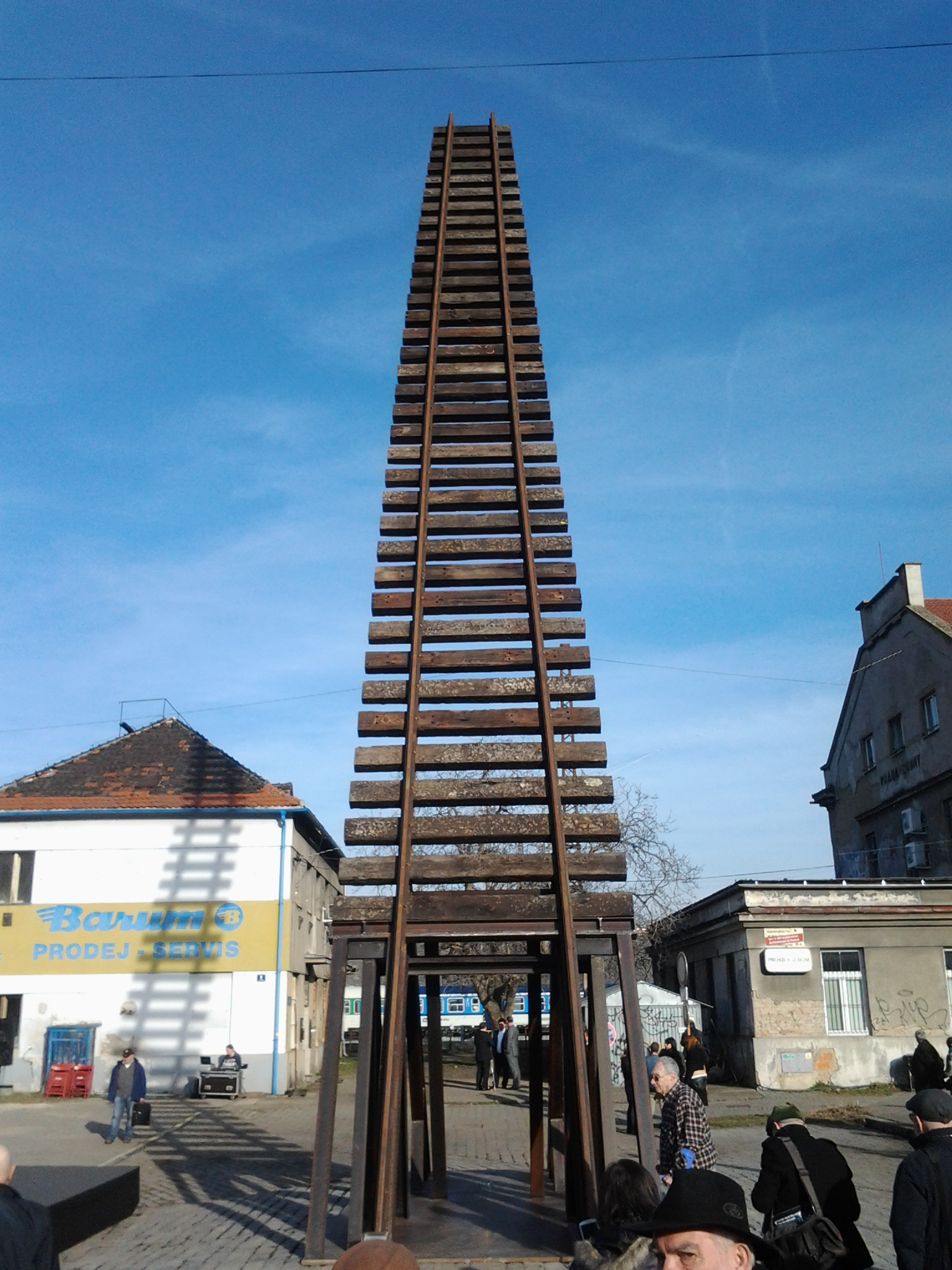
Aleš Veselý, Gate of No Return (2015), Memorial of Silence, Former railway station Praha-Bubny

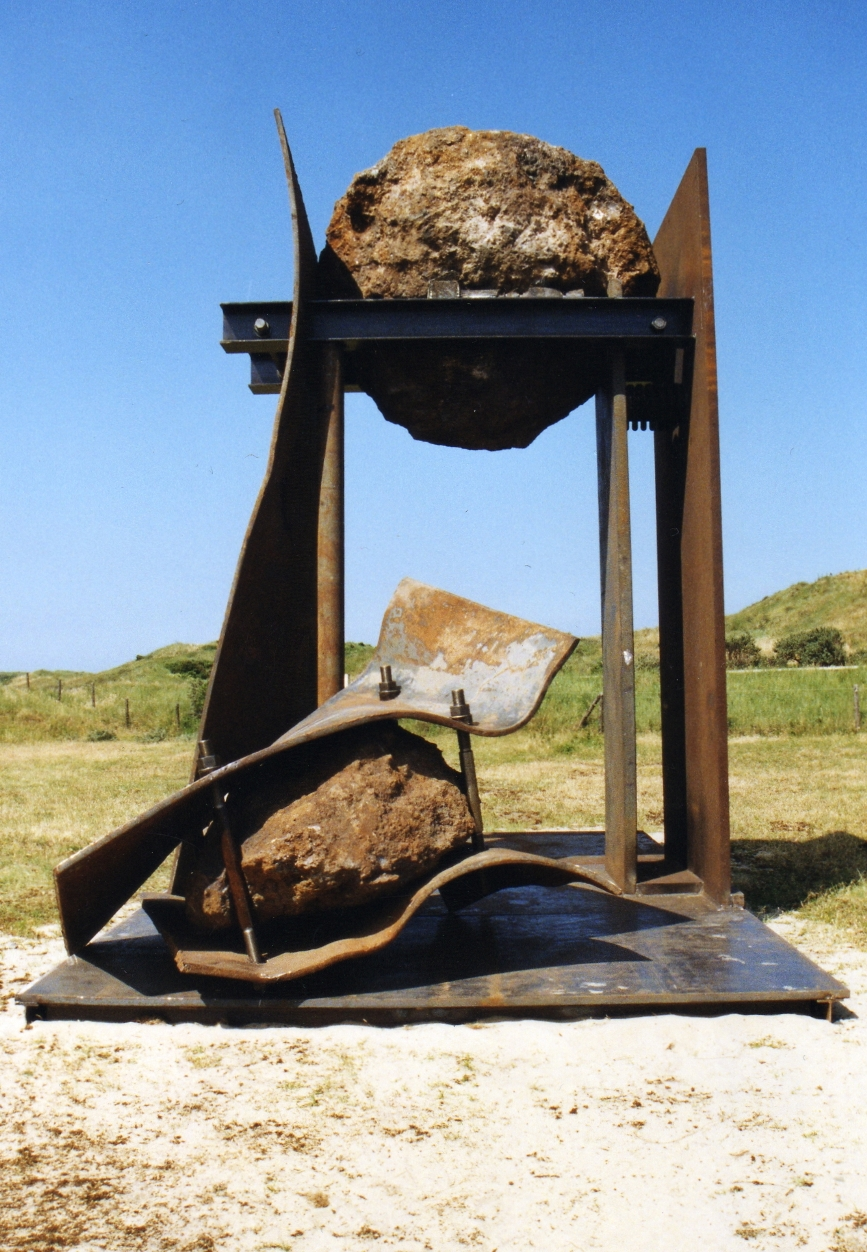
Aleš Veselý, Messengers, Sculpturepark Een Zee van Staal in Wijk aan Zee, Netherlands

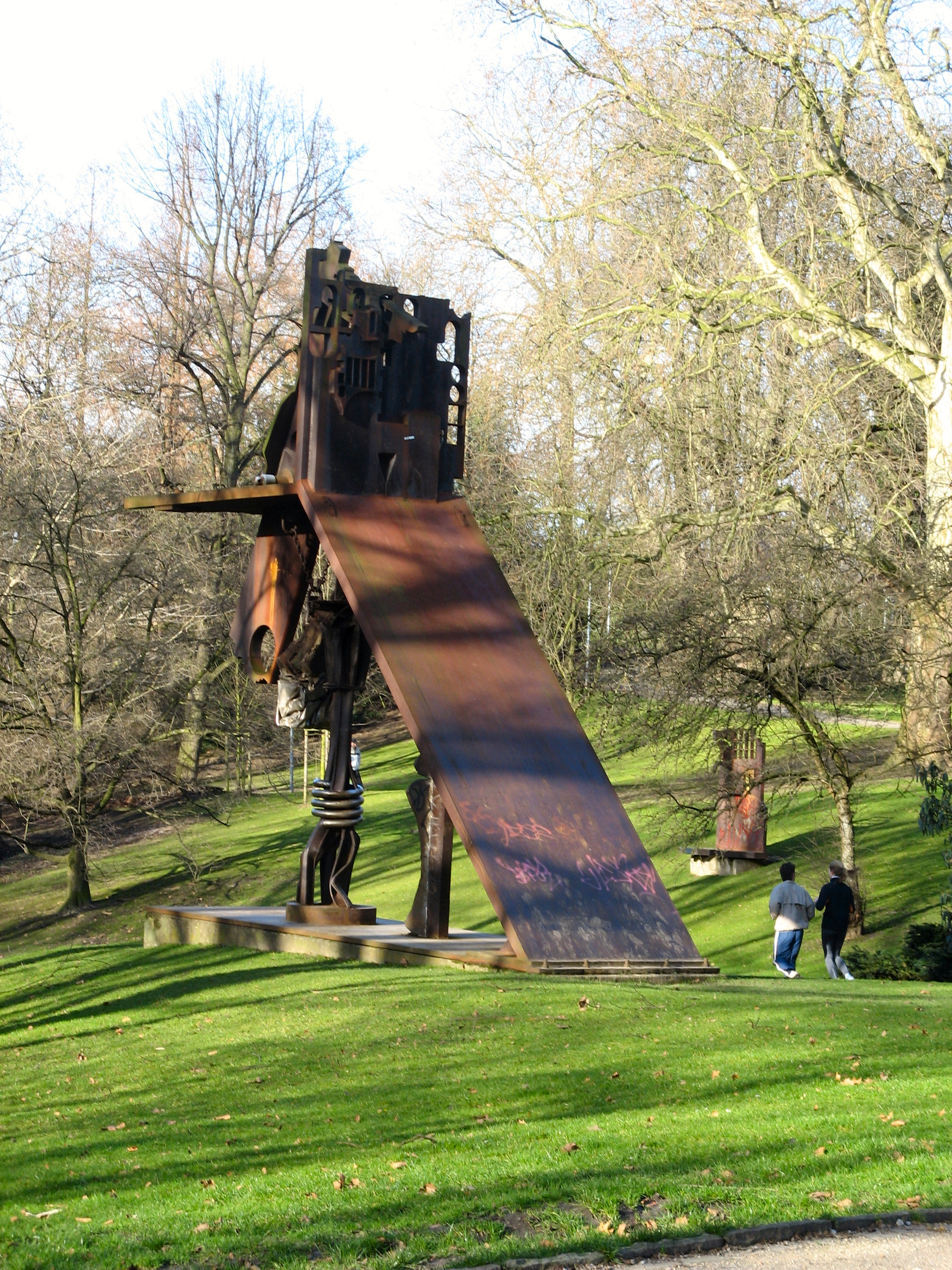
Aleš Veselý, Iron report (1979), Bochum

Between 1953 and 1956, during his annual months-long stays in Sihelné, Aleš Veselý created hundreds of landscape drawings and psychological studies of the local inhabitants. Until 1959, his paintings, woodcuts and drawings featured spiritual landscapes and ghostly apparitions into which he transformed his life experiences and personal myths. From 1959 he began to use natural materials such as stones, clay, sand and leaves in his entirely abstract paintings (the "Magma" series) and later also used found metal objects, which he fused with synthetic resin and treated with flame.

At the end of the 1950s, Aleš Veselý was one of the most significant protagonists of the Czech Informel – a wave of abstract expression that responded to the social atmosphere and the Stalinist rape of art by turning to purely subjective work with a strong existential subtext. The work of the time was sharply opposed to the officially supported socialist realism and, with its reference to medieval mysticism and expressiveness, drew on the older tradition of Czech art from the Gothic through the Baroque to Surrealism.

The source of abstraction was not a gradual simplification of the seen reality or an immediate record of intimate feelings as in the case of tachism or so-called action painting. Abstraction, as understood by the creators of Czech Informel, started from nothing, it did not depict anything, but the work itself represented a new reality and the meaning resided in him alone. The artwork was an objectification of the artist's entire personality, a "psychophysical field" transformed into the surface of a painting or a three-dimensional object. The material objects, using the principle of assemblage, were deliberately non-colourful (a predominance of black, brown and natural colours of raw materials), made up of unusual materials (metal sheets, wood, textiles, plastic, asphalt, etc.), which were brutally destroyed and joined together with synthetic resin. The objects thus acquired an emotional urgency and the character of magical objects as if marked by the patina of time. The artist's intention was not a new aesthetic appreciation of these materials, devoid of their own content or value, but to use them to emphasize the underlying message.

Between 1961 and 1963, a series of Stigmatic Objects were created – assemblage reliefs made of wood and metal, joined with synthetic resin and welding, which depict deep wounds and scars and are an expression of mental trauma rather than a physical wound. After the first exhibition, Aleš Veselý had the opportunity to realise the relief object Indetermination of the Circle and the Line for the Czech Airlines in Rome in 1964. This was followed by mostly welded Enigmatic Objects, some of which were intended as sculptures for open space. His Enigma of the Circle was installed in the old airport building in Prague-Ruzyně (1965).

Parallel to the paintings and sculptures, numerous prints and paintings were created. At the beginning of the 1960s, mainly structural etchings and combinations of etchings with impressions of real objects (1962–1963), in the second half of the 1960s large-scale impressions of assemblages of metal objects in high relief, with traces of rust and dust (Untitled imprints). His abstract oil paintings from 1960 to 1962 were titled Destruction of Hidden Intentions. Drawing studies for iron and concrete projects in the landscape, huge terraced phantastic buildings and a series of phantasmagoric drawings date from 1967 to 1970 (Martyrium, Inferno, Plague Column, Singing of Apocalyptic Birds, etc.).

In the second half of the 1960s, the imaginative and existential component of Aleš Veselý's work became stronger. In 1965, his Chair – Usurper was awarded the Critics' Prize at the Biennale de Paris. The participation of the subconscious in the creative process is here a source of meaningful ambivalence – the chair is both a tortured victim and a personification of the aggressive forces of destruction. According to the author, the detailed elaboration of the smaller sculptural objects concealed the danger that ornamentation would prevail and the power of expression would be lost. For this reason, the experience he gained during the Symposium of Spatial Forms in Ostrava, while working on the monumental sculpture Kaddish, was crucial for him. He realised that the large size suited him, freeing his imagination and allowing him to concentrate even in the busy traffic of the factory hall. At the same time, he came to terms with the necessity of working together with the welder who helped him in the realisation. The Kaddish sculpture was at the beginning of his later designs for large-scale sculptures and environmental projects.

From the early 1970s onwards, he retreated into private life for long periods. He found refuge in Středokluky near Prague, where he bought a demolished mill in which he built a rural studio. During the second half of the 1970s, he created a number of expressive sculptural objects in the form of "Spatial Records" as welded assemblages of used metal and wooden parts (Chairs, Seats, Beds, Wagons, etc.). Around the house, an exhibition of his exterior sculptures was created, conceived directly for a specific location. In the late 1970s and early 1980s he managed to realize several monumental sculptures in public spaces in Germany (Bochum, Ed Spranger School, Hamm). In Středokluky these were followed by the large-scale sculptures Basis (720 cm), 1982–1983 and Space point (1982–1990). The unrealised project of a giant arm with a spring and weight for the city of Hattingen, which was also conceived as a sound generator, was at the beginning of the next phase of his work in the 1980s. A continued interest in music and activity in the group "Frog Slime" resulted in his own sound recording "Sounds of Sculptures" (1983).

In the 1980s, Aleš Veselý created a series of large-scale studies in the form of "drawings by painting" on paper, which he regarded as complete works in their own right. In them he designed various, in general difficult to realise, giant buildings and sculptures. In the drawings, the principle of giant mechanisms that mediate the gravitational action of suspended loads and pendulums and counterbalance the tension of massive springs with rods, levers and arms of pendulums begins to emerge. The designs include sculptures incorporating natural rough stones and tree trunks (Tree Trunk Through the Big Wheel, 1993), giant compasses describing a trace in the landscape (1984), or large wheels that are prevented from moving by their associated load or asymmetrical anchorage. In the early 1990s, he first designed in drawings and later partially realized a series of gates and corridors in which passage is threatened or impeded by a suspended burden or a pile of stones. (Passage under a boulder, 1991, Passage through an avalanche, 1991–1992, Three gates for Pinkas's alley, 2004–2005). From 1991 there is also Cage (National Gallery in Prague), in which a huge steel plate is held by springs inside a rectangular structure made of wooden logs.

A personal experience with Eastern culture, first in Seoul (1988) and later in Japan (Double Bench, Tokyo, 1994), as well as a trip to Israel and a stay and exhibition in Chicago (1994) marked a certain shift in Aleš Veselý's work towards environmental projects. Some of his designs are conceived as monumental interventions in the landscape that could only be observed from a high perspective (Mountain of Mountains, 2000–2003, Desert Project, 2005). A constant subject of thought for Aleš Veselý has been the theme of gravity. Already the Kaddish sculpture was created in such a way that the main mass of the sculpture rested on high and relatively thin supports. During his stay in Philadelphia (1993), he designed a project in which a series of suspended transparent textile sheets with silk screen printing created the illusion of a huge boulder floating in space. In his later sculpture designs, he sought means of lifting the large mass of stone to a height and fixing it in such a way as to emphasise the effect of its weight (Hovering Rock, an idea for a desert project, 1995, Rock for One, 1997, Lake Sculptures, 2003, Kadesh Barnea Monument, 2005, Mobile Babel, 2005, The Law of Irreversibility, 2015).

Starting with the project Chamber of Light (1998–2000) in Vilnius and the design of the project Big Mirror (2000) for Oda Park in the Netherlands, Aleš Veselý often used the phenomenon of mirroring in his sculptures (Touches and distance, Brno, 2010, Entrance to the Law, Gallery of Central Bohemian Region, Kutná Hora, 2014).

A characteristic feature of Aleš Veselý's work is his striving for precision of expression. As he himself states in the interview, the definitiveness of the final form is subject to a heightened sensibility and capacity for reflection. An essential part of the process is continuous personal participation and the possibility to make changes up to the last moment, regardless of the complexity of the project. For the objects that were created in his studio, he considered the ideal state to be one where, without a specific intention to create a particular work of art, everything he touched was done in a state close to unconsciousness or nirvana.

His sculptures have been placed in public spaces around the world (Olympic Park, Seoul; Faret Tachikawa, Tokyo; Terezín; Europos Parkas, Vilnius, Lithuania; Wijk aan Zee, Netherlands, Bochum, Hamm, Germany). The studio in Středokluky became a unique sculpture park during Aleš Veselý's lifetime, which should be perceived as a total work of art.

=== Sculptures in public space ===
- 2015 Gate of No Return, Memorial of Silence, Prague Bubny
- 2015 The Law of Irreversibility, Terezín Crematorium
- 2014 Entry into the Law, Gallery of the Central Bohemian Region in Kutná Hora
- 2010 Distance and Touches, Masaryk University in Brno, stainless steel, stone, 300×560×150 cm
- 1998–2001 Chamber of Light, Europos Parkas, Vilnius, iron, steel and boulders, 777×430×430 cm
- 2008 Holocaust Memorial, in front of the former synagogue in Kutná Hora, stone, stainless steel, iron, 200×200×200 cm
- 1999 Messenger, Sculpture Park, Wijk aan Zee, steel and boulders, 530×376×609 cm
- 1996 Memento, sculpture from 1968 permanently installed in Venray, stainless steel, h. 450 cm
- 1995 Magen David, Terezín Memorial, stainless steel, bronzed railway tracks, boulders, h. 560 cm
- 1994 Doublebench, Faret Tachikawa, Tokyo, stainless steel, diorite, 240 × 240 × 70 cm
- 1988 Testimony, 1968 sculpture permanently installed in the Olympic Park in Seoul, stainless steel, h. 280 cm
- 1980 Ten, welded stainless steel statue in front of Ed. Spranger, Hamm, h. 12 m
- 1979 Iron Report, city park, Bochum, set of three iron sculptures, I. 750 × 900 × 220 cm, II. 330 × 360 × 180 cm, III. 280 × 220 × 110 cm
- 1973 Oven from Jericho, Nové Sedlo near Karlovy Vary, stainless steel, 210 × 390 × 230 cm
- 1967–68 Kaddish, (originally in Ostrava) from 1971 sculpture placed in the artist's studio in Středokluky, welded stainless steel, h. 710 cm
- 1965 Enigma of the Circle, Old Airport, Prague Ruzyně
- 1963 Indetermination of the Circle and Straight Line, CSA, via Bissolati, Rome, wood, iron and acronex (destroyed in 1994 with the knowledge of the Czech Embassy)

=== Gate of No return ===
On 9 March 2015, a large sculpture entitled Gate of no return by Aleš Veselý was unveiled at Prague-Bubny railway station in the form of a 20-metre rail raised to the sky (symbolizing Jacob's Ladder). The date of the unveiling of this installation is also a reminder of the night of 8–9 March 1944, when almost 4,000 prisoners of the so-called Terezín family camp were murdered in Oswiecim. The giant artefact stands at the site of the Jewish transports as a gate on the road through which they passed to the deportation trains. The sculpture carries the message that the station, marked by the tragic fate of Prague Jews (from here 50,000 Jewish citizens of Prague were deported to the Theresienstadt Ghetto and other concentration camps between 1941 and 1945), is ready for its planned reconstruction into a Memorial of Silence as a memorial to the victims of the Holocaust.

=== Representation in collections ===
- Guggenheim Museum, New York, USA
- Centre Georges Pompidou, Paris, France
- Galleria degli Uffizi, Firenze, Italy
- Sculpture Collection – Olympic Park, Seoul, South Korea
- Runnymede Sculpture Farm, Woodside, California, USA
- Albertina, Vienna, Austria
- Museum Folkwang, Essen, Germany
- Museum Bochum, Germany
- Gustav-Lübcke-Museum, Hamm, Germany
- French National Library, Paris, France
- Museum of Central Pomerania, Słupsk, Poland
- National Gallery, Prague
- Central European Forum Olomouc
- Prague City Gallery
- Museum of the Capital City of Prague
- Jewish Museum, Prague
- Czech Museum of Fine Arts in Prague
- Museum Kampa, Prague
- Galerie Zlatá Husa, Prague
- Moravian Gallery in Brno
- Museum of Fine Arts, Olomouc
- Regional galleries: Hradec Králové, Hluboká nad Vltavou, Cheb, Klatovy-Klenová, Liberec, Louny, Ostrava, Pardubice, Plzeň, Roudnice nad Labem, Ostrov nad Ohří, Terezín
- Private collections: USA, Canada, Japan, Israel, Germany, France, Italy, Netherlands, New Zealand, Austria, Czech Republic

=== Solo exhibitions (selection) ===
- 2016 No Beginning, No End – A Tribute to Aleš Veselý, Museum Kampa, Prague 1, 2–28 February 2016
- 2015 four exhibitions on the artist's life anniversary Ales Vesely / No beginning, no end
  - 1 Unknown Objects from the 1960s to Today, Gallery 1st Floor, Prague, 3 September – 11 November 2015
  - 2 Graphics – Non-graphics (1960s, 1970s), Millennium Gallery, Prague, 11 September 2015 – 11 October 2015
  - 3 Visions and ideas from the last years, Villa Pellé Gallery, Prague, 18 September – 11 November 2015
  - 4 Ideal projects realized and unrealized, Galerie Zlatá husa, Prague, 30 September – 30 October 2015
- 2012 Codes and Intermingling, Karlovy Vary Art Gallery, Karlovy Vary
- 2011 Duration and Settling, DOX Centre for Contemporary Art, Prague
- 2010 Aleš Veselý: Disproportion of Dimensions – Fragments of Records, Smečky Gallery, Prague
- 2009 Aleš Veselý in Josef Pleskot's Spaces, Litomyšl
- 2007 Aleš Veselý, East Bohemian Gallery, Pardubice
- 2007 Aleš Veselý, Klatovy/Klenová Gallery, Klenová
- 2007 Older Objects and New Projects, West Bohemian Gallery, Plzeň
- 2006/07 Aleš Veselý, Zlatá Husa Gallery, Prague
- 2005/06 Selected works from 1959–2005, Egon Schiele Art Centre, Český Krumlov
- 2003 Infinite Point, Carosso Fine Art, New York, USA
- 2000 Big Mirror – Exhibition of a Landscape-Sculpture Project, Oda Park, Venray, Netherlands
- 2000 Utopie und Reflexion, Panorama Museum, Bad Frankenhausen, Germany
- 2000 Drawings and Projects, Gallery of Fine Arts, Litoměřice
- 1999 Obsession – Reality – Utopia, State Gallery of Fine Arts, Ostrava
- 1998 New Drawings for Sculptures Chicago, International Currents Gallery – J.D. Mooney Foundation, USA
- 1995 Messengers, International Currents Gallery – J.D. Mooney Foundation, Chicago, IL., USA
- 1994 Chicago International Art Exhibition, Chicago, IL., USA
- 1993 Fabric Workshop and Museum, Philadelphia, PA., USA
- 1993 Deutsch-deutsches Museum, Mödlareuth, Germany
- 1993 Galerie Christoph Dürr, Munich, Germany
- 1992 Central European Gallery and Publishing House, Prague
- 1992 Aleš Veselý: Point of Limit, Ballrooom of the Prague Castle
- 1990 Aleš Veselý, Nová síň, Prague, 4 June – 1 July 1990
- 1990 Cultural Centre Opatov, Prague
- 1988 Batuz Foundation, Schloss Schaumburg
- 1985 Drawings by Painting, Institute of Macromolecular Chemistry of the Czechoslovak Academy of Sciences, Prague
- 1984 The Melon Palace, Prague
- 1980 Gustav-Lübcke-museum, Hamm, Germany
- 1970 State Jewish Museum, Prague
- 1969 Wiener Secession, Vienna, Austria
- 1965 Regional Gallery, Liberec
- 1963 Stigmatic Objects, Alšova síň, Prague

==== Works by Aleš Veselý in the Sculpture park of the National Gallery in Prague ====
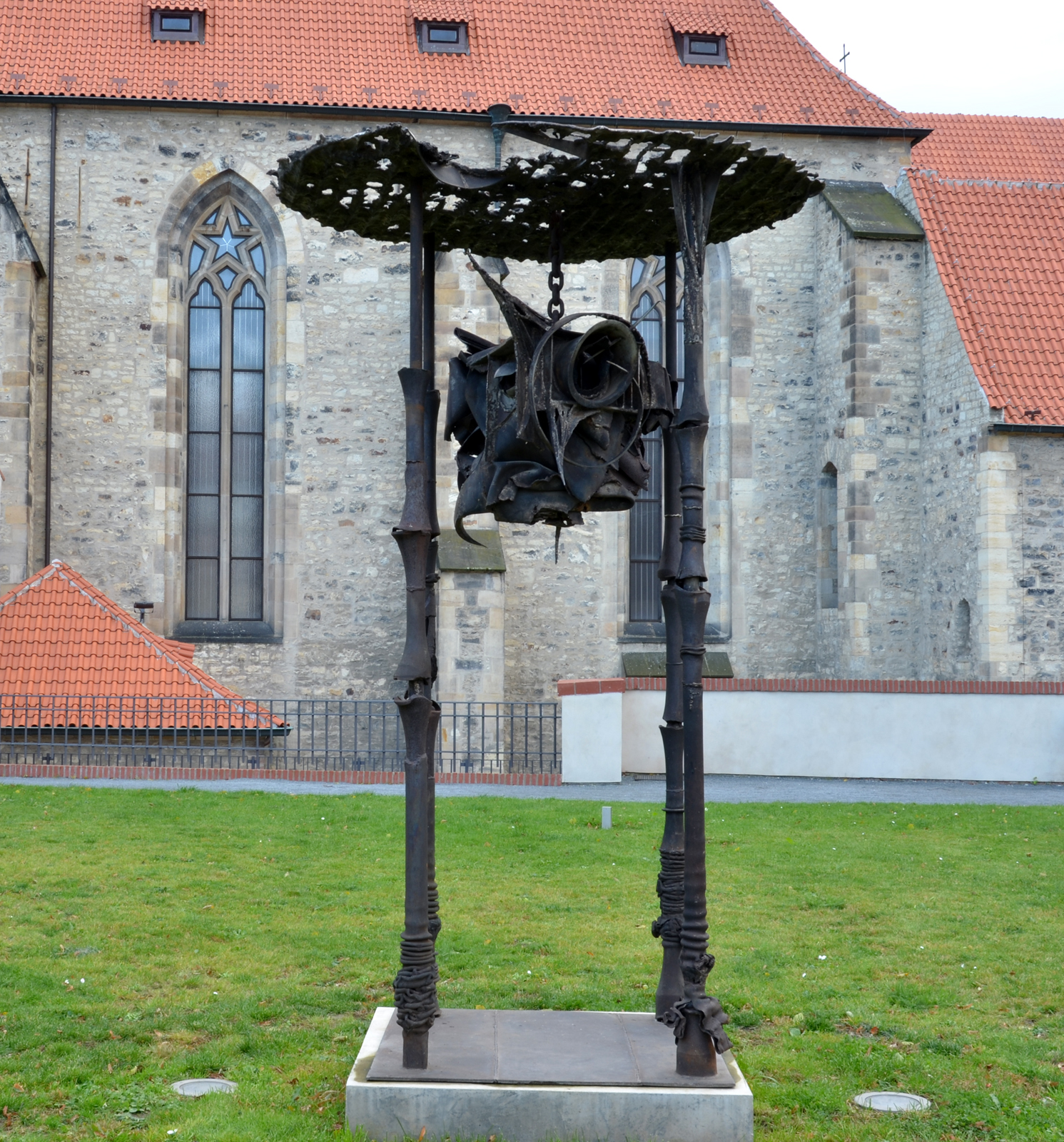
Aleš Veselý, Suspended Weight, 1968

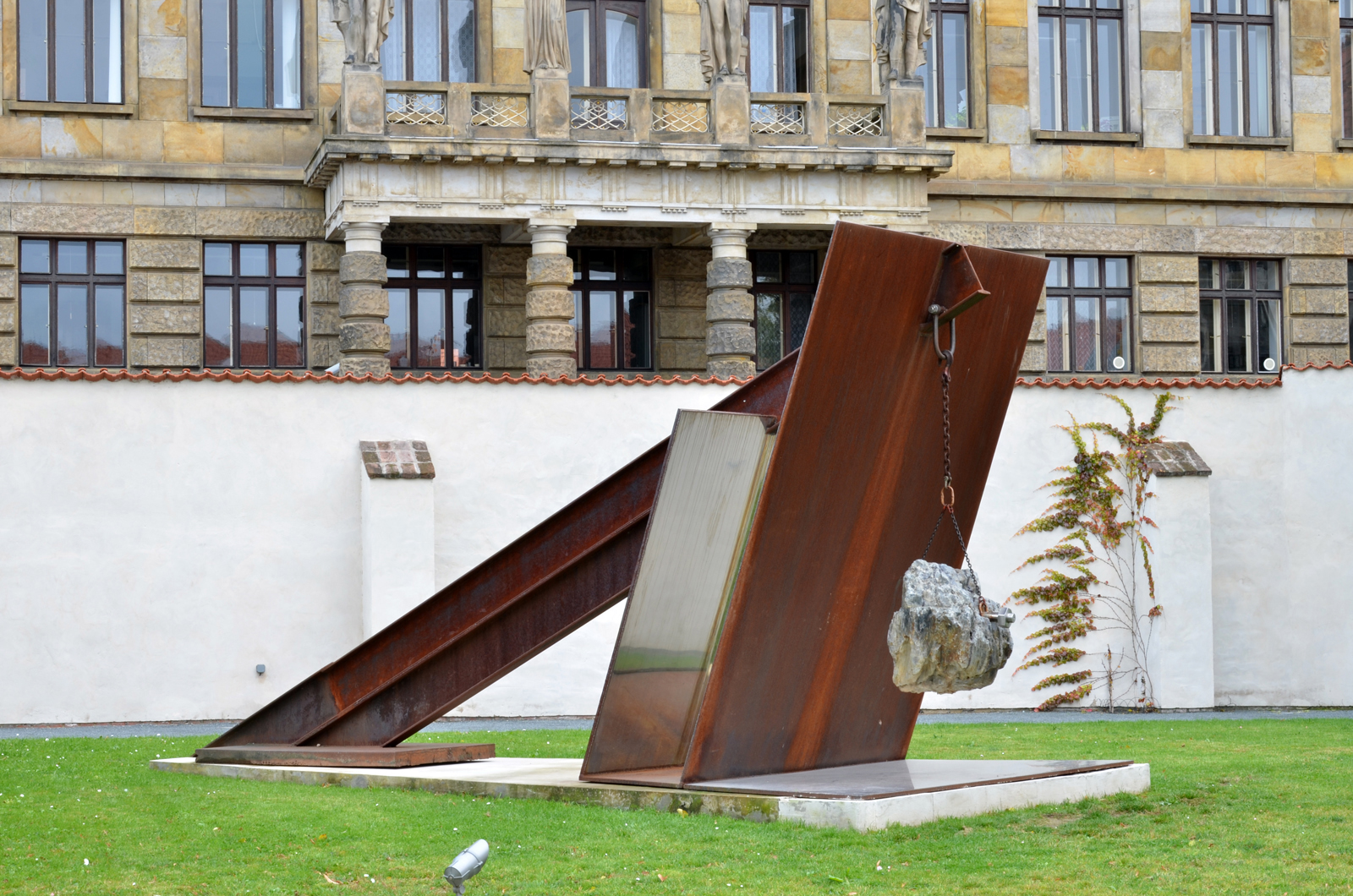
Aleš Veselý, Skewed Cross-Section of a Skewed Axis, 1992–2009

== Sources ==
=== Catalogues ===
- Ales Vesely, 1963, Šmejkal F, cat. 8 p., ČFVU Praha
- Aleš Veselý: 35 drawings, Hartmann A, cat. 8 p., Spanish Synagogue, Prague 1970
- Aleš Veselý: Zeichnungen, Wille Hans, cat. 24 p., Gustav-Lübcke-Museum, Hamm 1980
- Aleš Veselý: Colour drawings – sketches – plastic objects. Working exhibition as an attempt at information, 1984, Erben V et al., cat. 284 p., House at the Golden Melon, Prague 1984
- Aleš Veselý, Juříková M, Klimešová M, cat. 2 p., Opatov gallery 1986
- Ales Vesely, Rousová Hana, cat. 2 p., Galerie 55, Kladno 1987
- Aleš Veselý, Mládková Meda, Ronte Dieter, cat. 18 p., for exhibitions in Buenos Aires and Schaumburg, 1988
- Aleš Veselý, Raimanová Ivona, cat. 28 p., for exhibitions in the New Hall, GVU Kladno 1990
- Aleš Veselý : Point of Limit, Messer T et al., exhibition catalogue (96 p.), Prague Castle, Prague, 1992
- Aleš Veselý: Obsession, Reality, Utopia, Hlaváček J et al., cat. 80 p., OGV Jihlava 1998
- Aleš Veselý : Infinite Point, Kotík Charlotta et al., exhibition catalogue (88 p.), Carosso Fine Art, New York 2003, ISBN 0-9729357-1-1
- Aleš Veselý: Tři brány / Three gates, Hájková M, Pavlát L, cat. 32 p., Robert Guttmann Gallery, Prague 2005
- Aleš Veselý, Machalický J, cat. 12 p., Museum Montanelli, s.r.o., Praha 2006
- Ales Vesely: New Projects and Older Objects (1957–2007), Neumann I, cat. 40 p., West Bohemian Gallery in Plzeň 2007, ISBN 978-80-86415-50-5
- Aleš Veselý: Litomyšl 2009, Netopil P et al., cat. 100 p., Smetanova Litomyšl, o.p.s., Litomyšl 2009 ISBN 978-80-904919-0-8
- Aleš Veselý: Disproportion of Dimensions – Fragments of Records, Hubáčková V, cat. 16 p., Gallery, spol. s r.o. (Jaroslav Kořán), Prague 2010
- Aleš Veselý: Trvání a setrvání / Permanence and inertia, cat. 6 p., DOX, Centre for Contemporary Art, Prague 2011
- Aleš Veselý: Bez začátku, bez konce / Without Beginning, Without End, catalogue for the anniversary exhibitions of Galerie Millenium, Gallery 1st Floor, Galerie Zlatá Husa, Vila Pellé, Prague 2015

=== Other ===
- Quatrième biennale de Paris, 1965, Šerých Jaroslav, cat. collective, 207 p., IV. Biennale de Paris, Musée d'Art Moderne de la Ville de Paris (ARC)
- Sculpture and the City, 1969, Moulis J et al., 114 p., Secretariat of the exhibition Sculpture and the City, Liberec
- Mahulena Nešlehová (ed.), Czech Informel. Pioneers of Abstraction 1957–1964, Prague City Gallery 1991
- Restany Pierre: Aleš Veselý, Visionnaire de la modernité industrielle / Aleš Veselý a visionary of industrial modernity, Galerie Pallas, 1994
- Michal Schonberg, Walk through the gate! Interviews with Aleš Veselý, Torst.
- Marcel Fišer, Art Symposia in the 1960s, dissertation, Faculty of Arts and UDU, Charles University Prague 2011
