= Phila =

Phila most often refers to a shortened name for the City of Philadelphia, U.S.

It may also refer to:

- Phila of Elimeia, sister of Derdas and wife of Philip II of Macedon
- Phila (daughter of Antipater), wife of Balacrus, Craterus and significantly Demetrius I of Macedon
- Phila (daughter of Seleucus), wife of Antigonus Gonatas
- Phila (daughter of Theodorus), daughter of Theodorus of Athamania
- Phila of Thebes, courtesan
- Phila (Pieria), ancient town in Pieria, Macedonia kingdom

== See also ==
- Fila (disambiguation)
- Philia Greek Philosophy
