= Příbram na Moravě =

- Municipality
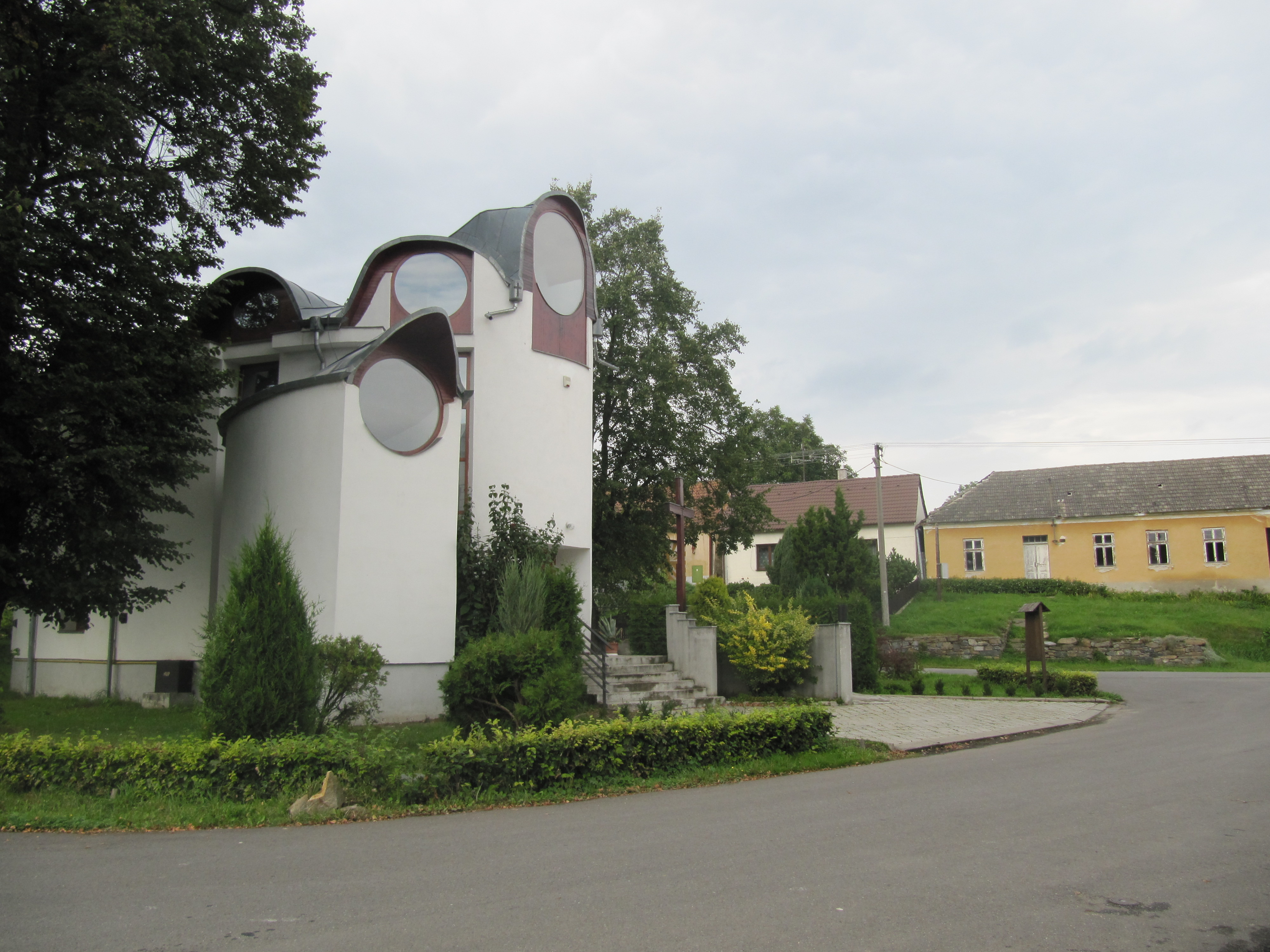
- Chapel of Saint Florian

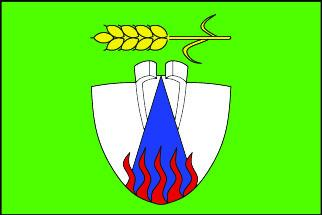
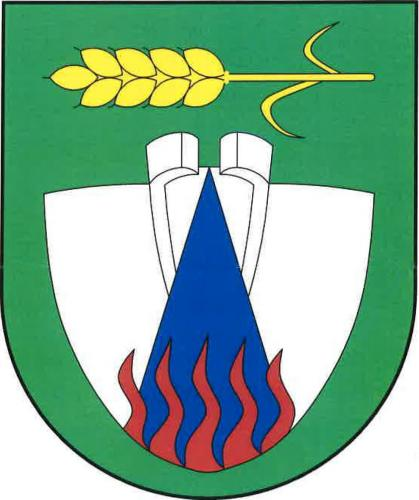
- Flag Coat of arms

- Location in the Czech Republic
- Coordinates: 49°11′44″N 16°17′57″E
- Country: Czech Republic
- Region: South Moravian
- District: Brno-Country
- First mentioned: 1237

Area
  - Total: 11.92 km^{2} (4.60 sq mi)
- Elevation: 440 m (1,440 ft)

Population (2026-01-01)
  - Total: 654
  - Density: 54.9/km^{2} (142/sq mi)
- Time zone: UTC+1 (CET)
  - Summer (DST): UTC+2 (CEST)
- Postal code: 664 84
- Website: www.pribramnamorave.cz

Příbram na Moravě is a municipality and village in Brno-Country District in the South Moravian Region of the Czech Republic. It has about 700 inhabitants.

Příbram na Moravě lies approximately 23 kilometres (14 mi) west of Brno and 169 km (105 mi) south-east of Prague.

== Demographics ==
Historical population
Year	Pop.	±%
1869	595	—
1880	654	+9.9%
1890	770	+17.7%
1900	894	+16.1%
1910	1,049	+17.3%
1921	1,065	+1.5%
1930	1,066	+0.1%
1950	989	−7.2%
1961	988	−0.1%
1970	909	−8.0%
1980	758	−16.6%
1991	609	−19.7%
2001	545	−10.5%
2011	559	+2.6%
2021	646	+15.6%
Source: Censuses
