= Primera Fila =

Primera Fila (English: Front row/First row) is a Sony Music album series and it may refer to:

- Primera Fila (Vicente Fernández album), 2008
- Primera Fila (Thalía album), 2009
- Primera Fila, a 2010 album by Mexican group OV7
- Primera Fila, a 2011 album by Argentinean singer-songwriter Miguel Mateos
- En Primera Fila, a 2011 album by Venezuelan singer-songwriter Franco De Vita
  - Vuelve en Primera Fila, a 2013 album by De Vita
- Primera Fila, a 2012 by Italian singer Gigi D'Alessio
- Primera Fila: Sasha Benny Erik, a 2012 album by Mexican singers Sasha Sokol, Benny Ibarra and Erik Rubin
- Primera Fila (Fey album), 2012
- Primera Fila, a 2013 album by Spanish band La Oreja de Van Gogh
- En Primera Fila: Día 1, a 2013 album by Mexican singer Cristian Castro
  - Primera Fila: Dia 2, a 2014 album by Castro
- La Guzmán: Primera Fila, a 2013 album by Mexican singer Alejandra Guzmán
- Primera Fila Flans, a 2014 album by Ivonne, Ilse, and Mimí, a Mexican group formerly known as Flans
- Primera Fila: Hecho Realidad, a 2014 album by American duo Ha*Ash
- Primera Fila, a 2015 album by Las Tres Grandes (composed of Guadalupe Pineda, Tania Libertad and Eugenia León)
- Roberto Carlos – Primera Fila, a 2015 album by Brazilian singer Roberto Carlos
- Primera Fila (Bronco album), a 2017 album by Mexican band Bronco
- Primera fila: Una Última Vez (Encore), a 2017 album by Mexican band Sin Bandera
- Primera Fila, a 2017 album by Mexican singer Yuri
- Primera Fila: Desierto, a 2017 album by Mexican singer Yuridia

== See also ==
- Primera Fila, a Spanish television program broadcast by TVE, which ran from 1962-1965
