= Marek Fila =

Slovak mathematician (1959–2023)

- Born: 29 August 1959; Bratislava, Czechoslovakia
- Died: 20 April 2023 (aged 63); Bratislava, Slovakia
- Occupation: Professor of Mathematics
- Children: 2, including Lukáš Fila
- Parent(s): Rudolf Fila; Dorota Filová

Academic background
- Education: Comenius University
- Doctoral advisor: Pavol Brunovský

Academic work
- Discipline: Mathematics
- Sub-discipline: Diffusion equations, partial differential equations
- Institutions: Comenius University

Marek Fila (29 August 1959 – 20 April 2023) was a Slovak mathematician. His main research focus was diffusion equations and partial differential equations. He was among the most productive scientists in Slovakia.

Fila was born in Bratislava to an artistic family. His father was the painter Rudolf Fila and his mother Dorota Filová was a well-known renovator of medieval art.

Fila studied Mathematics at the Comenius University, graduating in 1989. His doctoral advisor was Pavol Brunovský. Following his graduation, he remained at the university and became a full professor in 2008. In the 1990s, he was a visiting researcher at the Iowa State University and later a recurrent visitor at the University of Tokyo. He founded the Department of Applied Mathematics and Statistics at the Faculty of Mathematics and Physics of the Comenius University and led it for 11 years.

Fila had two children; son Lukáš Fila, who is a journalist and musician, and daughter Natália, who is an architect.

Fila's death was announced by his department on the faculty website on 23 April 2023.
