= Rudolf Fila =

Slovak painter, educator and author (1932–2015)

- Born: 19 July 1932; Příbram na Moravě, Czechoslovakia
- Died: 11 February 2015; Bratislava, Slovakia
- Occupation(s): Painter, Educator, Author
- Spouse: Dorota Filová
- Children: Marek Fila; Vít Fila

Rudolf Fila (19 July 1932 – 11 February 2015) was a Czechoslovak and Slovak painter, educator and author, best known for his artistic reinterpretations of the works of Gustav Klimt.

Fila was born in Příbram na Moravě (Moravia) and resided in Bratislava, Slovakia.

With his wife, the art renovator Dorota Filová he had two sons – Vít Fila and the mathematician Marek Fila.

== History ==
- 1950–1952: Attended the School of Applied Art in Brno
- 1952–1958: Attended the Academy of Fine Arts in Bratislava
- 1960: began teaching at the High School for Applied Art in Bratislava
- 1960s: Represented at international exhibitions
- 1971: Exhibition in Zürich
- 1990: moved to the Academy of Fine Arts in Bratislava
- 1993–1996: Exhibitions in Vienna, Budapest, Warsaw, Ulm, Châteauroux, London, Novara and Paris

== Art ==
Fila's works are represented in the collections of the Slovak National Gallery, the National Gallery in Prague, the Museum of the 20th Century in Vienna, the permanent exhibition of the Credit Suisse Art Collection in London and other cities in Europe and the United States.

== Publications ==
- Fila, Rudolf (2003). cestou (in Slovak). Bratislava, Slovakia: Petrus. ISBN 80-88939-58-5.
- Fila, Rudolf and Filová, Dorota (2005). Premeny: Kópie, citácie, premaľby (in Slovak). Bratislava, Slovakia: Petrus. ISBN 80-88939-55-0.
