= Vozniak =

Vozniak is a surname. Notable people with the surname include:

- Ihor Vozniak (born 1951), Ukrainian archbishop
- Jaroslav Vožniak (1933–2005), Czech painter and printmaker
