= Jaroslav Vožniak =

Czech artist (1933–2005)

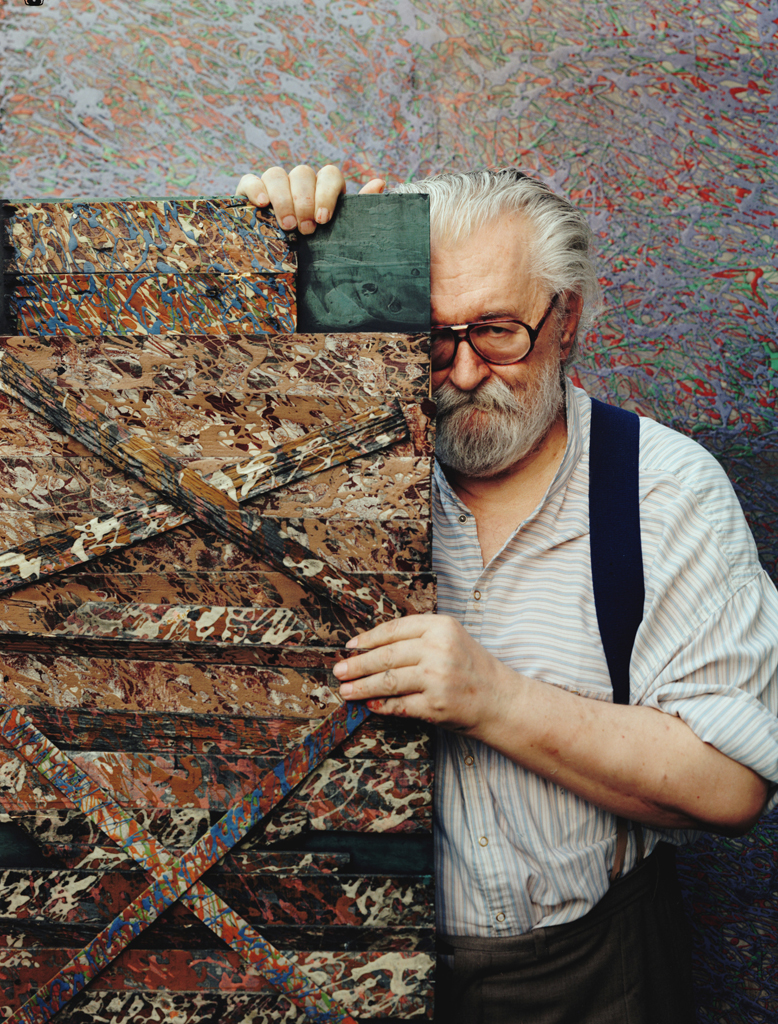
- Jaroslav Vožniak, foto Vladislav Krédl
- Born: 26 April 1933; Suchodol, Czech Republic
- Died: 12 May 2005 (aged 72); Prague
- Education: Academy of Fine Arts, Prague
- Known for: painter, printmaker
- Awards: two gold medals, International Jewellery Exhibition Jablonec 65

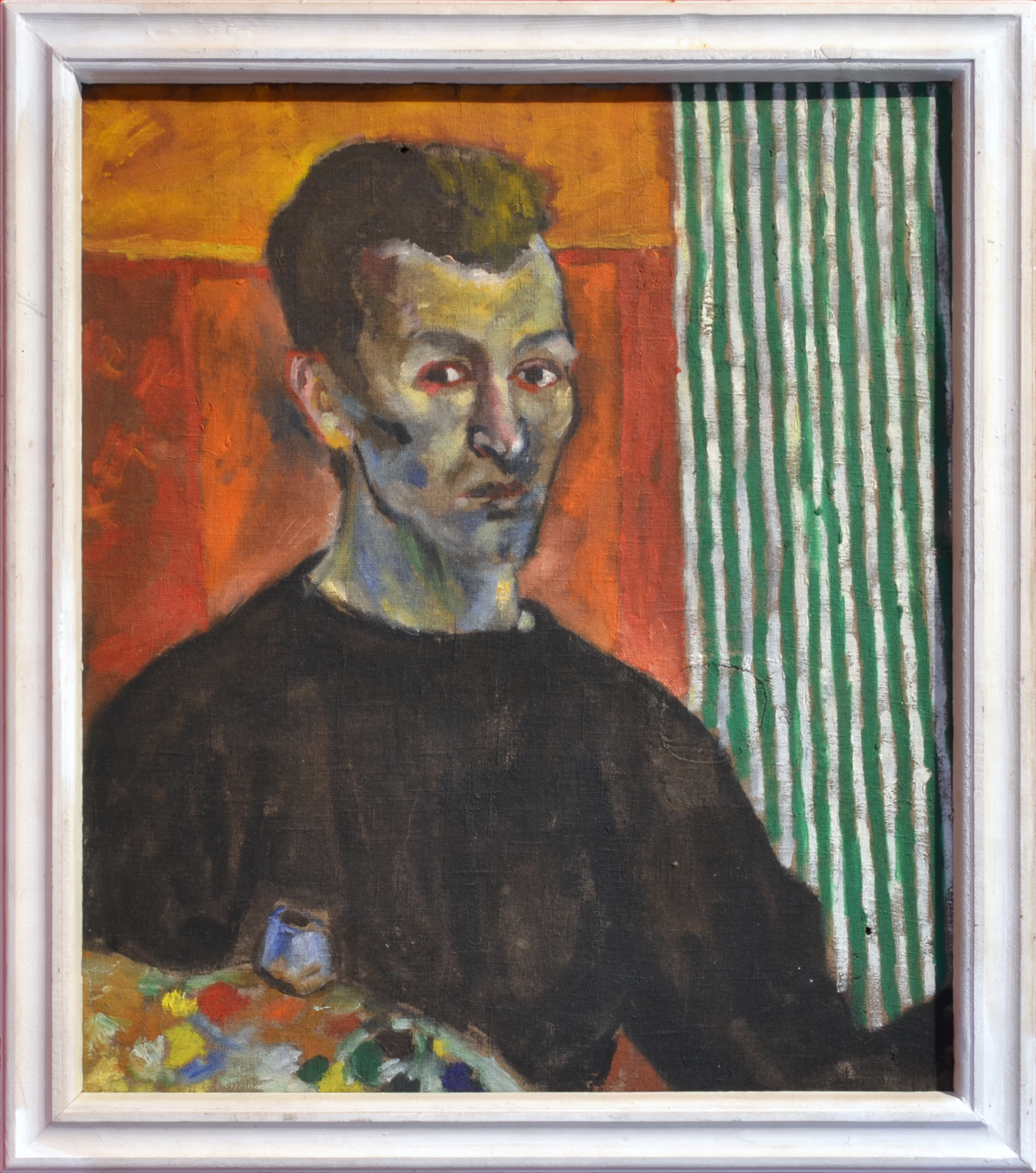
Jaroslav Vožniak, Self-Portrait (early 1950th)

Jaroslav Vožniak (26 April 1933, Suchodol - 12 May 2005, Prague) was a Czech painter and printmaker, a member of the Šmidra group of artists.

== Biography ==
Jaroslav Vožniak trained as a reproduction lithographer between 1949 and 1951. He graduated in 1952 and the same year he began his studies at the Academy of Arts and Crafts in Prague under Prof. Karel Svolinský. In 1954 he moved to the Academy of Fine Arts to the studio of Prof. Vladimir Silovský. He graduated in 1959. From 1955 he was a member of the Šmidra group. He exhibited individually from 1964 (Museum Roztoky), in joint exhibitions Object (Prague, 1965), with the Šmidra group (Ostrov nad Ohří, 1965) and with the Umělecká beseda group in Prague (1966). During the transport of paintings to the Vožniak exhibition in Roztoky (1964), the wind took the largest painting entitled Icarus (1958-1959) and carried it into the river. The damaged painting was found after many years in the attic of a house, restored in 2019-2020 and exhibited in the Gallery of Modern Art in Roudnice nad Labem in 2021.

From the early 1960s until 1965 he worked as a night watchman in the sculpture collection of the National Gallery in Zbraslav. After 1965 he collaborated with the architect Jindřich Santar, who worked in the exhibition industry (among others, he wrote the script for the Czechoslovak Pavilion at the Expo 58 in Brussels).

In 1965 Vožniak exhibited also in Kraków, at the Salon de la Jeune Peinture and at the Lambert Gallery in Paris and at the Alternative attuali in L'Aquila. In the same year he won two gold medals for his contribution to the International Jewellery Exhibition Jablonec 65.

In the second half of the 1960s, Vožniak collaborated with the state-owned Jablonec Jewellery Company and also participated in an installation at the Expo 67 in Montréal. At the turn of 1968–1969, he created a famous series of modern icons for this company, first exhibited at the Liberec Exhibition Market and later in Montréal (1969). In connection with the exhibitions, Vožniak visited Paris, Sweden, Leningrad several times and twice stayed in Canada.

During the period of the normalisation, Jaroslav Vožniak had problems with the communist regime, also because of his son, who was the drummer of the band The Plastic People of the Universe. At that time he designed diplomas and other printed materials, posters for the National Gallery and the Health Education Institute, and illustrated several books. Throughout his life he suffered from narcolepsy and was forced to take medication to concentrate on his work. Since 1980, he has been on disability pension due to his long-term adverse health condition.

With his wife Marta (* 1934) he had a son Jaroslav (* 1954) and a daughter Marta (* 1958), who is also an artist. After 1989 Jaroslav Vožniak, unlike his friends Nepraš and Dlouhý, who were appointed professors at the Academy, was no longer active in public. In Zbraslav, however, a sort of "Vožniak school" was formed around him, which included his daughter, son-in-law and daughter-in-law.

== Work ==
Vožniak 's extensive set of drawings for Dante's Divine Comedy and the New Testament, created between 1958 and 1960, was his distinctive attempt to interpret traditional themes in a modern form. The figures are radically simplified to a cone-shaped symbol dominated by large luminous eyes, the landscape is represented by a stylized desert with rocks and palm trees. The effect of the paintings is intensified by the use of sharp contrasting colours. Some motifs characteristic of other works by Vožniak appear here - the eye as the centre of the scene, a symbol of the observer and witness, as well as of the inner sight - crumbling rocks as a general symbol of the disintegration of values. At the same time, ink watercolour drawings were created, with which the painter described a kind of panopticon of freely selected characters from the real world (Genghis Khan, Savonarola, Cleopatra, Clown, etc.).

At the turn of the 1950s and 1960s, Vožniak, like most of his comrades, turned to abstraction for a time, creating a series of red compositions in which the smoothness of the painting was disrupted by interventions of engraving and scratching. What follows are abstract paintings with detailed and virtuosic drawing, whose motifs in the form of sprouts, offshoots, tubes and knife blades refer to the real world. He later set some of these drawings in black frames assembled from fragments of old carved wooden ornaments (Eggs, 1963).

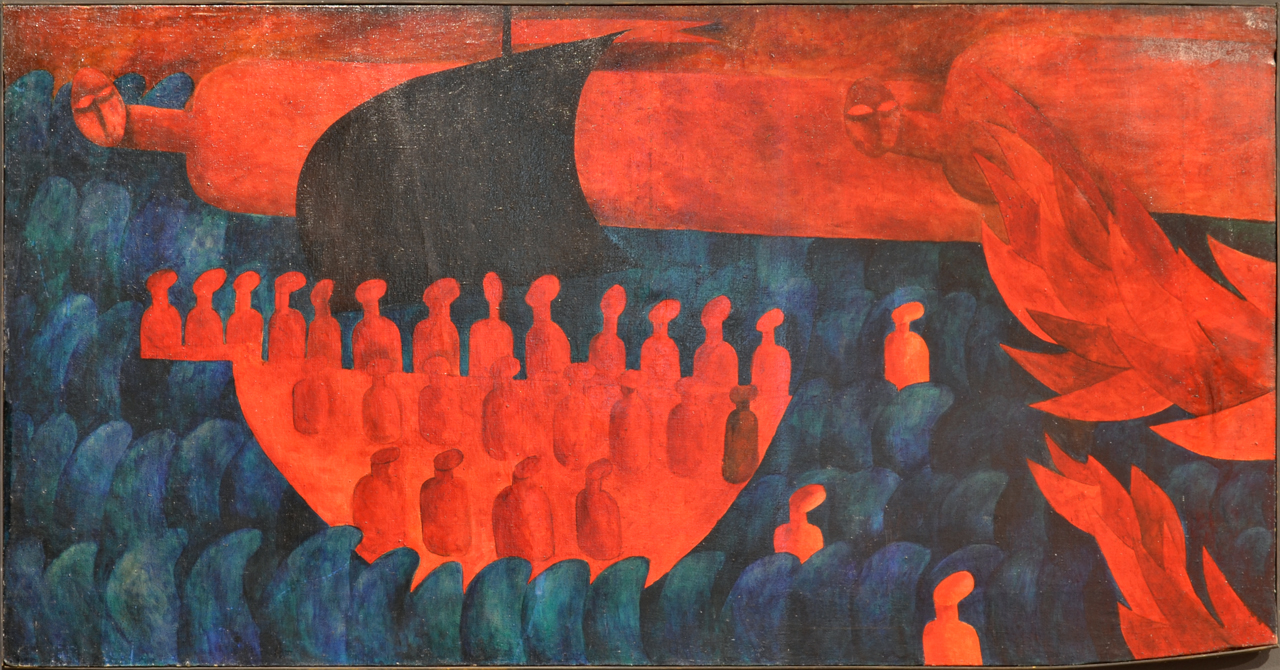
Hell, from the cycle Divine Comedy (1959), Gallery of the Central Bohemian Region in Kutná Hora

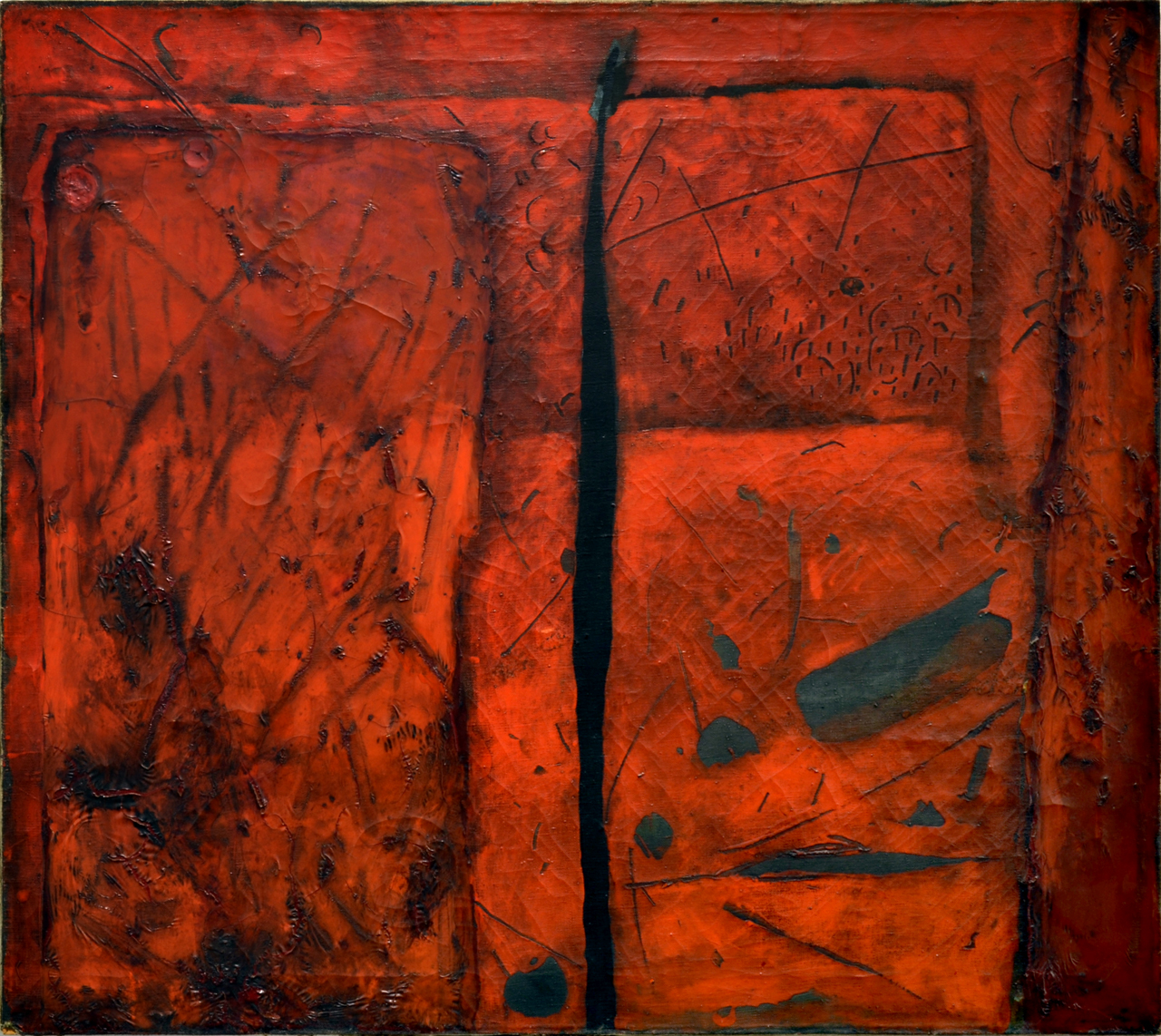
Red IV (1961), Museum Kampa

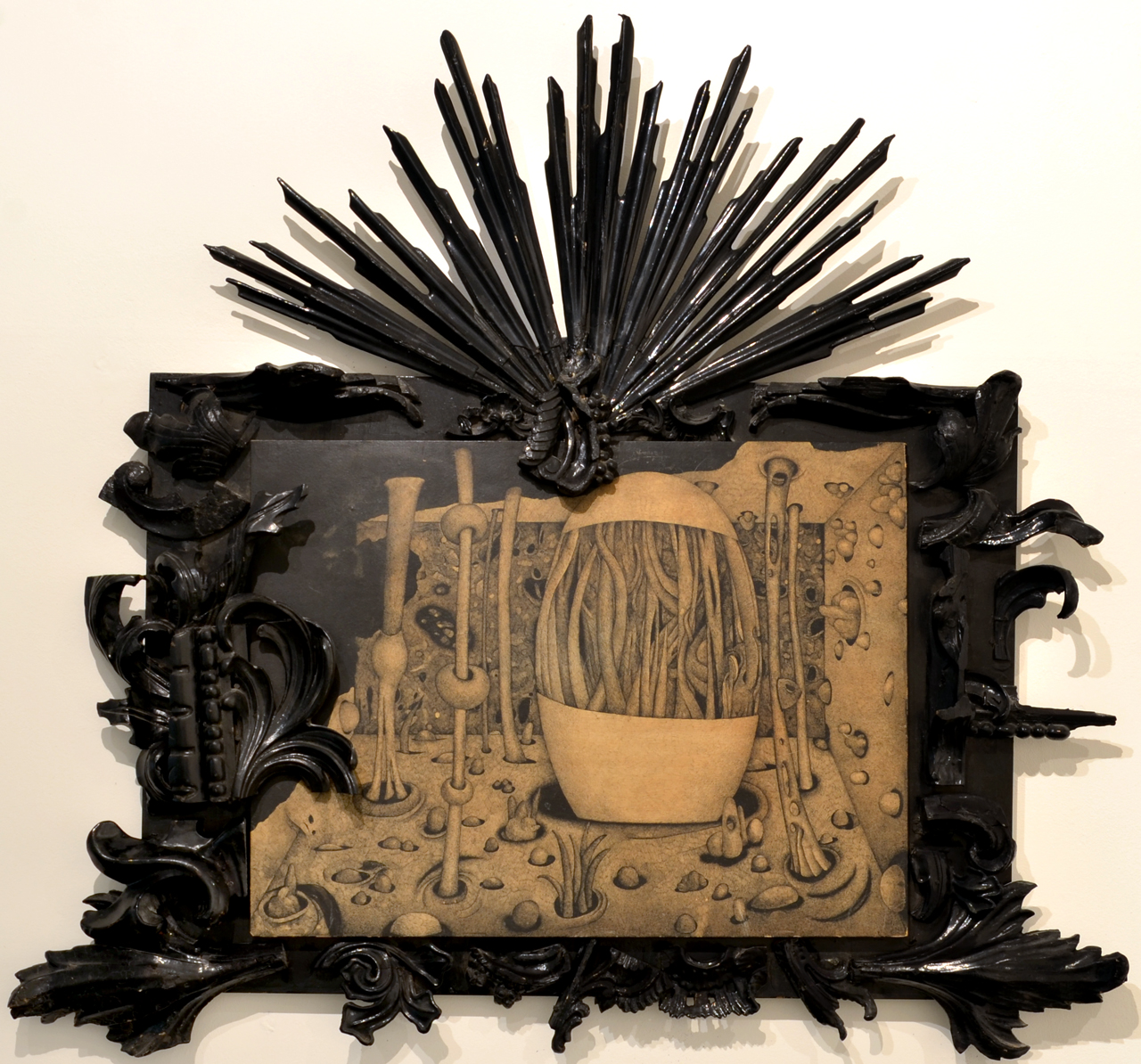
Egg (1963)

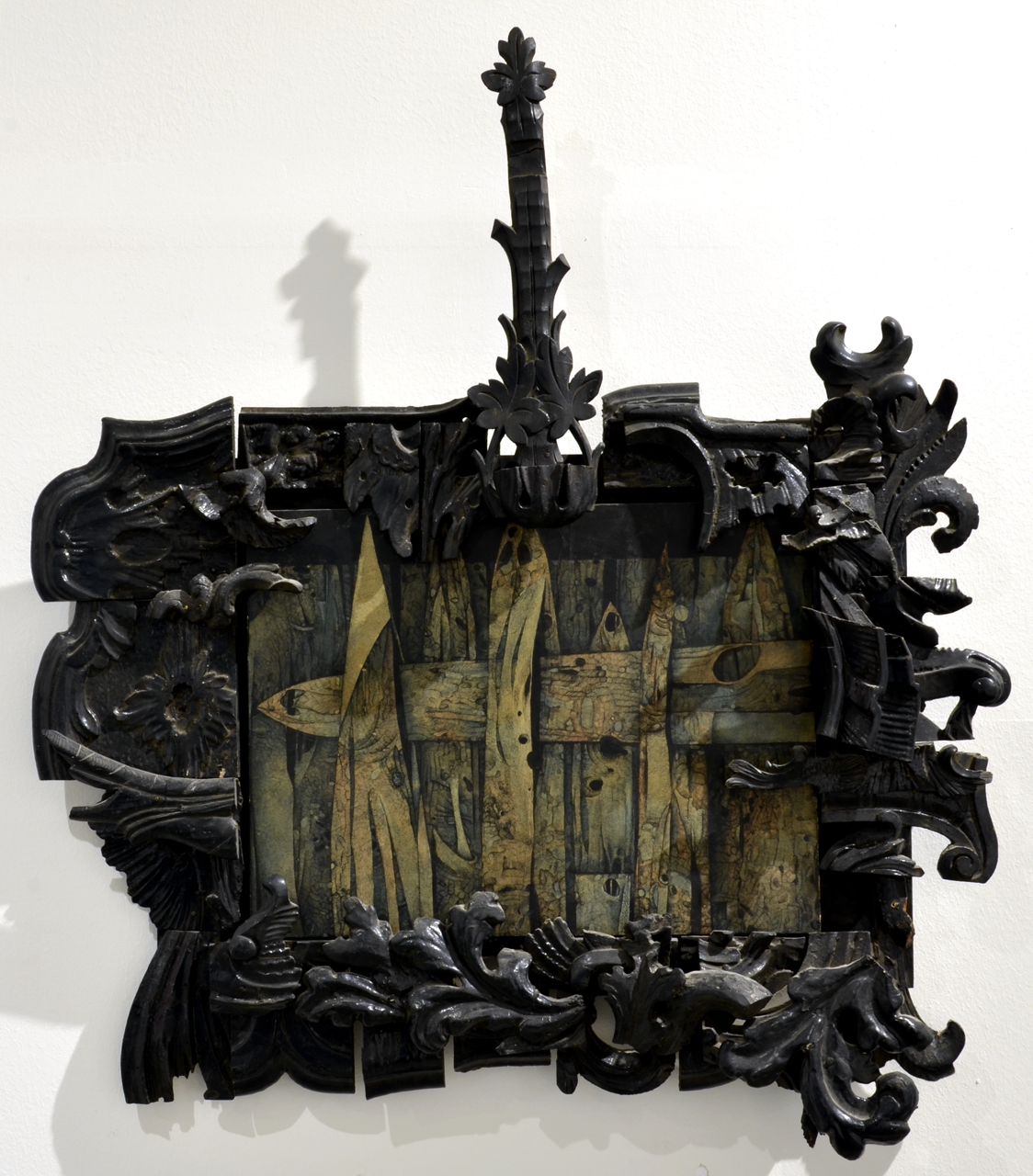
Knives (1963-1964), Museum Kampa

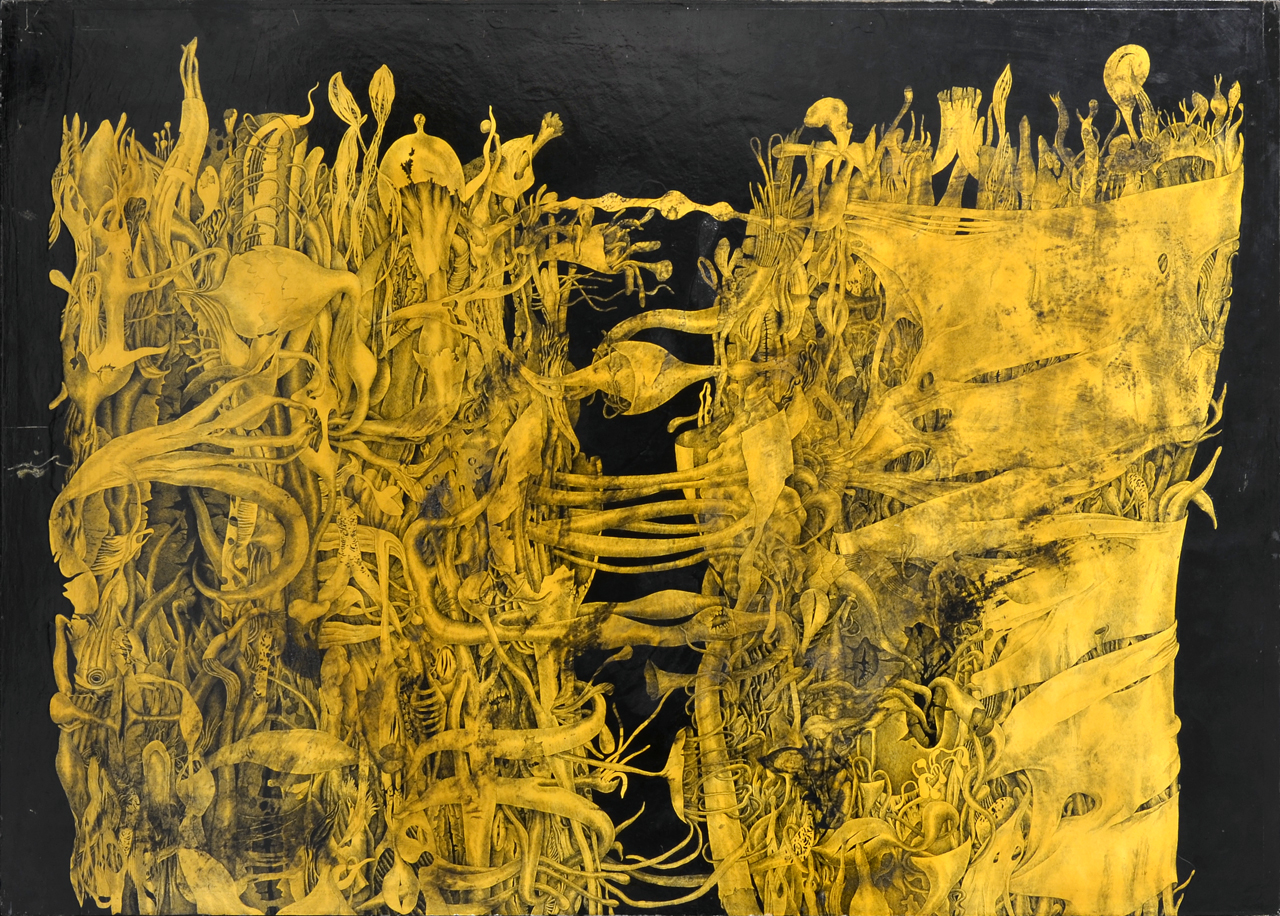
Animals (1965), Aleš South Bohemian Gallery in Hluboká nad Vltavou

The material assemblages from the mid-1960s are unified by the red colour scheme (Fakir's Landscape, Horsemen of the Apocalypse, 1964).

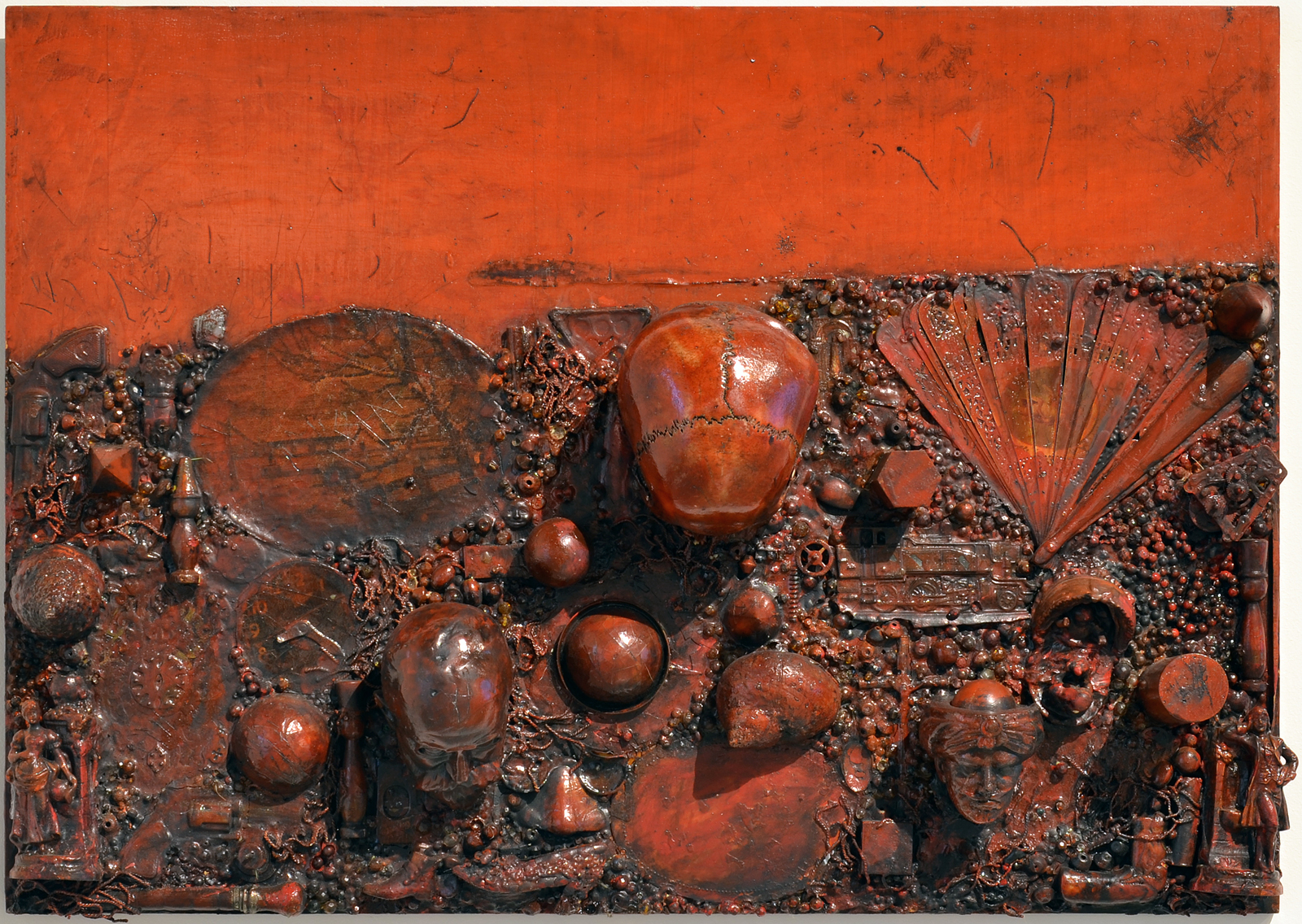
Fakir's Landscape (1964)

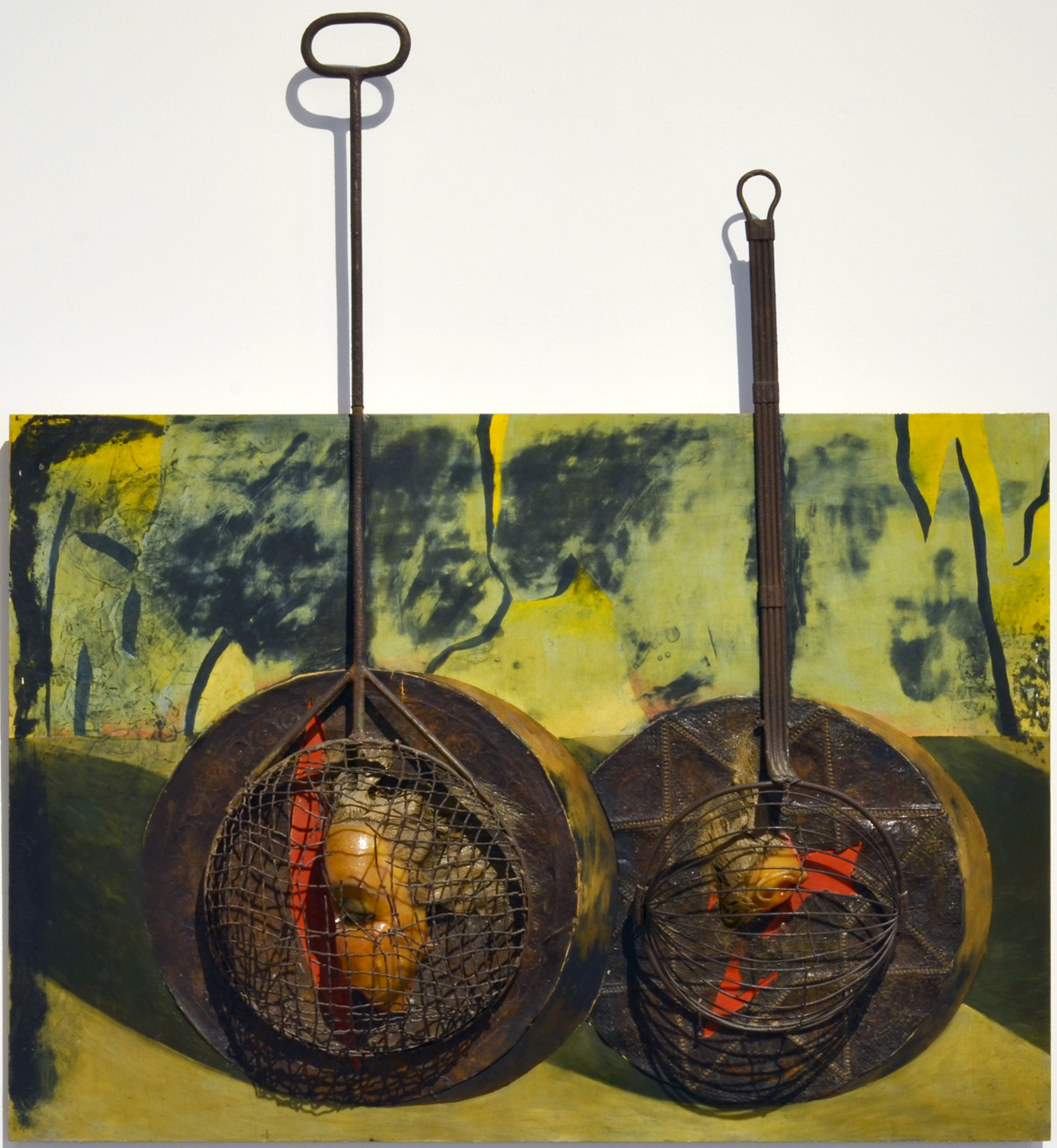
Heads (1964)

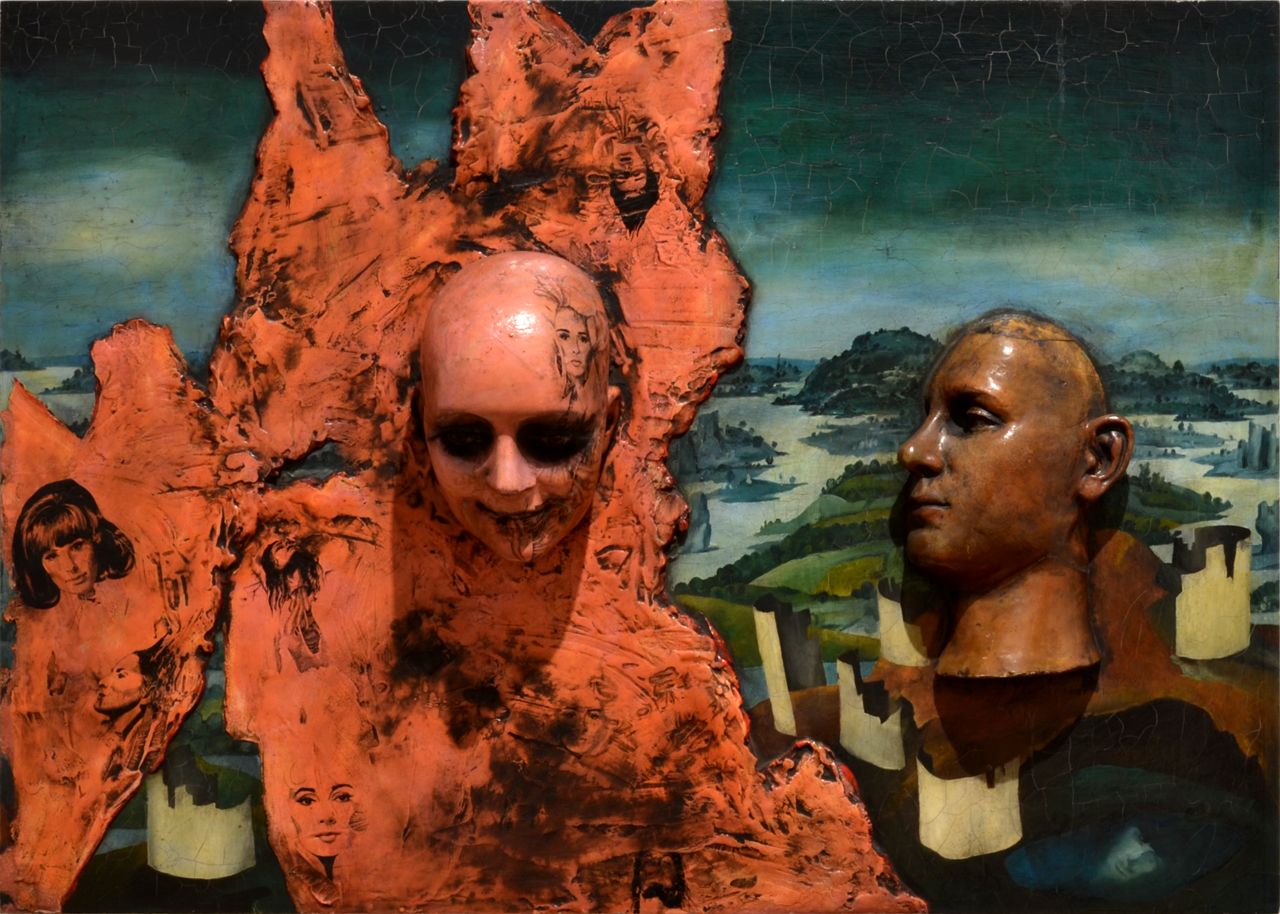
Lovers (1965), Gallery of the Central Bohemian Region in Kutná Hora

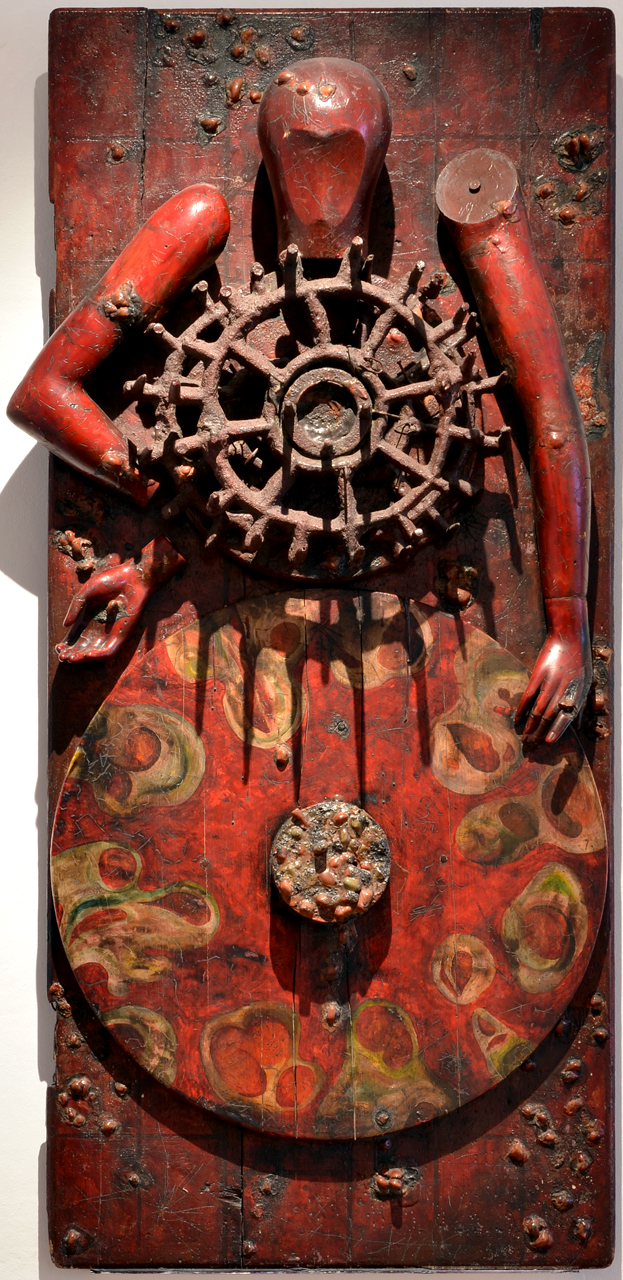
Shield bearer (1965), Gallery of the Central Bohemian Region in Kutná Hora

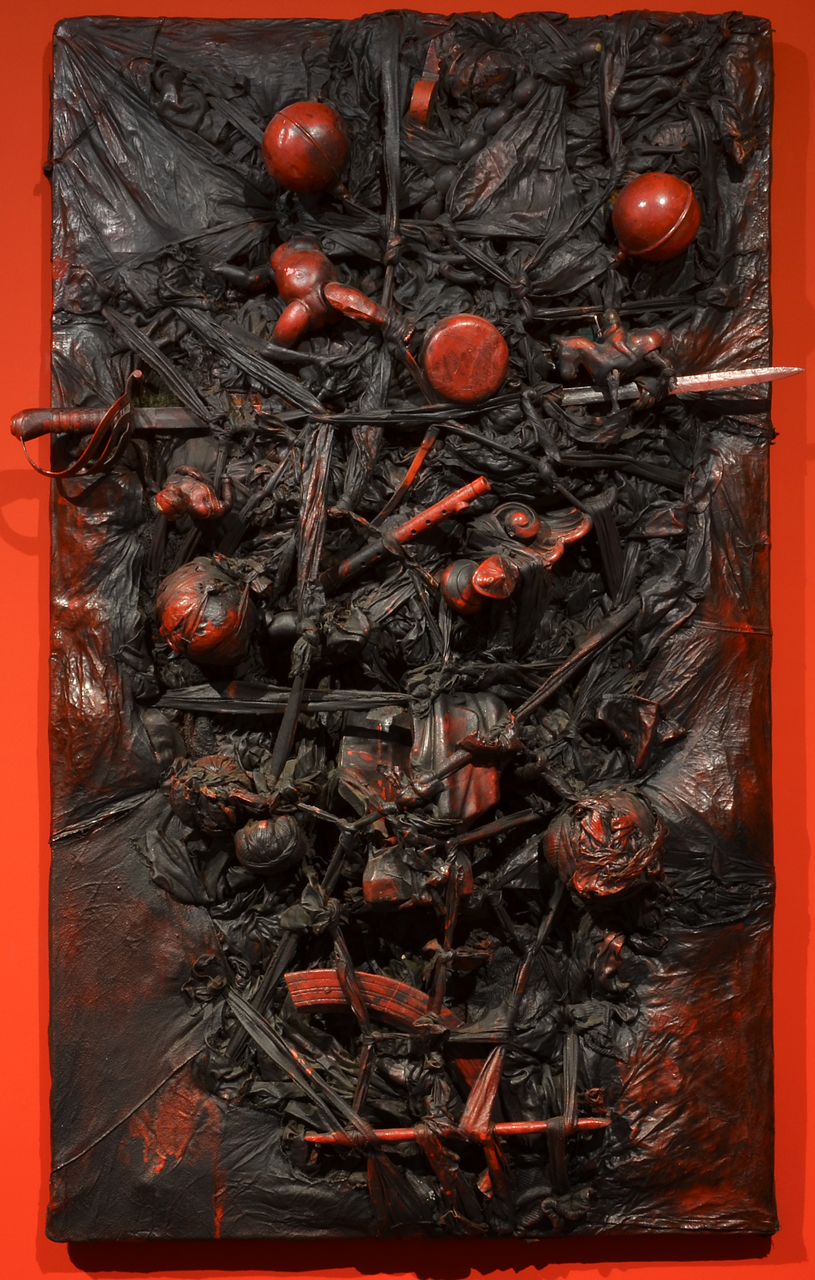
Horsemen of the Apocalypse (1964), Prague City Gallery

Vožniak's Baroque imagination became fully apparent in the 1960s, when his reputation soared. At that time he created works on the border between surrealism and pop art, teeming with imagination, mixing seriousness with vulgarity and breaking all taboos. Between 1963 and 1964 Vožniak freely incorporated some surrealist motifs into his paintings, such as the egg, the eye, the heart, the lips, the head, but he did not become an orthodox surrealist. The principle of interpenetration and disintegration, the opposition of the whole and the disrupted would become one of the hallmarks of his work. The plot is set in restrictive frames and overflowing with all sorts of symbols taken from the Surrealist repertoire, combined with images of consumer idols adapted from Pop art.

Vožniak did not shy away from straightforward depictions of eroticism, sometimes to the point of being unbearable. In the space of a drawing, painting or assemblage, the painter concentrates a multitude of individual motifs that create a rationally elusive reflection of the world. The wounding and the vulnerable, erotic aggression, dark forces and terrifying magic exist side by side.

In the 1970s, Vožniak returned to painting that is increasingly dark and tragic (The Running of Time, 1976, Death, 1977). The disintegration of social values and morality (after the Warsaw Pact invasion of Czechoslovakia), during the so-called normalisation period is reflected in the objects that fall into decay - shattering glass, skeletons of dead animals, cracking statues and walls, breaking vaults and columns, all often against a neutral grey background in mutual isolation and silence. In parallel, he creates high relief assemblages using wooden forms for hats.

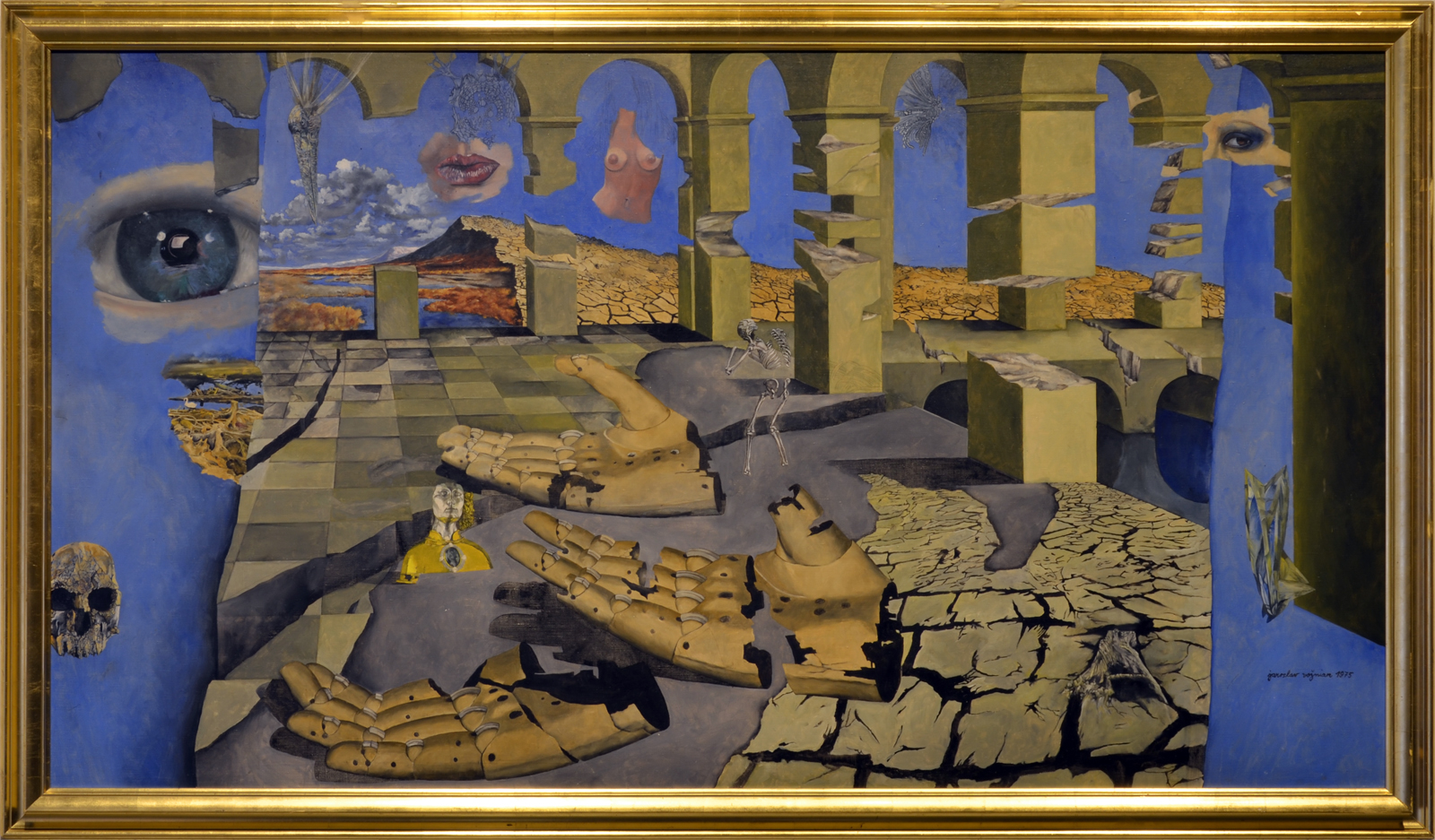
Treasure of St. Vitus (1975), Gallery of Fine Arts in Ostrava

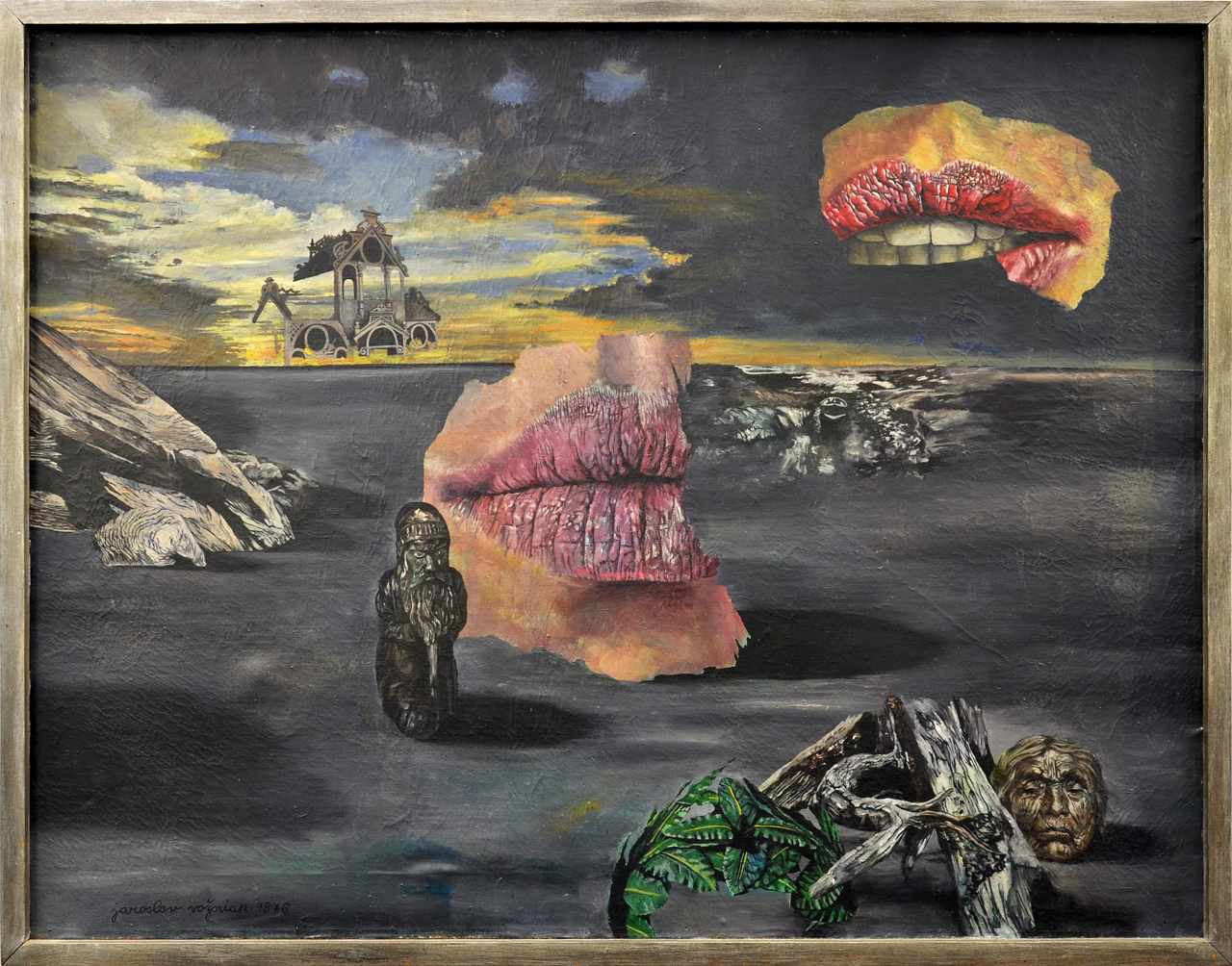
Running of Time (1976)

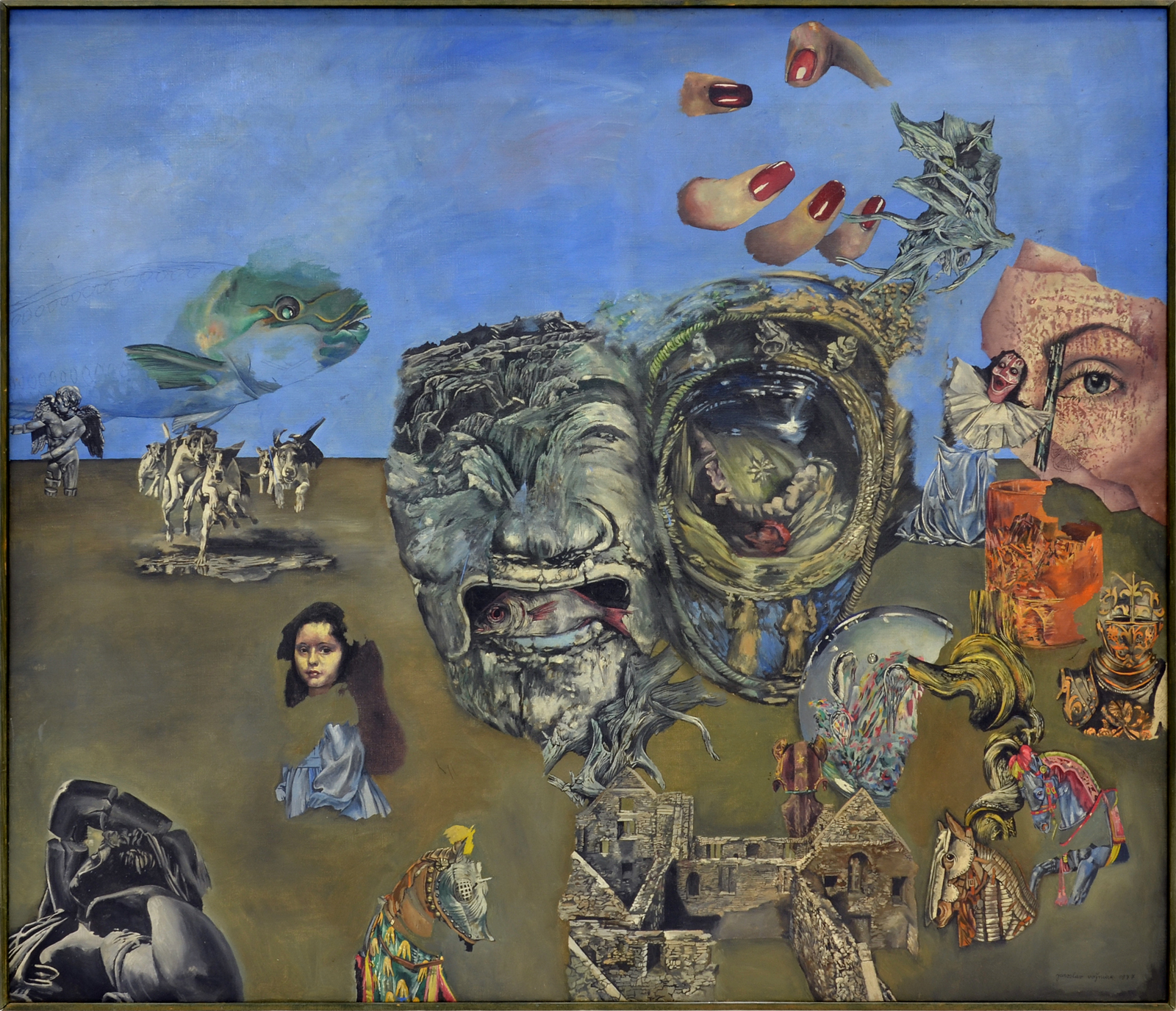
Death (1977)

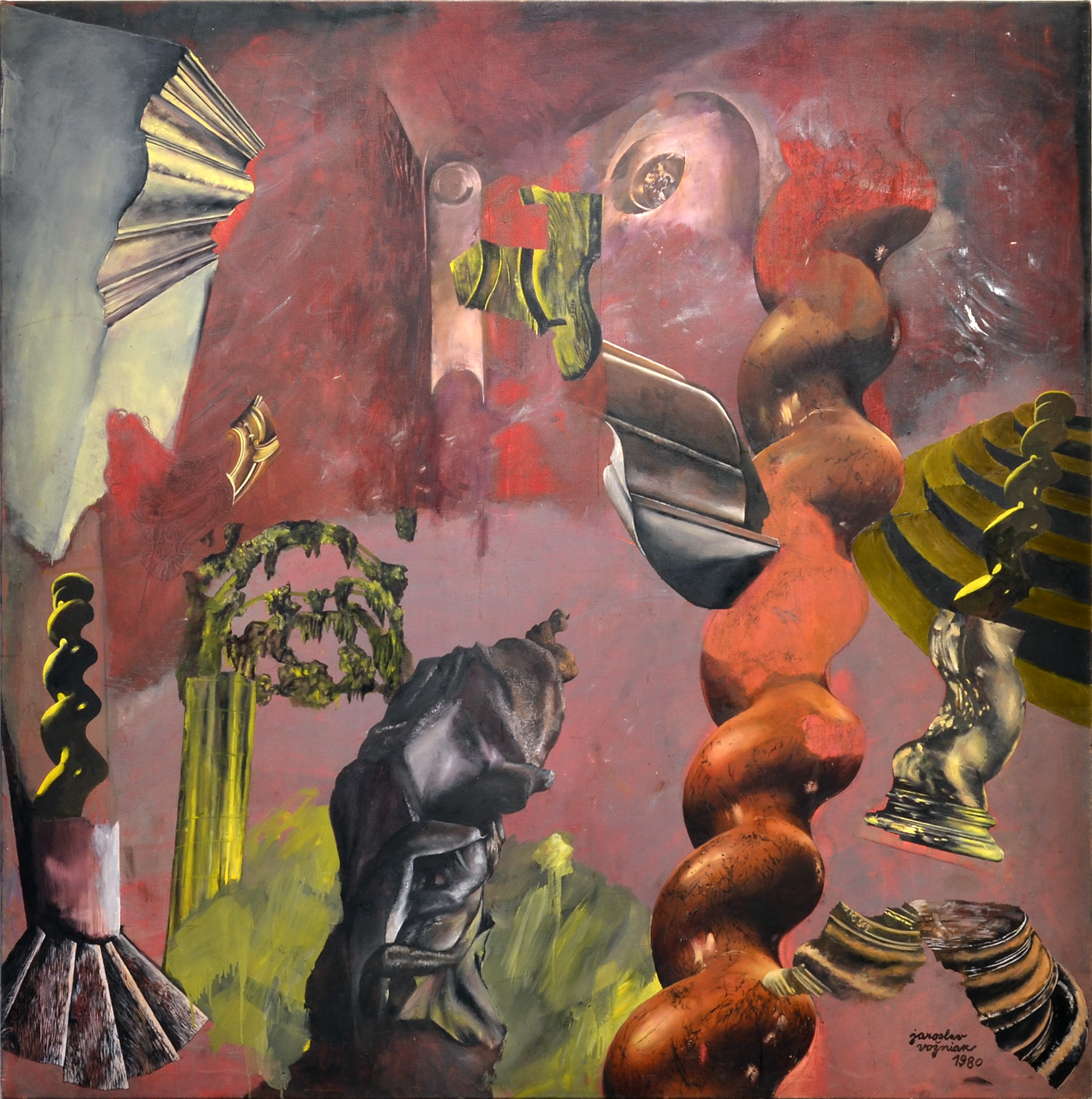
Dio's Walk through Baroque Prague (1980), Prague City Gallery

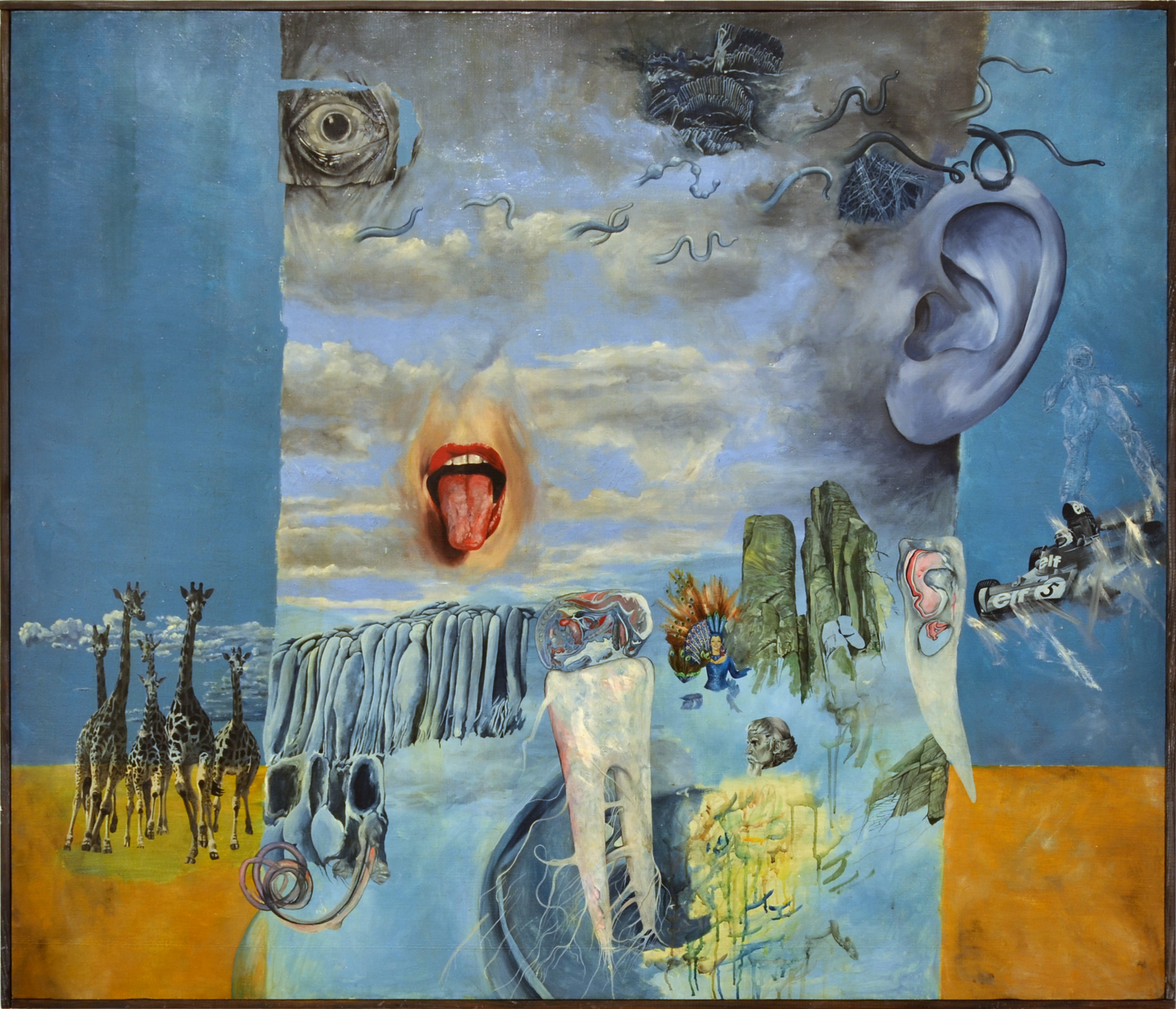
Homage to Weirdness (1981)

Vožniak also transformed pop art, whose influence began to penetrate into Czechoslovakia from the West, into a specifically Czech form. In 1967–1969, he created a series of thirty modern icons on wooden panels for an exhibition of Jablonec jewellery at the Liberec Fair. These consisted of portraits of stars of the cinema screen, decorated with examples of luxurious Czech jewellery (Jeanne Moreau, 1967; Monica Vitti, 1968-1969 GMU Roudnice; Jane Fonda, 1968). The entire exhibition was complemented by mirrors, dramatically lit and accompanied by music composed by Rudolf Komorous.

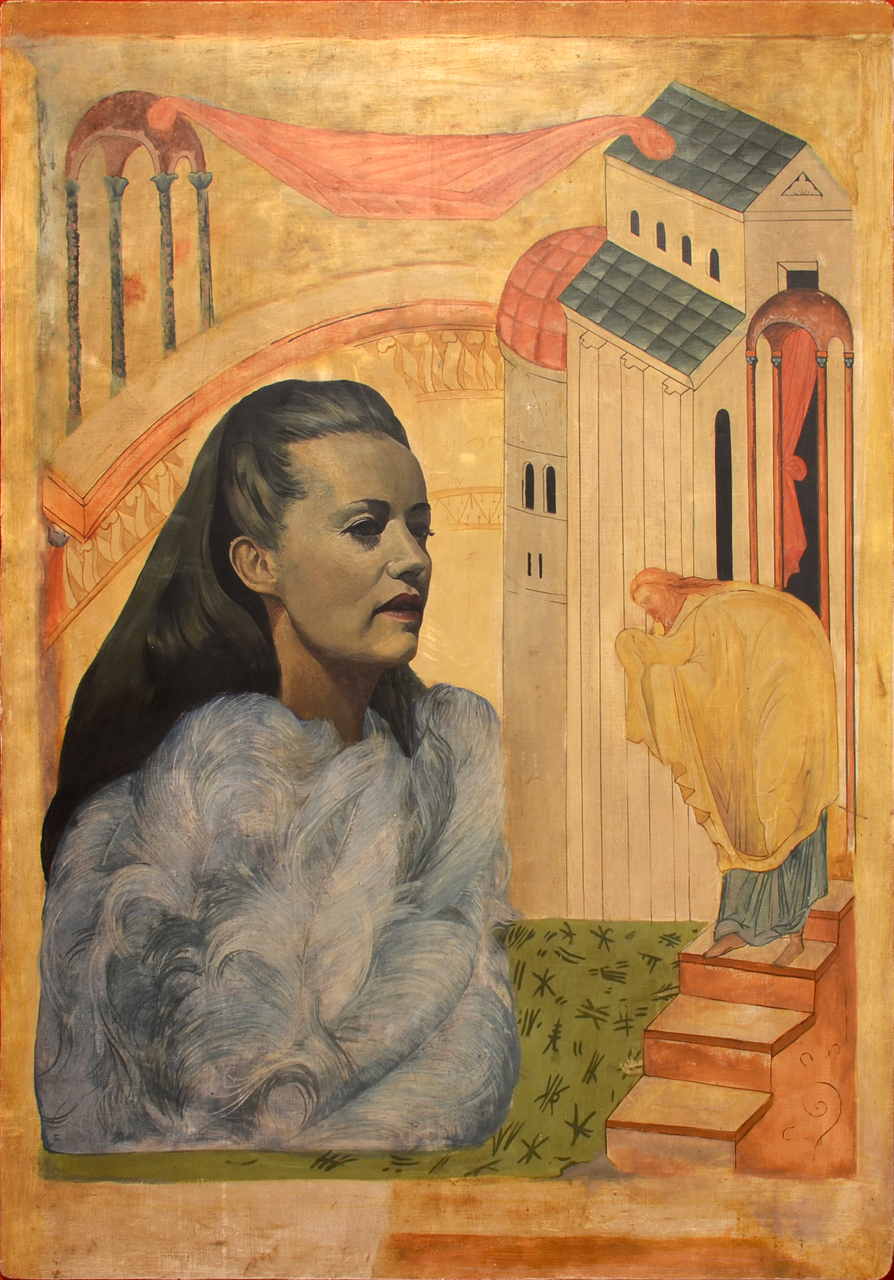
Icons, Jeanne Moreau (1967-1968), Gallery of Modern Art in Roudnice nad Labem

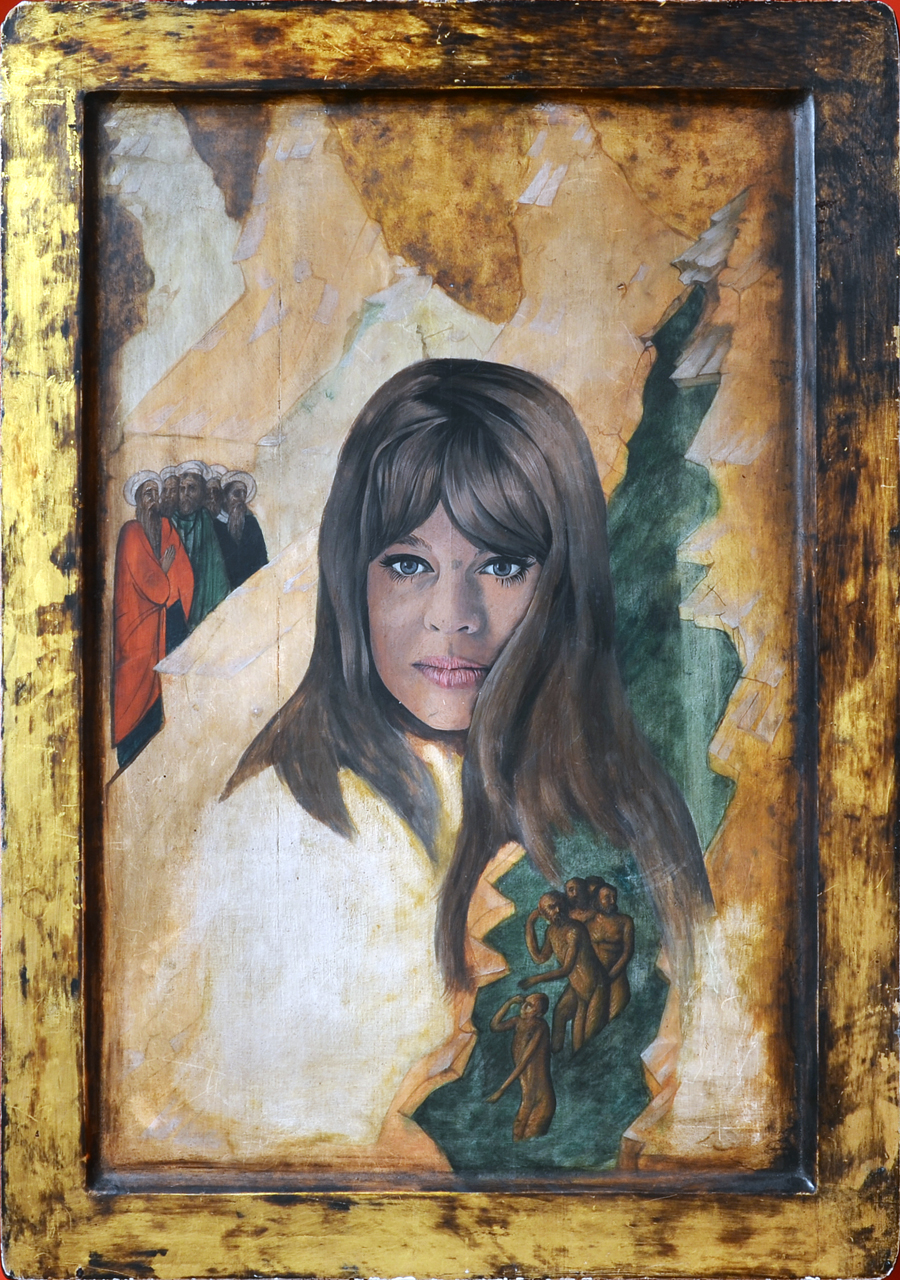
Icons, Julie Christie (1967-1968)

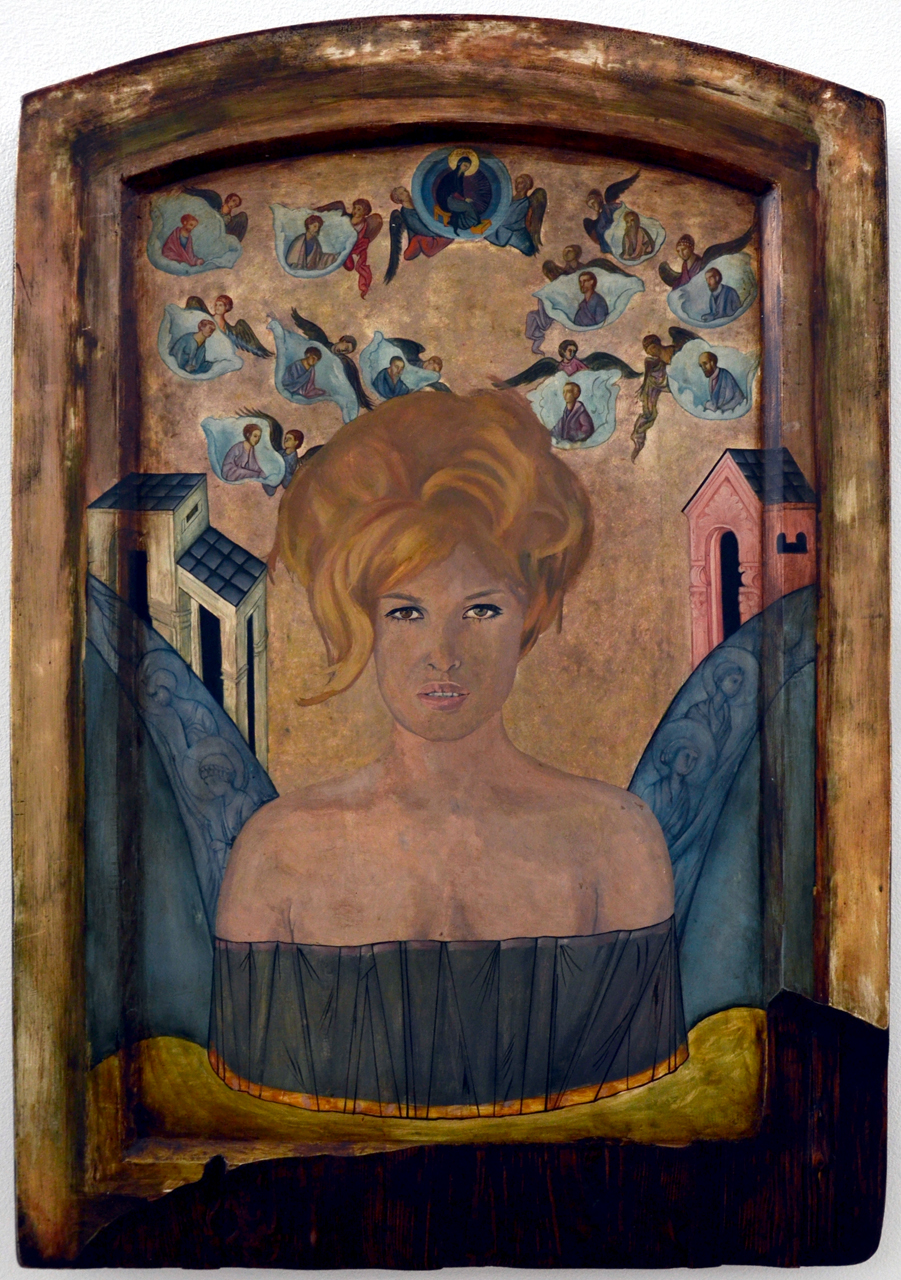
Icons, Monica Vitti (1968-1969), Gallery of Modern Art in Roudnice nad Labem

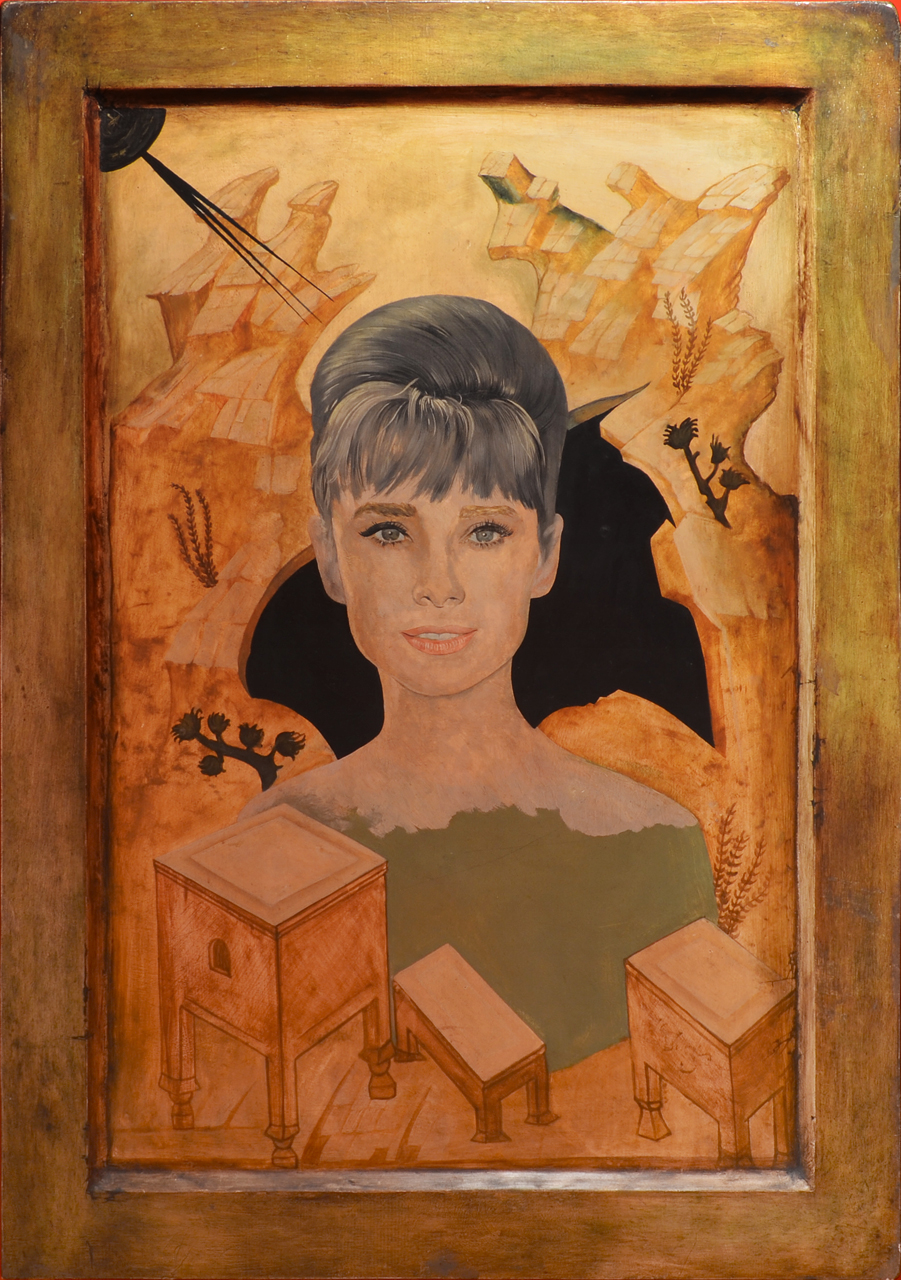
Icons, Audrey Hepburn (1967-1968), Aleš South Bohemian Gallery in Hluboká nad Vltavou

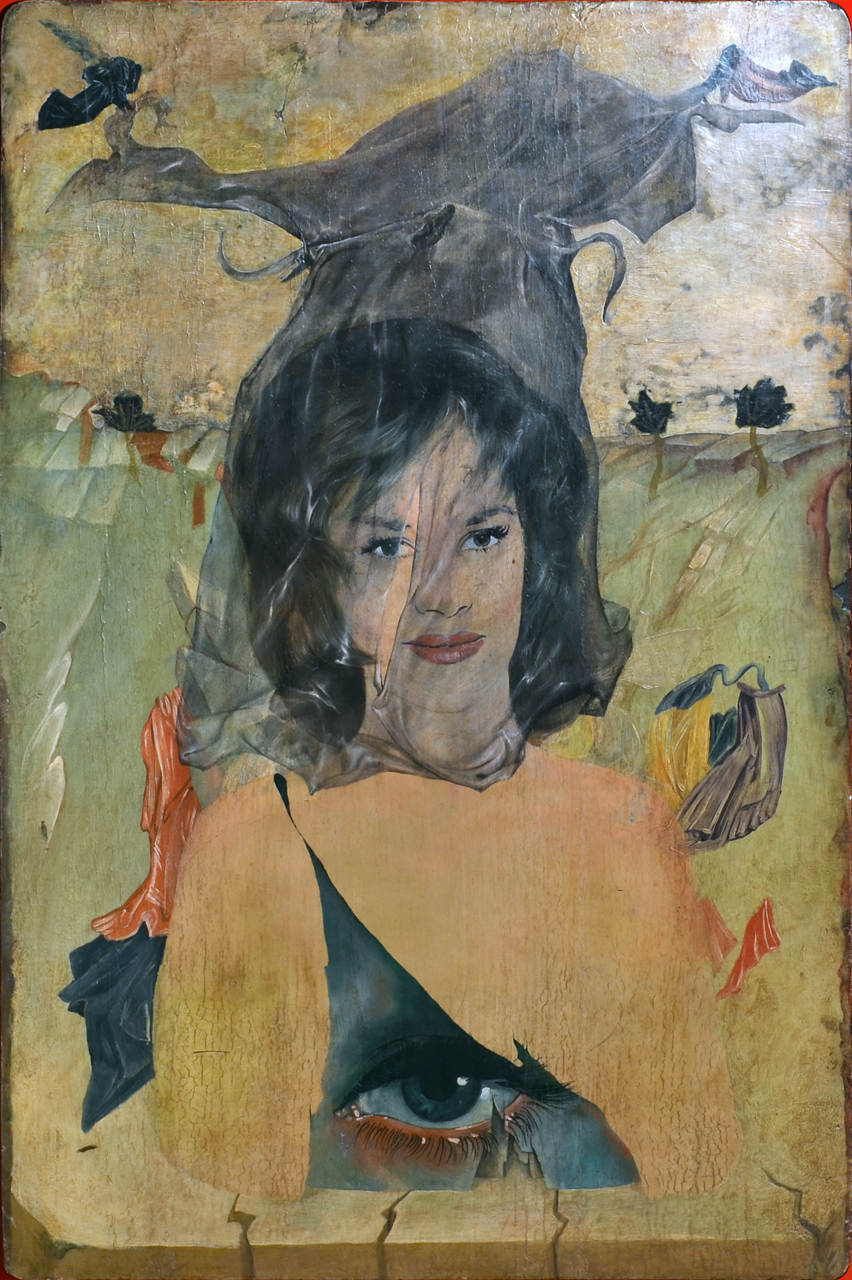
Icons, Antonella Lualdi (1967-1968), Aleš South Bohemian Gallery in Hluboká nad Vltavou

Vožniak's visions of decay are filled with social fetishes and debased idols, balancing between dreamlike imagination, ironic pop art and magical wizardry. The author follows the narrative tendencies of the 1960s, but imbues them with a complicated pictorial concept that is not easily decipherable. In the second half of the 1960s, Vožniak supplements the smooth illusionistic painting with real objects in the form of assemblage. Vožniak 's hyperbolic sense of the bizarre and his penchant for material variety manifest themselves in a brutally utilitarian disregard for the price of the objects used. In a series of assemblages he uses simultaneously old and rare objects, as if removed from a collection of antiques and curiosities, alongside banal and cheap fragments of the contemporary world. As a "tribute to the weird", he combines in a hyperbolic and grotesque way the morbidity of expressive baroque wax tombstones, turn-of-the-century salon degeneracy and contemporary figurative myth (Beatles, 1976).

In 1978 he briefly returned to abstraction in a series of monotypes, feeling that he had not sufficiently exhausted the problem in the early 1960s. The motif of spheres appears in his painting (Homage to Vasarely, 1980). In the first half of the 1980s, the artist interrupted his work and did not return until 1987. It was then that he created a series of smaller assemblages with balls, collaged anatomical prints, postcards and valuable old stickers (Easter, 1987). The balls and table tennis balls develop the theme of the circle as a window into the micro or macro world. In these, Vožniak once again reaches for burlesque exaggeration and the accumulation of details. The collages are subordinated to geometric order and are characterized by formal perfection, but they illustrate the horrific aspects of human existence. Some works take the form of diptychs, composed of a plastic plate with an assemblage and a plate flat collaged with the artist's cut-up abstract monotypes.

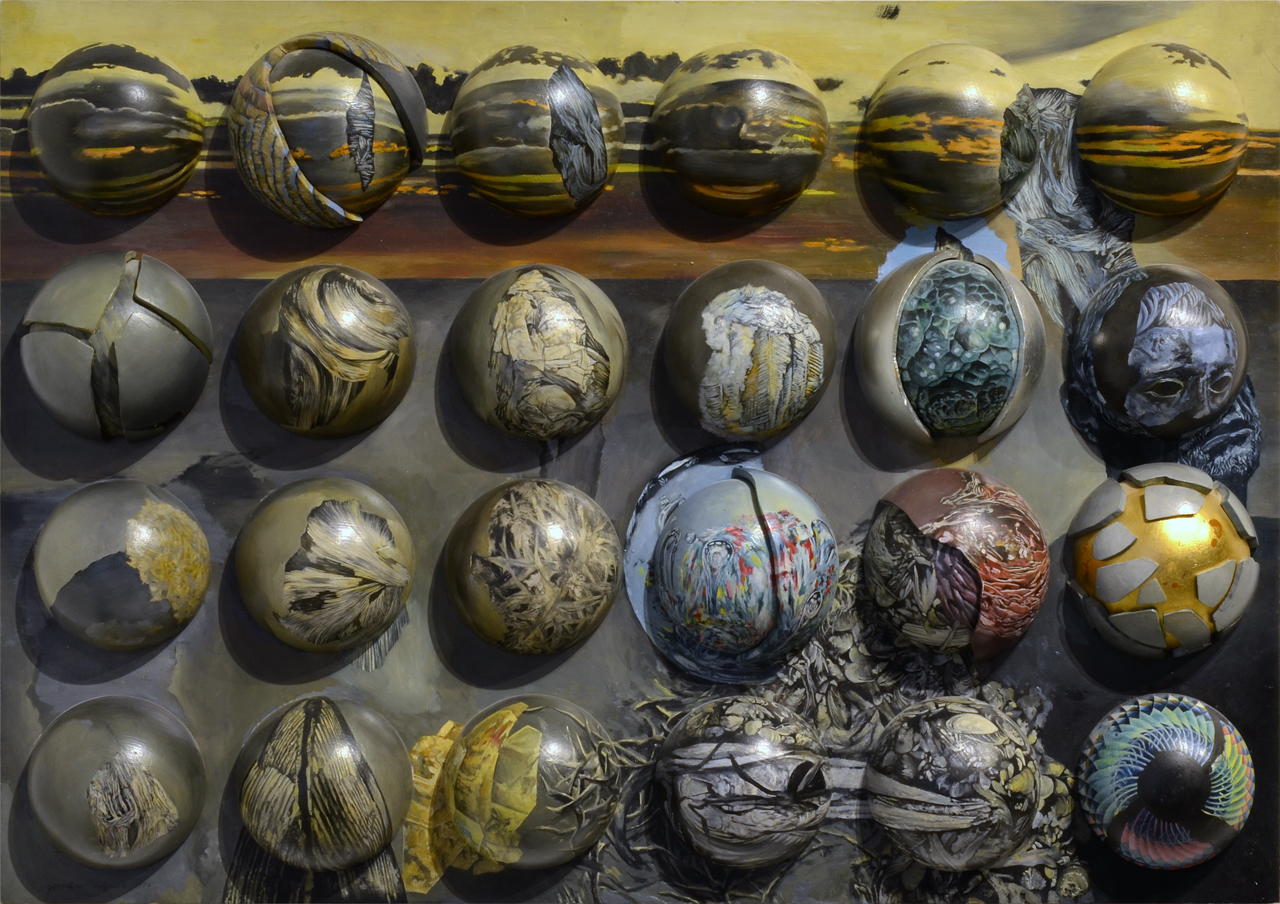
Homer and His World (1978)

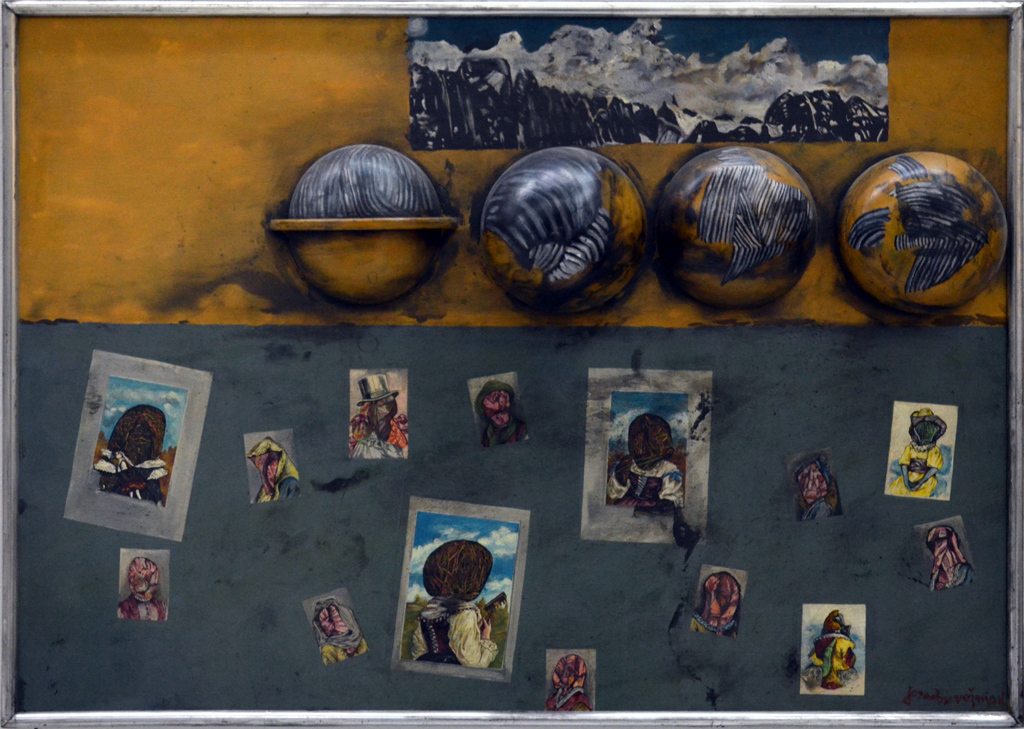
Meadow, assemblage (1989)

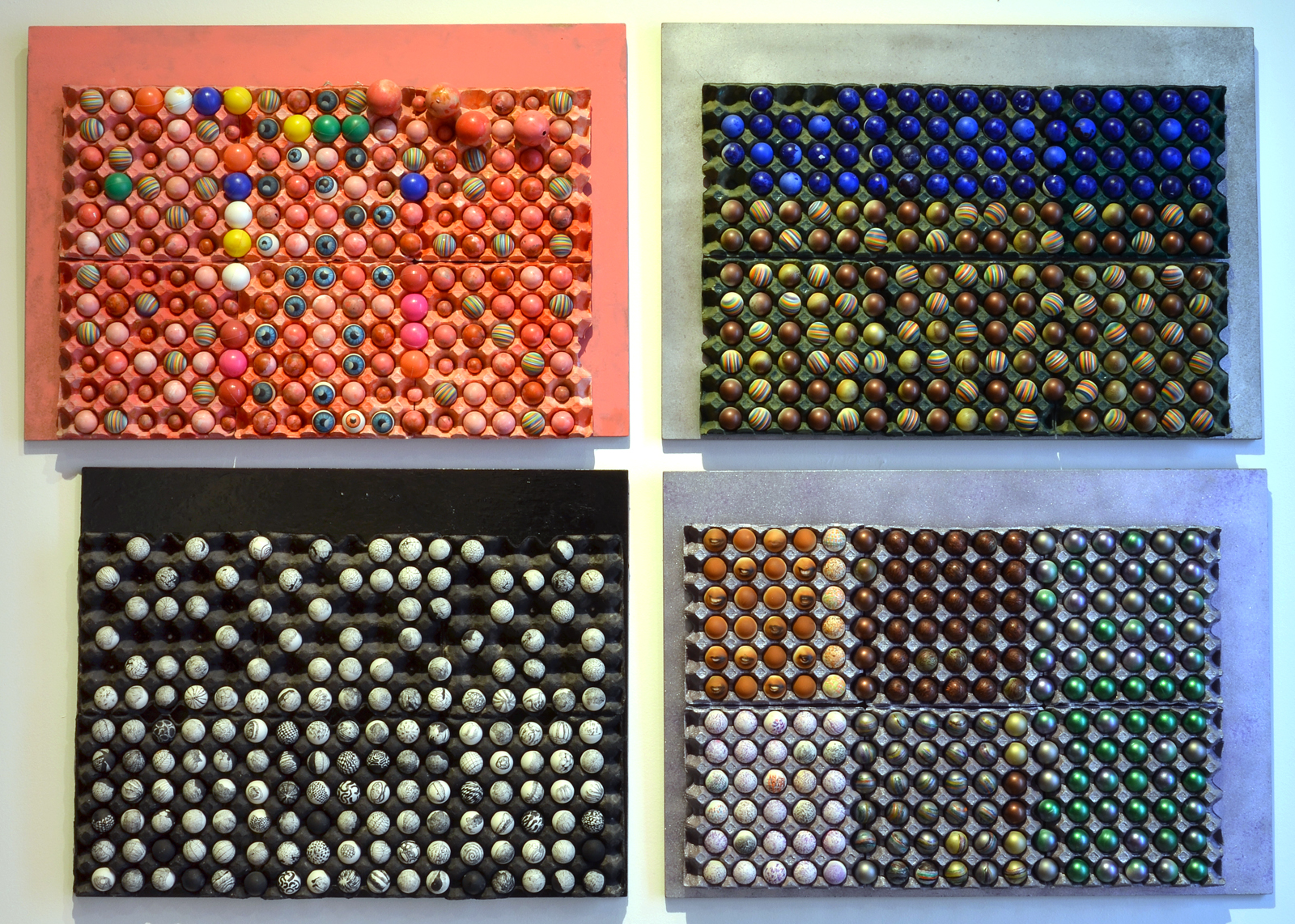
Untitled (2004-2005), mixed media, ping pong balls, paper, 4 pcs 69 x 100 cm

In the early 1990s, Vožniak again sought a path to abstraction, adapting Pollock's method using cast synthetic paint (Homage to Pollock, 1991, 1994, 2003). His works, however, do not appear expressive - they are almost monochromatic or limited to a range of shades of yellow, and the trace of paint created by the casting is close to a regular grid. Vožniak focuses only on the "abstract" energy itself - its traces, records, calligraphy, ritual flow, layered harmony and meditative effect.

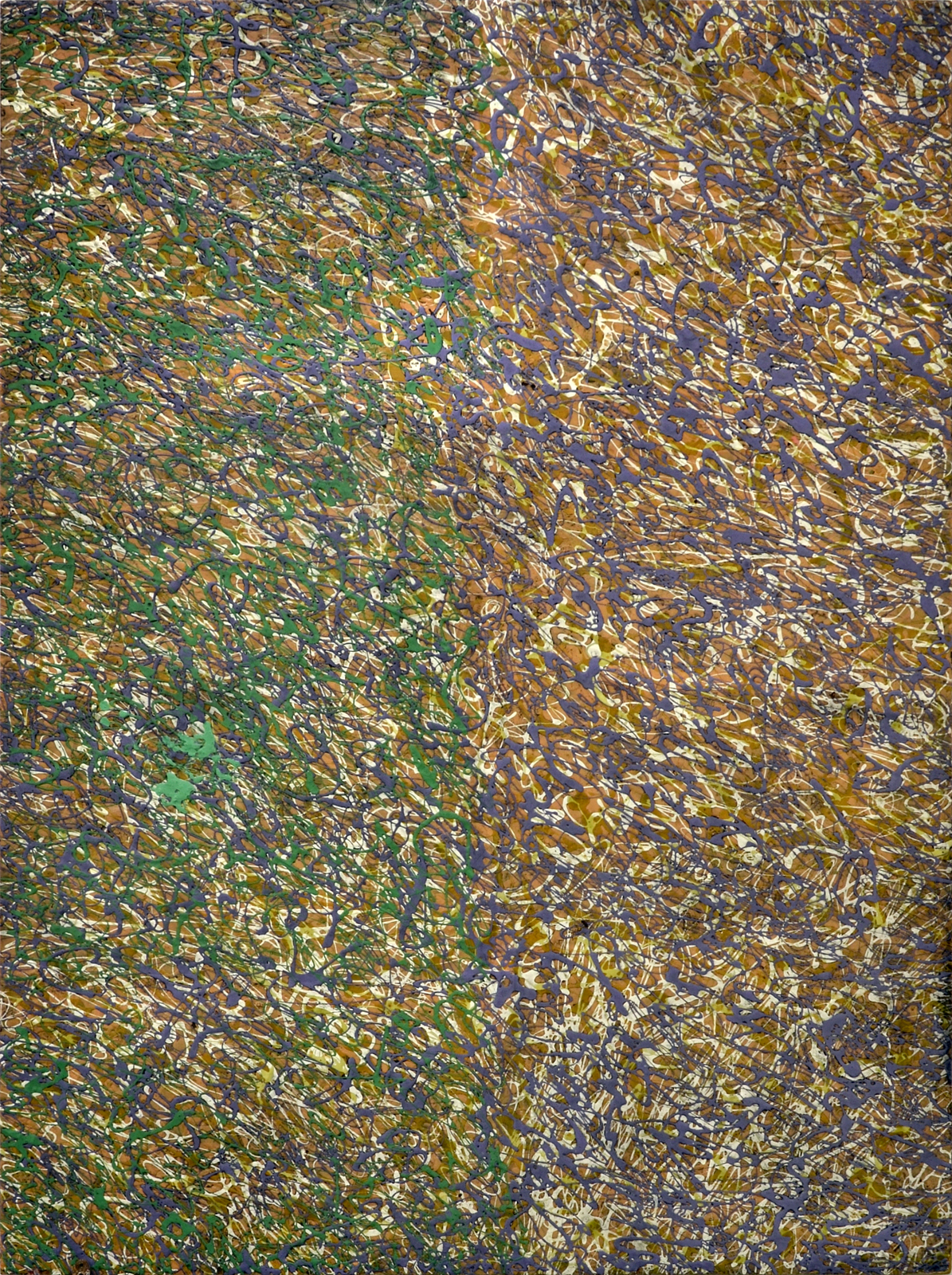
Homage to Pollock (1991)

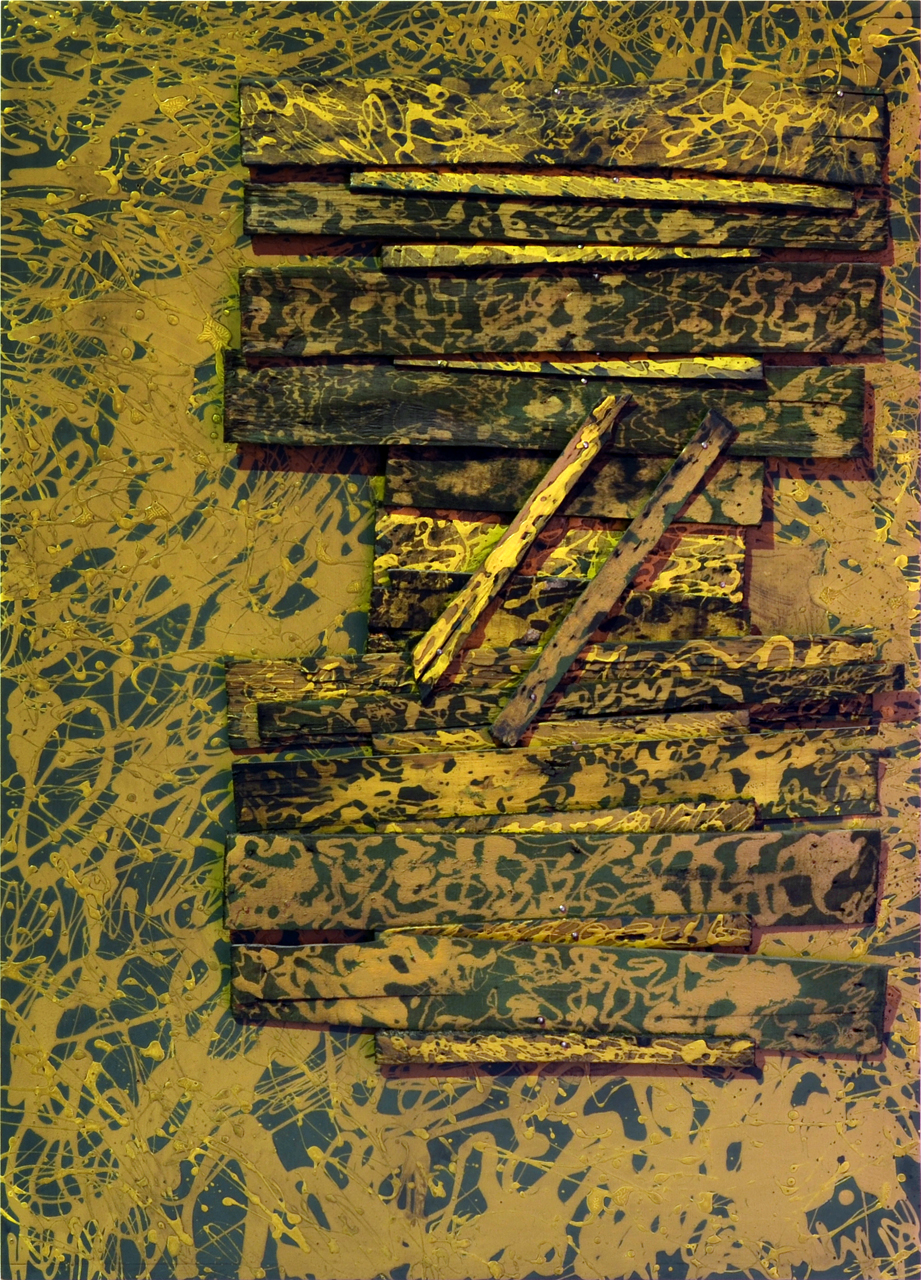
Blinds (1991), Museum Kampa

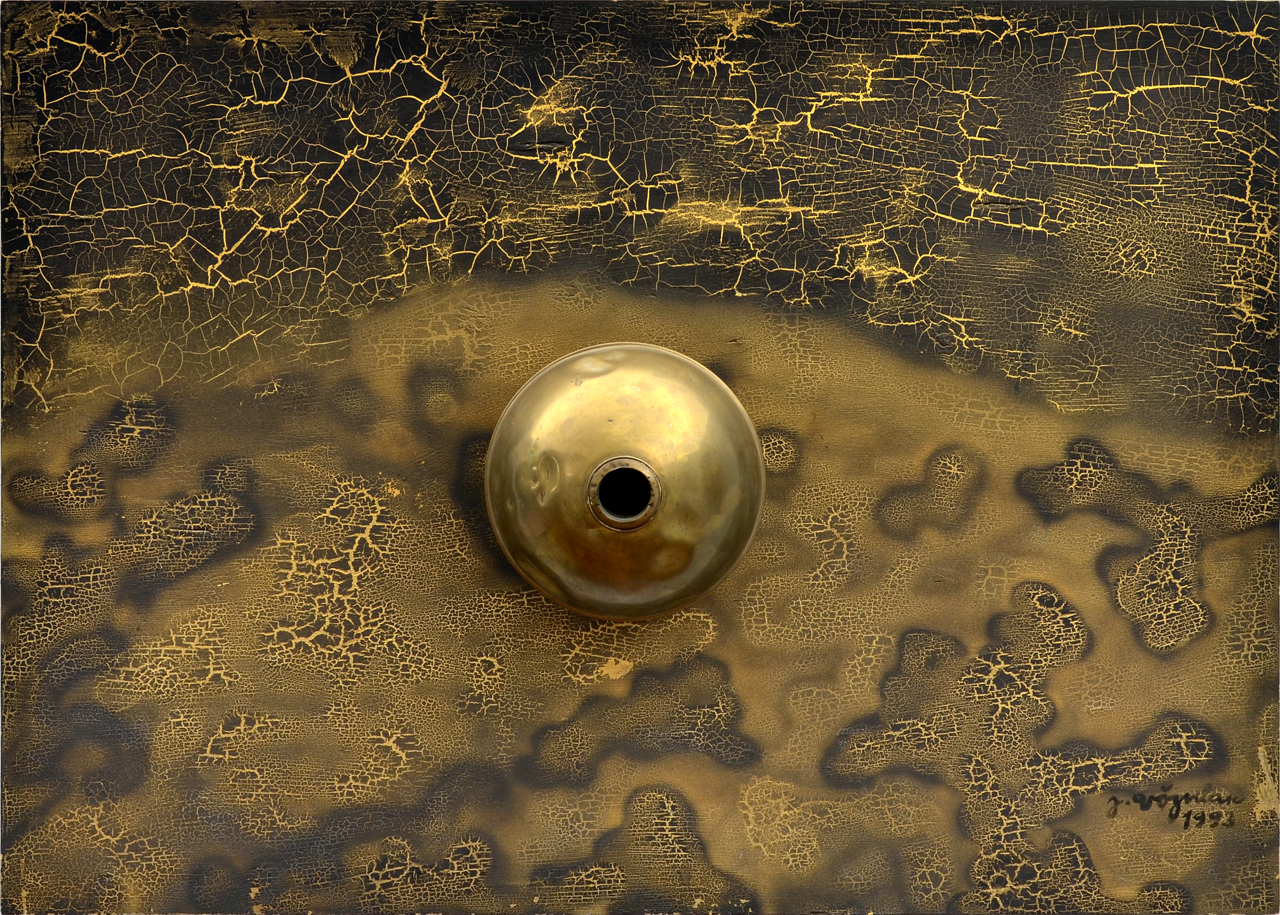
Planet (1993)

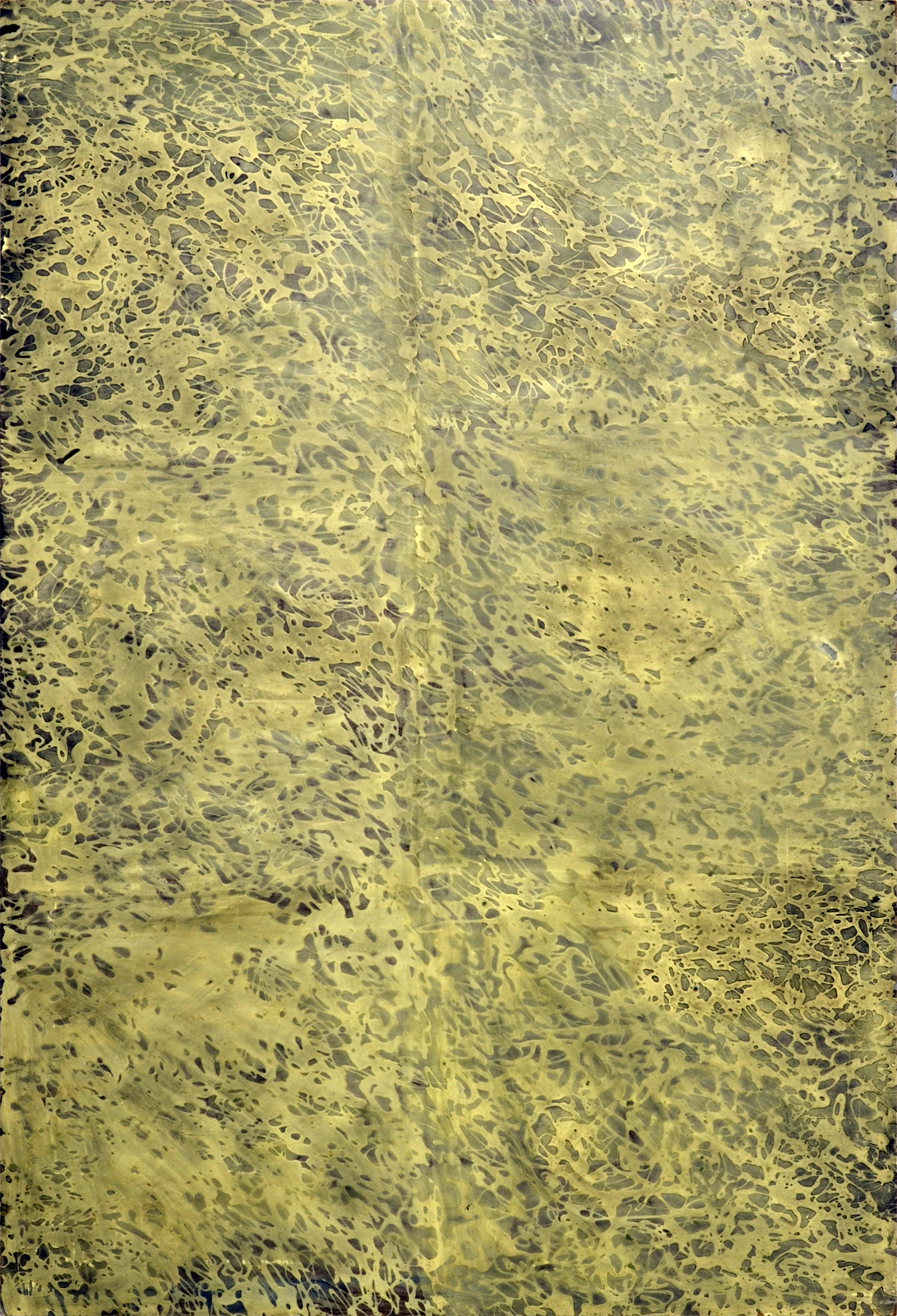
Homage to Pollock (1994)

Vožniak represents a particular type of visual extrovert and signifying introvert, creating, from an external perspective, an excited and sarcastic hyperbole of contemporary civilisation with its animalistic urges, fetishism, and sexual promiscuity. His inner workings can only be surmised and guessed at. Vožniak 's sense of the unexpected confrontations of the elements of everyday life pointed to a state of society "in which the hypocritical ideals of progress and morality conceal an obsession with sex and a fascination with horror and crime."

=== Prints, drawings and illustrations ===
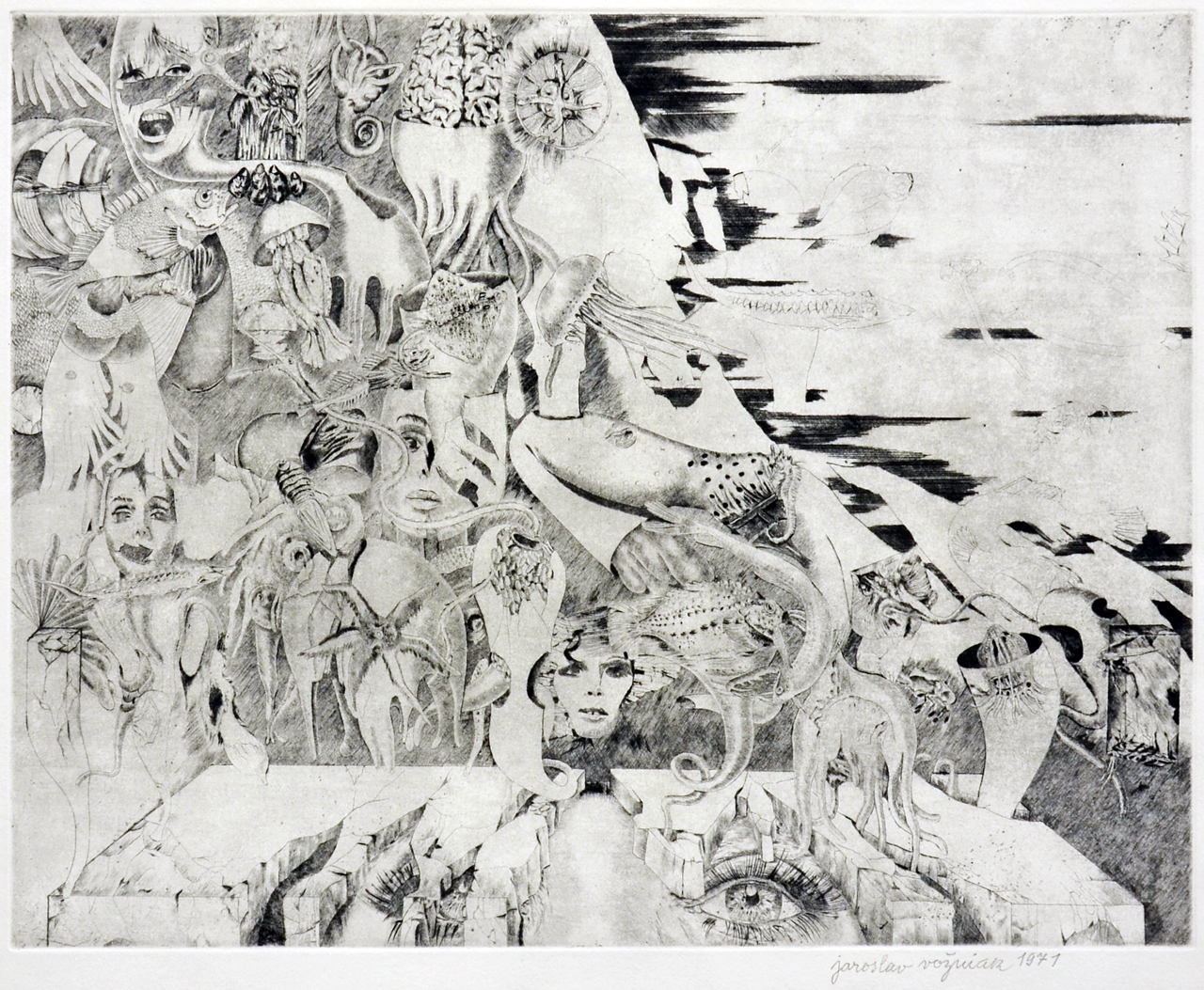
Sea, drypoint (1971)

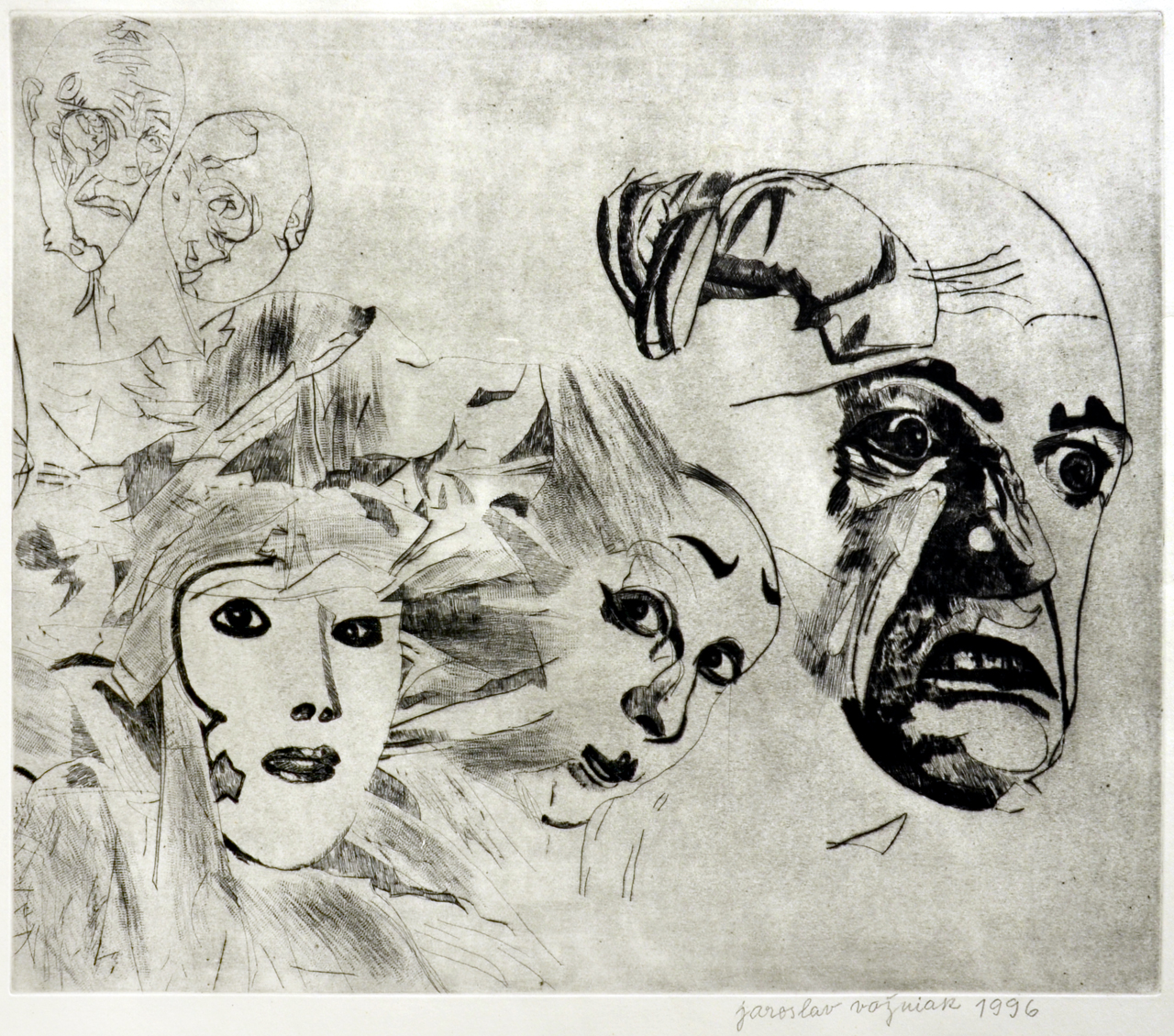
Clowns, drypoint (1996)

=== Illustrations ===
- 1958 Dante Alighieri, The Divine Comedy
- 1963 Frederik Pohl, C. M. Kornbluth, Merchants of the Universe [1][unavailable source]
- 1964 Vladimír Nárožník, Words, carte blanche
- 1967 Charles Baudelaire, Small Poems in Prose, Mladá fronta Praha
- 1970 André Pieyre de Mandiargues, Black Museum, Odeon
- In the 1960s he also illustrated the magazines Flame and Face and the anthology Pramen

=== Collaboration on film ===
Jaroslav Vožniak, as a set designer and creator of various props (jewellery, amulets, altar), together with other artists, participated in the most important film of Czech cinema of the 1960s, Marketa Lazarová (directed by František Vláčil, 1967).

=== Postage stamp ===
Assemblage Lovers (1965), Gallery of the Central Bohemian Region in Kutná Hora, issued on a postage stamp in 2011 (engraving by Václav Fajt).

=== Representation in collections ===
- National Gallery Prague
- Centre Pompidou, Paris
- Museum Kampa
- Prague City Gallery
- Moravian Gallery in Brno
- Aleš South Bohemian Gallery in Hluboká nad Vltavou
- Gallery of Modern Art in Hradec Králové
- Regional Gallery in Liberec
- Regional Gallery of Highlands in Jihlava
- Czech Museum of Fine Arts, Prague (now Gallery of the Central Bohemian Region in Kutná Hora)
- North Bohemian Art Gallery in Litoměřice
- Gallery of Modern Art in Roudnice nad Labem
- Benedikt Rejt Gallery, Louny
- Gallery of Fine Arts in Ostrava
- Art Gallery Karlovy Vary
- Museum of Art Olomouc
- East Bohemian Gallery in Pardubice

=== Exhibitions ===
==== Solo ====
- 1963 Jaroslav Vožniak: Collages, Paravan Theatre, Prague
- 1964 Jaroslav Vožniak: Paintings for Dante's Divine Comedy, Regional Museum, Roztoky
- 1964 Jaroslav Vožniak: Paintings, Drawings, Objects from 1958 to 1964, Gallery of Youth, Aleš Hall of the Art Meeting, Prague
- 1965 Jaroslav Vožniak, Regional Gallery in Liberec
- 1969 Jaroslav Vožniak, Galerie Scandinavia, Stockholm
- 1970 Jaroslav Vožniak: Icons, House of Art - Exhibition Hall of the City of České Budějovice
- 1971 Jaroslav Vožniak: Icons, House of the Lords of Kunštát, Brno
- 1990 Jaroslav Vožniak, House of the Stone Bell, 2nd floor, Prague
- 1991 Jaroslav Vožniak: Paintings 1991, Fronta Gallery, Prague
- 1992 Jaroslav Vožniak: collages, objects, Luka Gallery, Prague
- 1993 Jaroslav Vožniak: Paintings - assemblages, Restaurant BIPP Gallery, České Budějovice
- 1993 Homage to Jaroslav Vožniak: Correlation of Shapes and Colours, National House at Vinohrady, Prague, Central European Gallery and Publishing House, Prague
- 1994 Jaroslav Vožniak: Paintings, Galerie ve dvoře, Veselí nad Moravou, District Museum of Bohemian Paradise, Turnov
- 1995 Jaroslav Vožniak: In the Ostrava Region - Views into Private Collections, Nová síň, Poruba, Ostrava
- 1995 Jaroslav Vožniak: Paintings, Prints, Central European Gallery Prague
- 1998 Jaroslav Vožniak and his school (Marta Hadincová, Miroslav Hadinec, Ivana Vožniaková), Zámeček Gallery, Příbram
- 1999 Jaroslav Vožniak: Paintings, Prints, AP Gallery, Hradec Králové
- 1999 Jaroslav Vožniak: New Works, EC Eliška Schránilová Gallery, Prague
- 1999/2000 Jaroslav Vožniak: Homage to Weirdness - works from 1957 - 1999, Gallery of Fine Arts in Cheb, Czech Museum of Fine Arts, Prague
- 2001 Vožniak's School of Czech Fantasy Realism, Czech Centre in Vienna
- 2001 Jaroslav Vožniak, Exhibition Hall Sokolská 26, Ostrava
- 2010 Jaroslav Vožniak, Potoční Gallery, Příbram
- 2017 Jaroslav Vožniak, Museum Kampa, Prague
- 2019 Jaroslav Vožniak, All hope abandon, ye who enter in!, GASK Kutná Hora

==== Collective exhibitions abroad (selection) ====
- 1965 Jeune avant-garde tchécoslovaque, Galerie Lambert, Paris
- 1966 Comparaisons, Musée d'Art Moderne de la Ville de Paris (ARC), Paris
- 1966 Tschechoslowakische Kunst der Gegenwart, Akademie der Künste, Berlin
- 1966 Arte actual Checoslovaco, Museo de Arte Moderno, Ciudad de México
- 1966 Nouvelle génération tchécoslovaque, Galerie Maya, (Brussels
- 1967 Tjeckoslovakisk nutidskonst, Göteborg, Lund, Örebro, Varnamo, Norrköping, Nyköping, Hälsingborg, Stockholm
- 1967 Mostra d´arte contemporanea cecoslovacca, Castello del Valentino, Torino
- 1967 Tschechische Kunst, Kunstforum Göhrde
- 1967 17 tsjechische kunstenaars, Galerie Orez, Den Haag
- 1968 Tschechoslowakische zeitgenössische Kunst, Frankfurt am Main
- 1968 Alternative attuali 3, Castello Spagnolo, L´Aquila
- 1969 Tschechische Malerei des 20. Jahrhunderts, Ausstellungsräume Berlin 12, Berlin
- 1969 Sept jeunes peintres tchécoslovaques, Galerie Lambert, Paris
- 1969 L´art tchèque actuel, Renault Champs - Élysées, Paris
- 1969 Salon de Mai, Sales d´Exposition Wilson, Paris
- 1969 Arte contemporanea in Cecoslovacchia, Galleria Nazionale d'Arte Moderna e Contemporanea (GNAM), Roma
- 1970 Art tchèque du XXe siècle, Musée Rath, Genève
- 1970 Tschechische Kunst des 20. Jahrhunderts: Einige Aspekte der Entwicklung, Kunsthaus Zürich
- 1983 Dessins tchèques du 20e siècle, Centre Pompidou, Paris
- 1996 Eine Promenade der Romantiker, Stadtmuseum Göhre, Jena
- 2015 Einfach phantastisch!, Barockschloss Riegersburg

== Sources ==
- Jan Kříž: Šmidrové, Obelisk, Prague 1970
- František Šmejkal, Czech Imaginative Art, Galerie Rudolfinum, Prague 1996, ISBN 8090219411

=== Articles ===
- Jan Kříž, The Aesthetics of Weirdness, Fine Arts 17, 1967, pp. 1–13

=== Catalogues ===
- Jaroslav Vožniak: Paintings for Dante's Divine Comedy, 1964, Jiří Kohoutek, cat. 8 p., Regional Museum, Roztoky
- Jaroslav Vožniak: Paintings, drawings, objects from 1958 to 1964, 1964, Jan Kříž, cat. 16 p., Czech Museum of Art, Prague
- Jaroslav Vožniak: Contemporary Czech Graphic Art and Drawing 10, 1965, Čestmír Krátký, cat. 10 p., Regional Gallery in Liberec
- Jaroslav Vožniak: Czechoslovakia / Tchécosovaquie, 1969, Jiří Mašín, cat. 28 p., Galerie Scandinavia, Stockholm
- Vožniak: Icons, 1970, Jiří Mašín, cat. 16 p., AJG Hluboká
- Jaroslav Vožniak, 1990, Marie Judlová, cat. 64 p., Prague City Gallery
- Jaroslav Vožniak: Paintings 1991, 1991, Jan Kříž, Galerie Fronta Praha
- Tribute to Jaroslav Vožniak on his 60th birthday, Jiří Kohoutek, ČMVU Prague, Central Cultural House of Railway Workers, Prague 1993
- Jaroslav Vožniak: Paintings - assemblages, 1993, Jan Kříž, Restaurant BIPP Gallery, České Budějovice
- Jaroslav Vožniak in Ostrava, 1995, Vilém Jůza, cat. 40 p., Gallery of Fine Arts in Ostrava, ISBN 8085091364
- Jaroslav Vožniak: Homage to the Strange: works from 1957 - 1999, 2000, Jan Kříž, cat. 78 p., GVU in Cheb, ČMVU Prague, ISBN 8085016486
- Jaroslav Vožniak, 2001, Milan Weber, Exhibition Hall Sokolská 26, Ostrava

=== Diploma thesis ===
- Petra Forstová, Activities of the Šmidrové Group in the 1950s, Bachelor thesis, MUNI Brno, 2008
- Michaela Žáková, Jaroslav Vožniak and the cycle of icons for Jablonec Jewellery (1967-1968), Bachelor thesis, SDU, FF MUNI Brno, 2020
- Elisabeth Štimecová, Portrait of a Friend. Painter and graphic artist Jaroslav Vožniak (1933-2005) in the context of the work of Theodor Pištěk (1932), Master's thesis, SDU, Faculty of Arts MUNI Brno, 2020
