= Suchodol, Czech Republic =

Suchodol
- Municipality
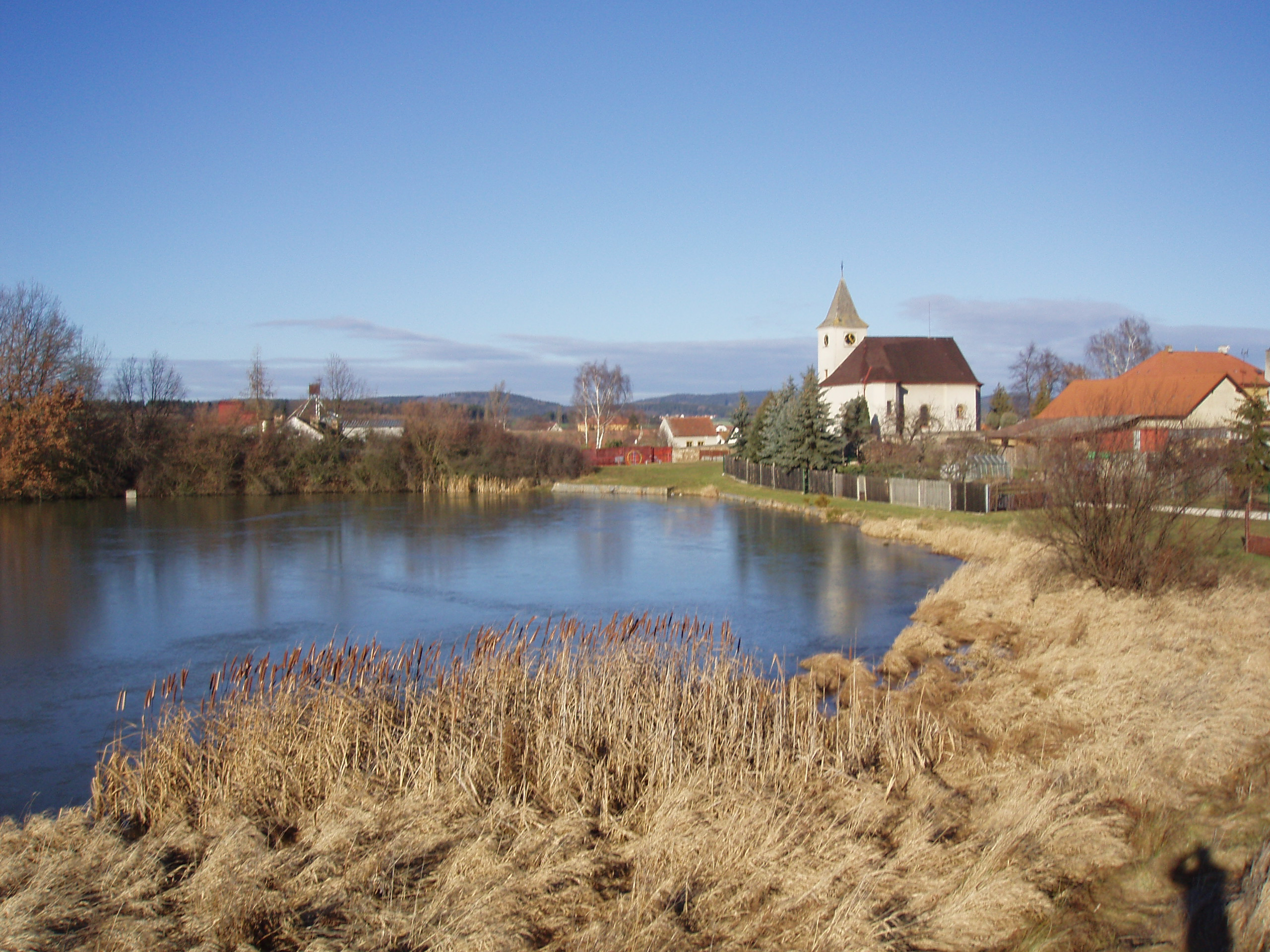
- Nelibec pond

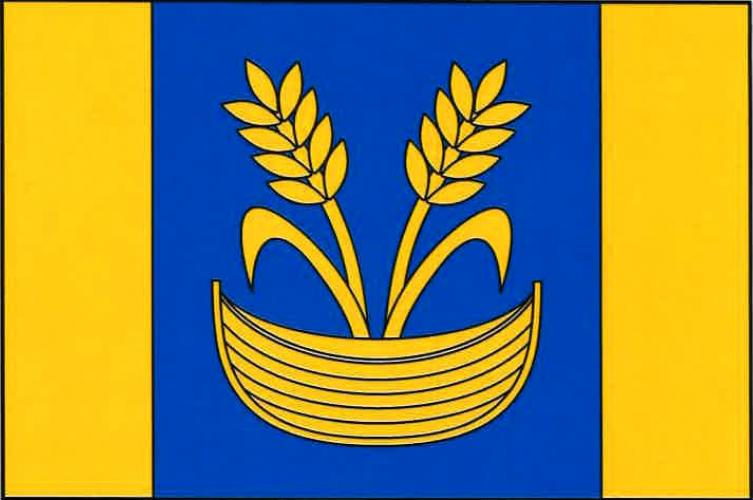
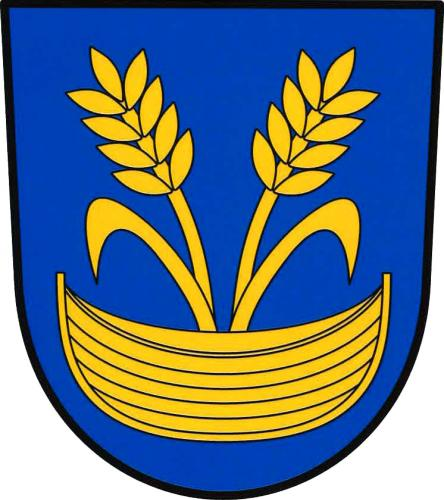
- Flag Coat of arms

- Location in the Czech Republic
- Coordinates: 49°43′27″N 14°4′57″E
- Country: Czech Republic
- Region: Central Bohemian
- District: Příbram
- First mentioned: 1360

Area
  - Total: 6.48 km^{2} (2.50 sq mi)
- Elevation: 447 m (1,467 ft)

Population (2026-01-01)
  - Total: 434
  - Density: 67.0/km^{2} (173/sq mi)
- Time zone: UTC+1 (CET)
  - Summer (DST): UTC+2 (CEST)
- Postal code: 261 01
- Website: www.obecsuchodol.cz

Suchodol is a municipality and village in Příbram District in the Central Bohemian Region of the Czech Republic. It has about 400 inhabitants.

== Administrative division ==
Suchodol consists of two municipal parts (in brackets population according to the 2021 census):

- Suchodol (304)
- Líha (94)

== Etymology ==
The name is derived from suchý důl, i.e. 'dry valley'.

== Geography ==
Suchodol is located about 6 kilometres (4 mi) northeast of Příbram and 39 km (24 mi) southwest of Prague. It lies in the Brdy Highlands. The highest point is the hill Na Vartě at 572 m (1,877 ft) above sea level. A system of three small fishponds is located in the village.

== History ==
The first written mention of Suchodol is from 1360. Líha was first mentioned in 1336. Líha was merged with Suchodol in 1960.

== Demographics ==
Historical population

| Year | Pop. | ±% |
|---|---|---|
| 1869 | 417 | — |
| 1880 | 336 | −19.4% |
| 1890 | 346 | +3.0% |
| 1900 | 357 | +3.2% |
| 1910 | 318 | −10.9% |

| Year | Pop. | ±% |
|---|---|---|
| 1921 | 330 | +3.8% |
| 1930 | 339 | +2.7% |
| 1950 | 278 | −18.0% |
| 1961 | 255 | −8.3% |
| 1970 | 241 | −5.5% |

| Year | Pop. | ±% |
|---|---|---|
| 1980 | 260 | +7.9% |
| 1991 | 247 | −5.0% |
| 2001 | 275 | +11.3% |
| 2011 | 342 | +24.4% |
| 2021 | 398 | +16.4% |

Source: Censuses

== Transport ==
The I/18 road (the section from Příbram to Sedlčany) briefly passes through the southern part of the municipality. The D4 motorway from Prague to Písek runs along the eastern municipal border just outside the municipality.

Part of the area of Příbram Airport is situated in the territory of Suchodol.

== Sights ==
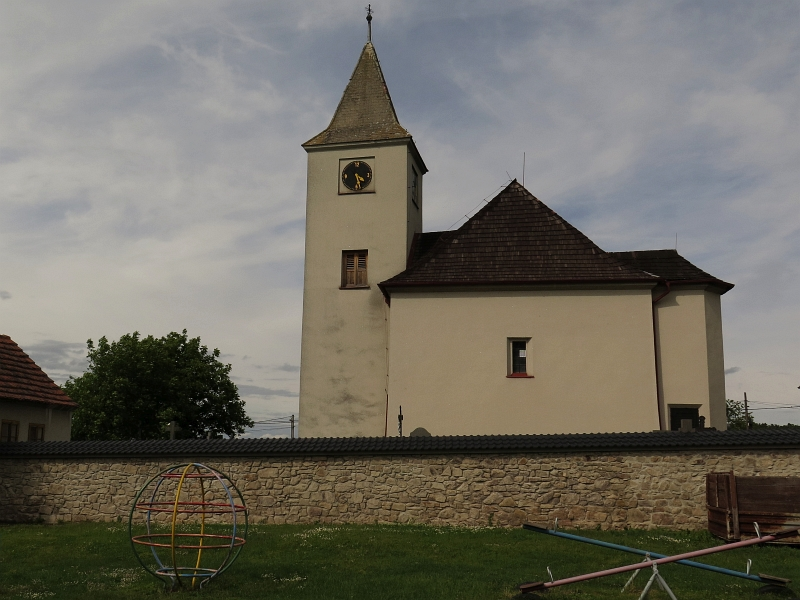
Church of Saint Luke

The main landmark of Suchodol is the Church of Saint Luke. The church is of unknown age, probably built in the second half of the 12th century. Its current appearance is the result of an early Baroque reconstruction from the second half of the 17th century.
