= Czech Informel =

Czech Informel is described as a current of expressive structural abstraction that emerged from specific local conditions at the turn of the 1950s and 1960s. It radically defined itself against all contemporary production and compromised creation and aestheticization of official art and became a turning point in the history of Czech art. Foreign critics appreciated the uniqueness of the works and wrote about a strong revolt of about thirty desperate avant-garde artists, which had no predecessor in Czechoslovakia. The term "informel" was used from 1945 by the French critic Waldemar-George and taken up and claimed by the painter Michel Tapié in the very title of the exhibition Signifiants de l´informel staged in Paul Facchetti´s studio in 1951. With international informel, which in Enrico Crispolti's conception includes a very heterogeneous group of artistic forms ranging from tachism to lyrical abstraction, is the Czech informel related only by some creative techniques.

== Definition of the term ==
The term "Czech Informel" was an afterthought and was defined only in the context of the 1991 exhibition and accompanying symposium. In the 1960s, the term structural abstraction was used, which according to Mahulena Nešlehová is inaccurate and misleading, because the term structure refers rather to an order that is internally organized. Informel, on the other hand, works with chance and the projection of spontaneous emotions and represents an "expressive material antipainting". It is not a gestural work, because in addition to striving for a strong expression embedded in the final shape of the finished work, one of the quality criteria was the perfect processing of material structures and the cultivation of artistic means. The striving for a definitive, finished and closed form of the work, which is seemingly in contrast to the openness and immediacy of the process of creation, has its background in cultural tradition and represents a specific characteristic of Czech works with features of the "national school". The finely articulated structure mirrors the complexity of the artist's psyche and the spiritual and ethical content of the work. In the post-war situation, the ostentatious destruction of the figure means at the same time its re-statement or even sacralization, the injured material becomes a metaphor of wounded humanity and a ritual body marked by stigmata. With the passage of time, informel appears to be an adequate artistic expression of the state of thought and consciousness of man in the post-war and so-called Cold War era, burdened with existential and subjective issues.

A typical common feature of the informel works was the need to break the boundary between painting and sculpture (relief) and the destruction of the conventions of form, the use of all means to physically objectify the inner feeling and to encode, record and petrify it, exploring the expressive possibilities of matter and image composition from disparate materials that expand into space and are taken out of their usual context or denied their usual function. The role of meaning is attributed to the void that surrounds the core. The process of creation itself involved the exposure of matter as well as its concealment and encryption into complex systems of shape and semantics, and evoked an escalation of emotion through the composition of materials. In the lengthy process of creation, the matter of the painting was touched, kneaded and destroyed, assemblages of different materials were layered, burned, disintegrated and rejoined, taking the form of almost magical artefacts with features of a certain "baroqueness". Found objects marked by time and human use, synthetic varnishes, sand, nails, wires, strings, sheets, rags, asphalt, pieces of wood served as materials used to create informel works. Important at the time was the newly produced and difficult to find synthetic material acronex (polyvinyl acetate, an artificially softened resin), which allowed the joining of disparate materials and the creation of high relief structures.

From a similar European production, which built on the aesthetic effect of raw materials and structures and lost intrinsic credibility through repetition, Czech Informel differed in emphasis on its existential basis. The principle of the permanent construction and destruction of the image was a reaction to the severity of the times and an attempt to penetrate to the deeper essence of creation, in which the birth involves at the same time the extinction of the previous and reflects the consciousness of the fragility of human existence itself. The hidden trace of the stories of their creators, living on the fringe of society, is imprinted on the artwork. The expression of the creative motion of thought was not abstract construction, but a direct contact with matter and through it with the earth. In the atmosphere of totalitarian dictatorship, with its vulgar propagandistic optimism, a sensitive person had to react only with total negation. Czech material expression, as a mystical version of symbolic self-torture, offers a glimpse into the gullet of death and the void. According to art historian Jan Kříž, in the Czech case it was expressionism inverted inwards and the threshold through which one entered the world of absolute independence and freedom was death. In pathological times, extreme revolt in art was paid for by the weakening of the practical will to live, as evidenced by the untimely deaths of Antonín Tomalík (1939-1968) and Vladimír Boudník (1924-1968) and the unfortunate death of Jiří Balcar (1929-1968). According to Ševčík, the magical creation of objects and the rituals associated with it, the movement towards transcendence and aesthetic cultivation are, on the contrary, a rescue from tragedy and a return to the certainty of a higher spiritual order - that is, rather a feedback to life.

As a symbol of coming to terms with an alienated world, a work of art may represent a revival of myth-making archetypes or an active gesture that objectifies and manifests a personal mental model. For the content of the message in a non-figurative expression, which lacks the presence of sensory visual elements, the carrier of the message of meaning (or the record of the artist's mental state) becomes a system of symbols and signs that cannot be directly deciphered, but can only be grasped sensually and unconsciously. The very moment of the completion of the work also represents for the artist the conclusion of the process of identification, which cannot be repeated or interpreted. The artwork as an image-object enriches the objective and spiritual reality of the world with a phenomenon that disturbs with its rationally ungraspable existence and stimulates the viewer to search for meaning and significance. It has a special magical attraction that does not allow us to pass it by unobserved and not to remain affected by it. The works of Czech Informel are close to each other in their heavy monochrome uncolouring and rigorous conception of the expressive material structures.

The artistic expression, referred to as "Czech informel", concentrates the essential features of Czech art in both a positive and negative sense. According to Milan Knížák, it has a parallel with Czech art of the second half of the 19th century in the degree of pathos, accentuated literariness and a kind of strange "material" patriotism.

=== Photographic informel ===
Non-figurative photographs depicting formlessness, randomness, disorganization, when by getting close to the object and inside its frame the photographer deliberately cancels the context and the possibility of orientation, can be considered as a precursor of painting and sculpture informel. The more concretely the matter is depicted, the more it becomes abstract and similar to the non-figurative textures of paintings. Walls are a frequent subject of photography, offering a parallel between totalitarian regimes and prisons. Surrealist origins are intertwined with existentialism in the central theme of death - in the subjects of tombstones, stelae, burnt holes, in the setting of junkyards and graveyards of things. The oscillation between inward penetration and reverse pressure is manifested by a focus on the layering and peeling of the surface of matter, the cracks, crevices, bulges and protrusions. The aesthetics of banality, which in its most radical position depicts indifferent nothingness as an aesthetic object, has its origins in surrealism. The humanistically binding and morally imperative message of Informel, which was born out of feelings of anxiety and threat, is the courage to face a difficult social situation and to take even considerable personal risks. Among other things, existentialism was a defense of individualism against the state's dictate to collectivism.

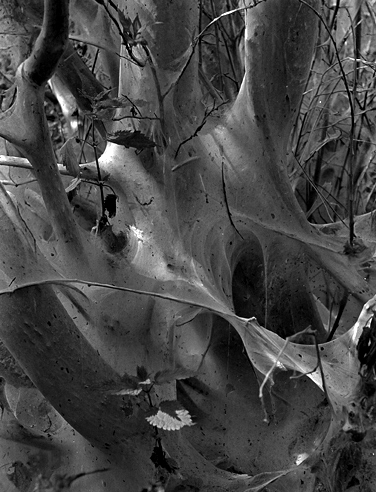
Karel Kuklik from the series Polluted Landscape I, 1959

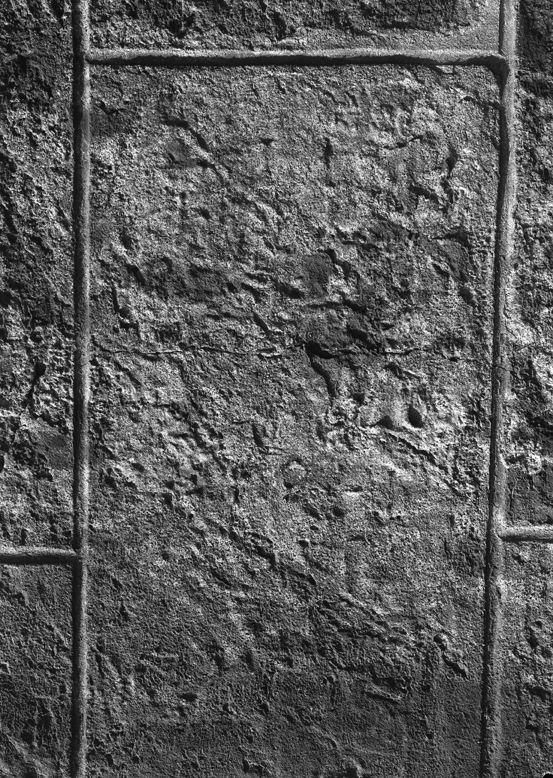
Karel Kuklik, Structure No. 3, 1960

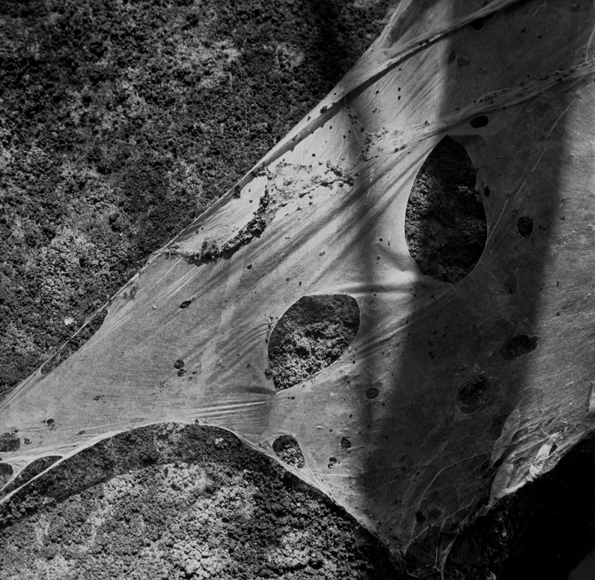
Karel Kuklik, from the series Polluted Landscape II, 1964

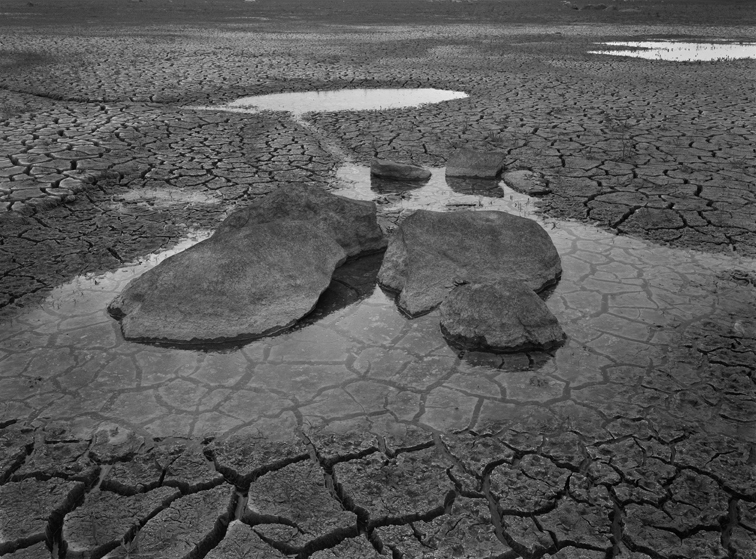
Karel Kuklik, from the series Landscape of Returns II, 1980

Another direction of photographic informel is represented by experiments with photographic emulsion, which create completely artificial textures. This is the case, for example, of Miloš Koreček's fokalks and some works by Miroslav Hák, Čestmír Janošek or Běla Kolářová.

== History ==
In the history of Czech art one can hardly find a phenomenon, similar to the emergence of an authentic Czech structural abstraction movement at the turn of 1959 and 1960. This current, with its artistic and moral consistency, created a certain point of ultimate radicalism that Czech art lacked before.

Czech Informel represents a very short and precisely timed period and a narrow circle of artists, mostly students or recent graduates of the Academy of Fine Arts. According to Aleš Veselý, the common starting point was a rejection of painting and a leaning towards gestural-expressive abstraction. Strong influences were extra-artistic stimuli, such as the works of Franz Kafka, Albert Camus, James Joyce or Ladislav Klíma, and the absurdist texts of Samuel Beckett, serial and punctual music (Karlheinz Stockhausen, Krzysztof Penderecki), electronic music by Edgard Varèse, as well as discoveries in physics and mathematics (Heisenberg, Wiener). Among foreign art, about which Czech artists had only fragmentary information, they felt a kinship with the Art brut of Jean Dubuffet. They knew Alberto Burri´s compositions of stitched jute sacks, the abstract relief textures of Jean Fautrier and Manolo Millares, material painting by Antoni Tàpies, metal reliefs by Zoltán Kemény, sculptures by Eduardo Paolozzi, Lynn Chadwick and Kenneth Armitage. Inspiration also came from the environment of the neglected, dilapidated and greyish Prague houses and streets of the 1950s.

This artistic phenomenon arose spontaneously in a circle of several individuals who were not bound by a shared program, but only by a similar spiritual sensibility. The founders sharply opposed not only the false ideological doctrine of "socialist realism" and the demand to depict reality with light, fresh technique in exultant colours, but also the entire contemporary production of the declined offshoots of impressionism and fauvism, or the tame modernist tendencies cultivated by the groups Máj 57, Trasa or UB 12. In the feverish atmosphere of the time, the degree of authenticity was decided in the months and weeks between two private exhibitions called Confrontation - the first in March 1960 in the studio of Jiří Valenta and the second in October 1960 in the studio of Aleš Veselý. In the summer of 1960, an impromptu exhibition was prepared in Jiří Valenta's studio for foreign critics visiting Prague on their way back from the AICA congress in Poland. As a result, several articles on the phenomenon of Czech informel were published in important foreign journals.

The public exhibitions of 1964 in Nová síň Gallery (Exhibition D) and 1965 (Alšova síň UB) were more or less summarizing and concluded the lively phase of this period. In the following years, an element of a certain mannerism began to assert itself, and the original raw gesture turned into the production of aesthetic decoration. It is only subsequently that the surrealist background of Informel is mythologized in the texts of theorists, and the specificity of domestic work is considered to be the romantic tradition, symbolization and bizarre exclusivity. All artists from the founding generation of Czech Informel had already returned to figuration or other forms of artistic expression before the mid-1960s. The very rawness of informel opened up the space of avant-garde art of the 1960s, in which the influences of neo-Dadaism, Lettrism, Pop art and Op art, constructivist tendencies, action art, new figuration or the post-surrealist aesthetics of "strangeness" were applied.

The new younger generation around 1965 merely manipulates the surrealistic background without content and the necessary spirituality, replacing existential experience with banal metaphor. Their inclination towards non-figurative work is not determined by the need for a new message, but is merely a formal acceptance of a new abstract language or a paradoxical effort to express old content through new means.

== Artists ==
The founding personality and organizer of Confrontations is considered to be Jan Koblasa, in whose studio the first unofficial exhibition of his own works created in the previous four months took place in June 1959. The radical current of Czech Informel included the artists who took part in the first two exhibitions called Confrontations: Zdeněk Beran, Vladimír Boudník, Čestmír Janošek, Jan Koblasa, Antonín Málek, Antonín Tomalík, Jiří Valenta, Aleš Veselý, Zbyšek Sion. Mikuláš Medek and Emila Medková were also invited to the Konfrontace exhibitions, but they refused to participate.

The wider circle of artists who leaned towards abstraction and were preparing to establish the Confrontation group in the 1960s, (Note: the Konfrontace (Confrontation) group was founded on 17 October 1961, but its application for admission to the official Union of Czech Visual Artists was rejected, as were repeated requests for exhibition dates. The group ceased to exist without having the opportunity to present itself publicly. Mahulena Nešlehová, 1997, p. 238) included Jiří Balcar, Zdeněk Beran, Václav Boštík, Vladimír Boudník, Hugo Demartini, Bedřich Dlouhý, Jan Hendrych, Josef Istler, Jiří Janeček, Čestmír Janošek, Olga Karlíková, Jan Koblasa, Jiří Kolář, Běla Kolářová, Jitka Kolínská, Jan Kotík, Karel Kuklík, Antonín Málek, Karel Malich, Pavla Mautnerová, Mikuláš Medek, Emila Medková, Jiří Mrázek, Ludmila Padrtová, Robert Piesen, Zbyněk Sekal, Zbyšek Sion, Václav Tikal, Antonín Tomalík, Jiří Valenta, Vladimír Vašíček, Aleš Veselý, Marián Čunderlík, Juraj Kočiš, and theoreticians Antonín Hartmann, Jan Kříž, Bohumír Mráz, Ludmila Vachtová, Dalibor Veselý.

Czech abstract art of the 1960s had its predecessors, but there is no direct connection with Czech informel. Isolated works of abstract art from the 1940s have their origins in surrealism (Toyen, Josef Istler, Ra Group). Abstract art can be found in the works of Zdenek Rykr, Pravoslav Kotík and Jan Kotík. Vladimír Boudník brought new expressive potential to Czech art with his "active" and "structural" prints in 1954–1959. Other names from the Confrontation group (Istler, Kotík, Tikal) also represent a connection with the work of the 1950s. At the end of the 1950s and in 1960, abstract monotypes and tachistic or cast paintings were created by Jan Kubíček, Jan Koblasa, Čestmír Janošek, Jiří Balcar and Robert Piesen.

Radical structural abstraction influenced a wide range of artists and, in addition to the participants of the Confrontations, in the early 1960s, the informel was adopted also by Karel Nepraš, Bedřich Dlouhý, Jaroslav Vožniak, Pavel Nešleha, Naděžda Plíšková, Jaroslav Hovadík, Miloslav Hladký, Petr Bareš, Dana Puchnarová, Jaroslav Šerých, Jan Steklík, Eva Janošková, James Janíček, Jan Švankmajer, Jan Hladík, Vladimír Suchánek, Lubomír Přibyl, Hugo Demartini, etc. Some photographers (Stanislav Benc, Čestmír Krátký, Karel Kuklík) took part in the Confrontation exhibitions, and the informel can also include, for example, the graduate film by Václav Mergl, based on the animation of formless masses. The explosive charge of negation represented by structural abstraction resonated strongly in Slovakia, and the first Confrontation took place in Bratislava in 1961 at Jozef Jankovič studio. The initiators of other unofficial exhibitions (Bratislava Confrontations) were Eduard Ovčáček and Miloš Urbásek.

Zdenek Felix in 1965 lists Boudník, Medek, Istler and Piesen as founding figures. According to him, two currents emerged from the original Informel circle. The first of these, associated with radical structural abstraction, further developed the original relief-objects (Málek, Tomalík) and assemblages (Veselý) or moved on to figurative work (Koblasa, Valenta, Sion). Čestmír Janošek incorporates elements of neo-Dada and pop-art into his works. In the second list he included artists of the phantasy tendency (Nepraš, Dlouhý, Vožniak), who follow the surrealism of Janoušek, Štyrský, Toyen and Tikal.

In the second half of the 1960s, art historians became disinterested in Informel, and in 1968 Tomalík, Boudník and Balcar tragically died. After the Warsaw Pact invasion of Czechoslovakia, Koblasa, Valenta, Málek, Sekal, Kotík, Čestmír and Eva Janošek, Hovadík emigrated abroad. Robert Piesen and Pavla Mautnerová left Czechoslovakia before 1965. Those who remained in Czechoslovakia became undesirable to the regime and were sentenced to internal exile.

=== Exhibitions ===
- March 1960, Jiří Valenta's studio - Zdeněk Beran, Vladimír Boudník, Čestmír Janošek, Jan Koblasa, Antonín Málek, Antonín Tomalík, Jiří Valenta, Aleš Veselý, Italian guest Guido Biasi
- October 1960, studio of Aleš Veselý - Vladimír Boudník, Čestmír Janošek, Jan Koblasa, Václav Křížek, Antonín Málek, Zbyšek Sion, Antonín Tomalík, Jiří Valenta, Aleš Veselý, photographers Stanislav Benc, Karel Kuklík, Jiří Putta
- 1962 Argumenta I., Galerie sztuki nowocesnej Krzywe Koło in Warsaw - Jiří Balcar, Vladimír Boudník, Josef Istler, Jan Koblasa, Mikuláš Medek, Aleš Veselý, Robert Piesen (from the Polish side Marian Bogusz, Zbygniev Dłubak, Stefan Gierowski, Bronisłav Kierzkowski, Edward Krasiński, Hilary Kryzstofiak, Alfred Lenica, Teresa Pągowska, Henryk Stażewski, Jerzy Tchórzewski, Rajmund Ziemski)
- 1964 Exhibition D, Nová síň Gallery - Jiří Balcar, Vladimír Boudník, Josef Istler, Čestmír Janošek, Jan Koblasa, Mikuláš Medek, Karel Nepraš, Robert Piesen, Zbyněk Sekal, Jiří Valenta (artist), Aleš Veselý
- 1965 Konfrontace III, Alšova síň - Umělecká beseda - Vladimír Boudník, Miloslav Hotový, James Janíček, Čestmír Janošek, Antonín Málek, Pavel Nešleha, Zbyšek Sion, Antonín Tomalík, Jiří Valenta, photographers Stanislav Benc, Čestmír Krátký, Karel Kuklík
- 1991 Český informel. Průkopníci abstrakce z let 1957-1964 / Czech informel. Pioneers of Abstraction 1957–1964, Old Town Hall, Prague
- 1991 Antonín Tomalík: Výběr z díla 1957 - 1968 / Selected works 1957 - 1968, Old Town Hall, Prague
- 1991 Český informel. Strukturální fotografie, okruh bratislavských konfrontací a autoři mimo hlavní proud / Czech informel. Structural photography, the Bratislava confrontation circuit and authors outside the mainstream, Václav Špála Gallery, Prague
- 2015 Informel a jeho přesahy. Výstava z depozitáře / Informel and its overlaps. Exhibition from the depository, Gallery of Fine Arts in Cheb
- 2016 Informel - 60. léta ze sbírek Galerie výtvarného umění v Ostravě / Informel - 1960s from the collections of the Gallery of Fine Arts in Ostrava

=== Selected works ===
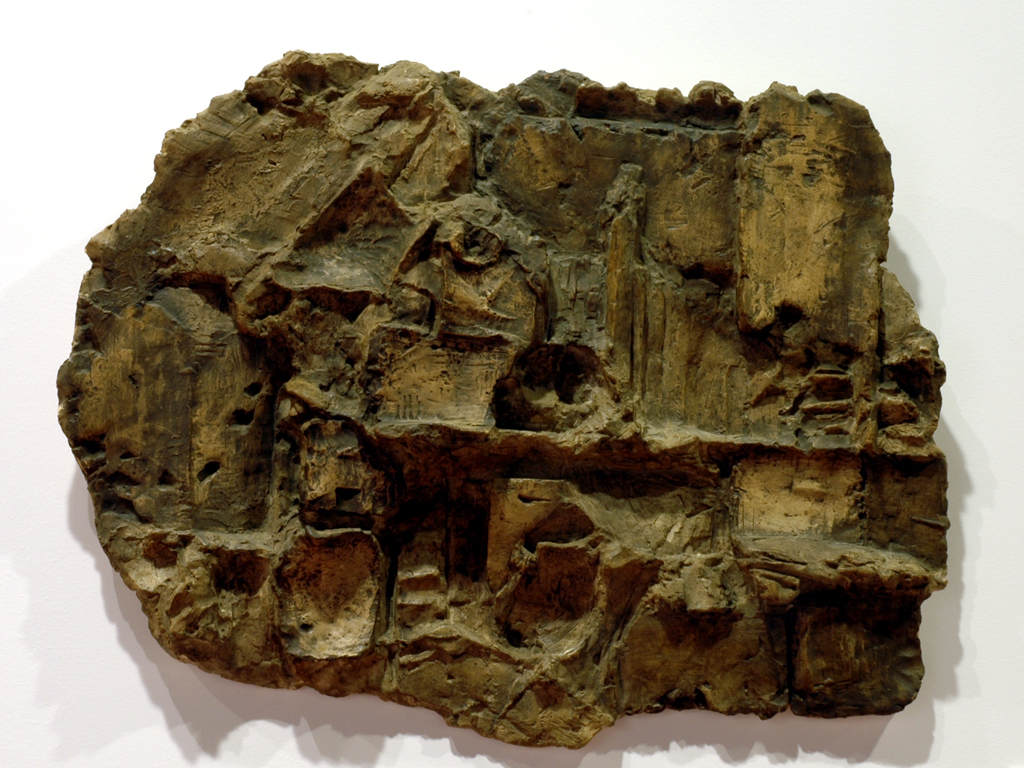
Jan Koblasa, Head, 1959

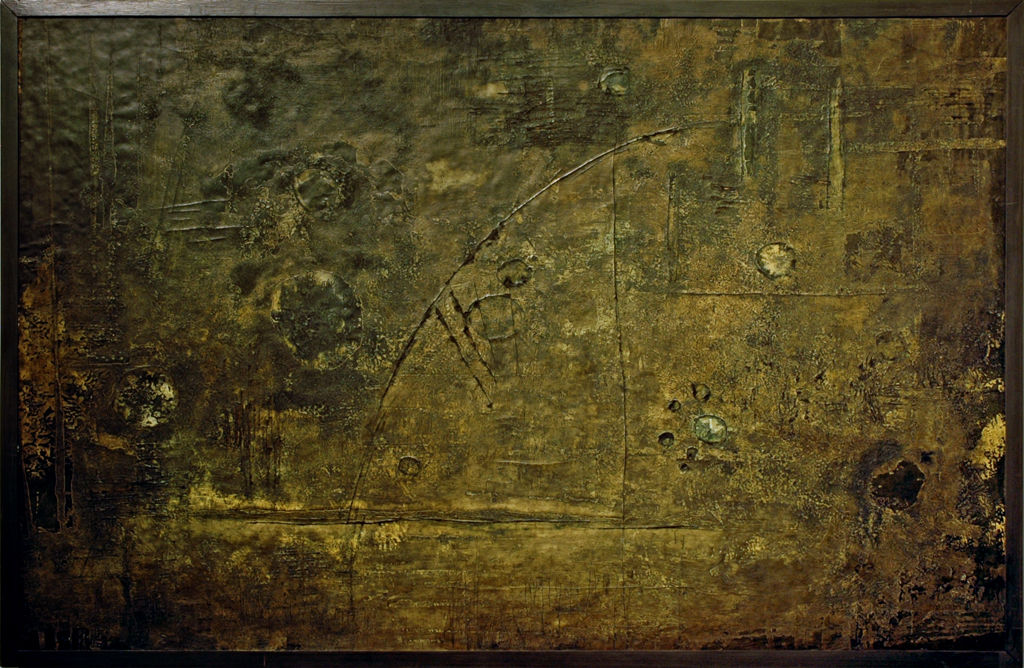
Jan Koblasa, Noli tangere circulos meos III, 1960

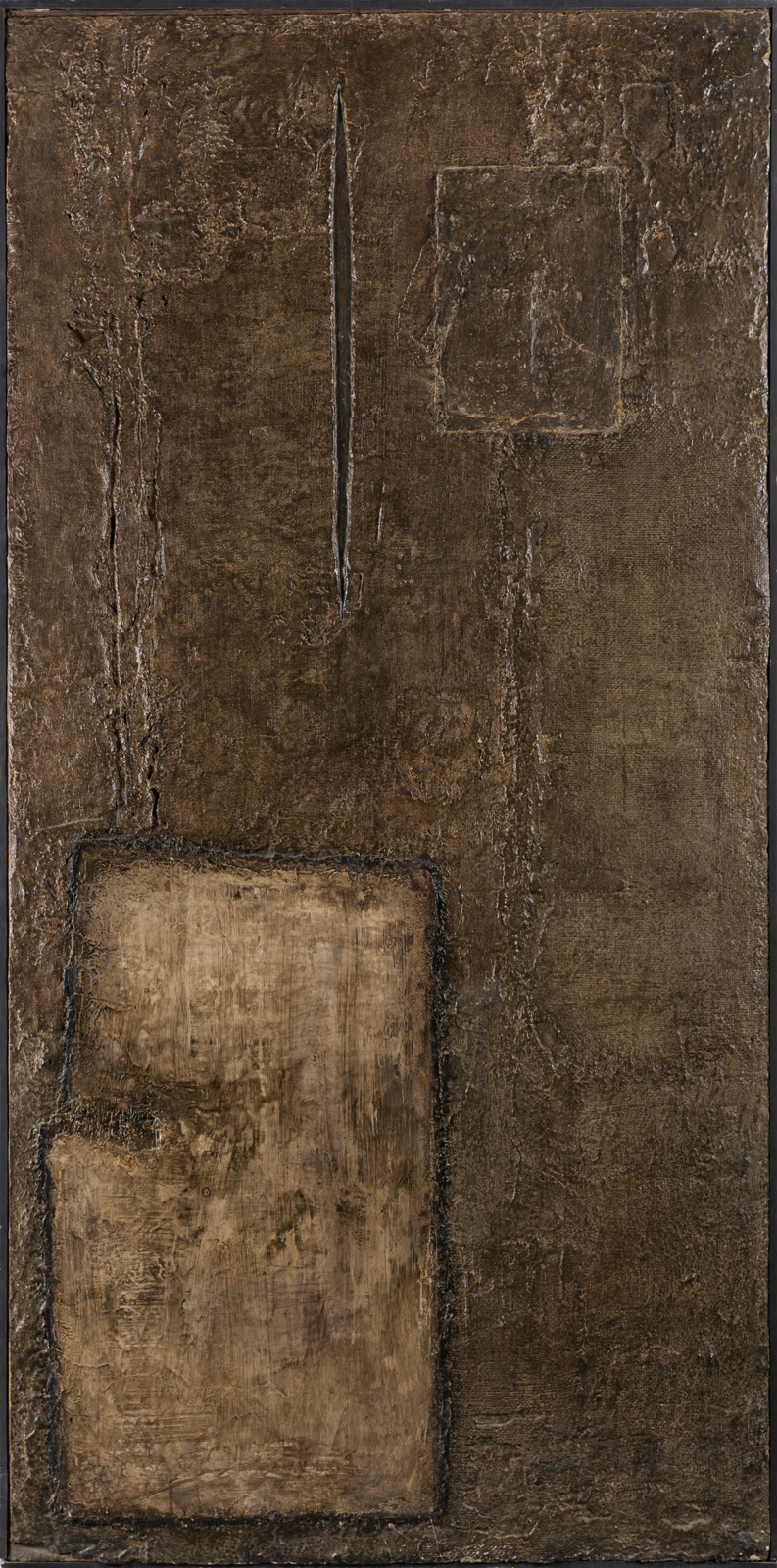
Jiří Valenta, Collage II (1960), Museum Kampa

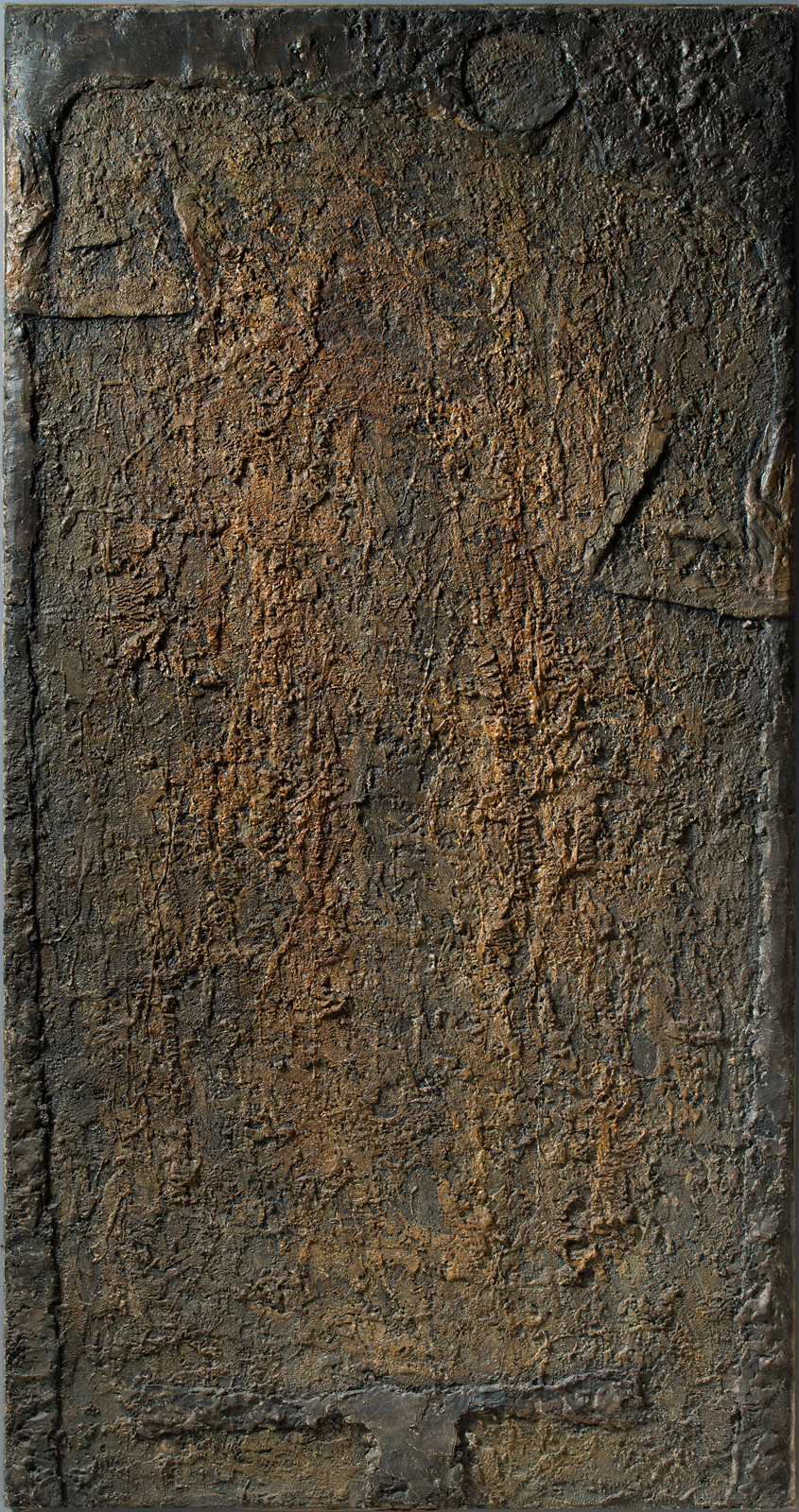
Jiří Valenta, Spirit of the Slain (1961), National Gallery in Prague

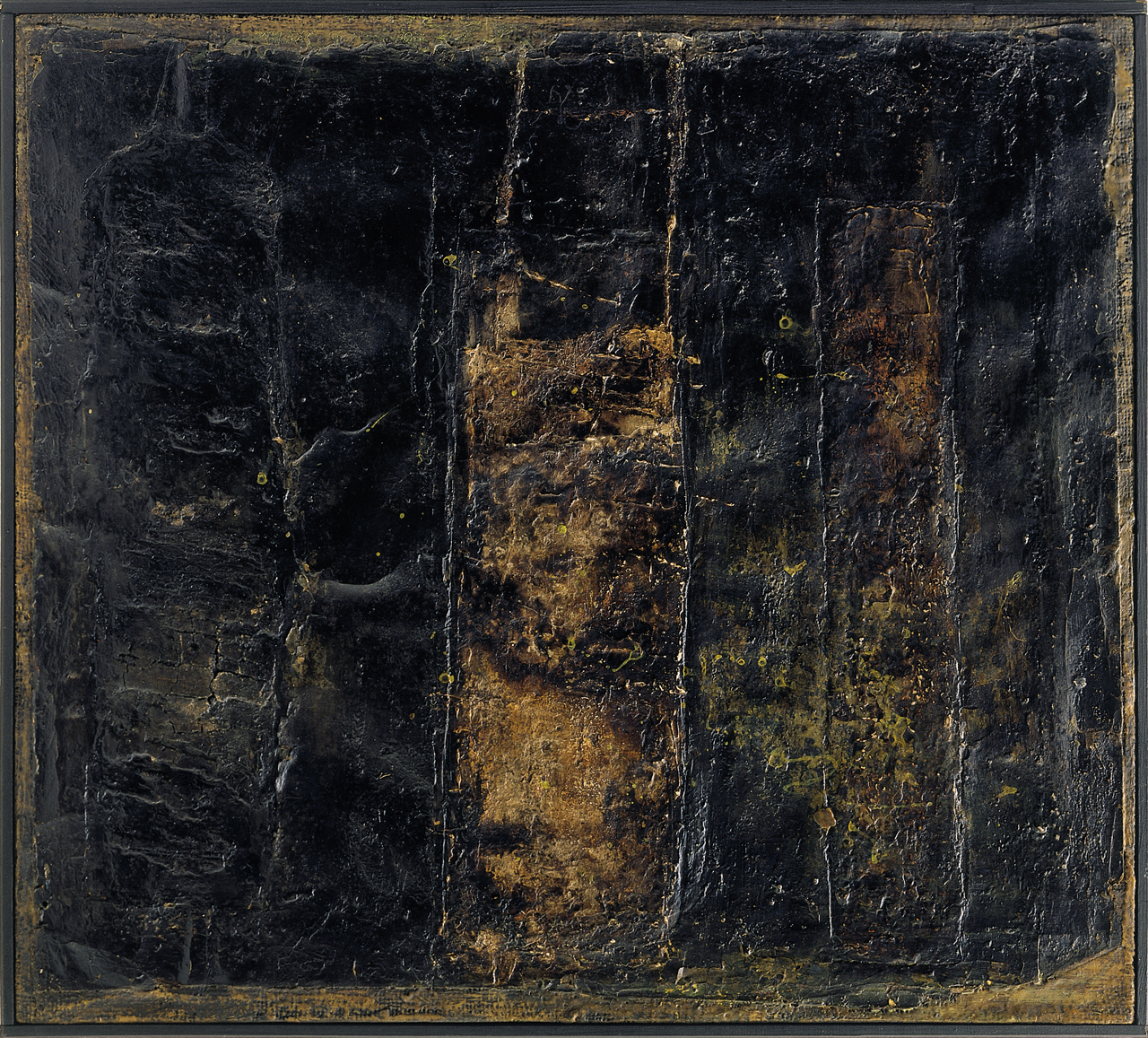
Zdeněk Beran, A hint of three figures I (1959-1961)

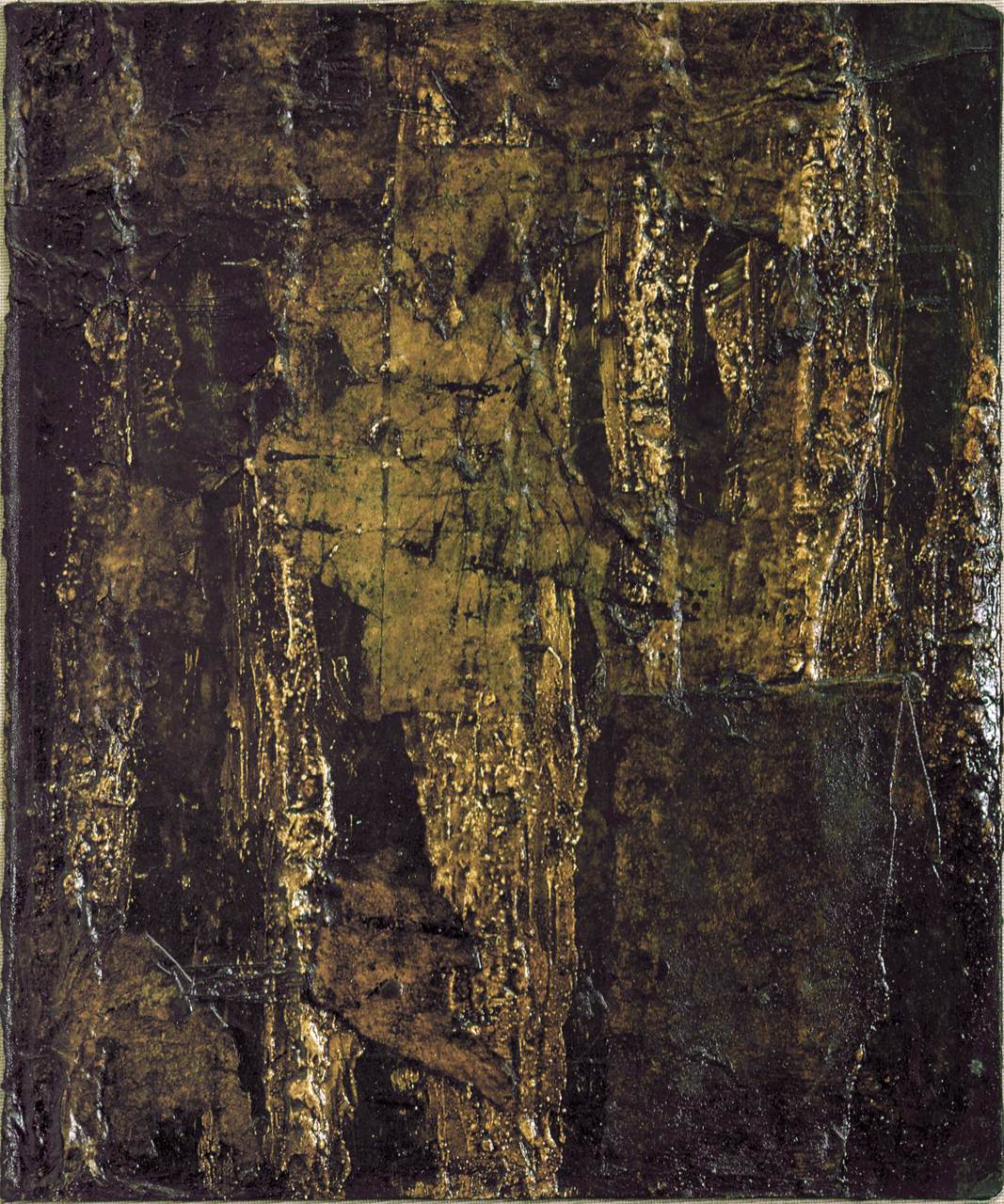
Zdeněk Beran, Study of Structure VI (1961)

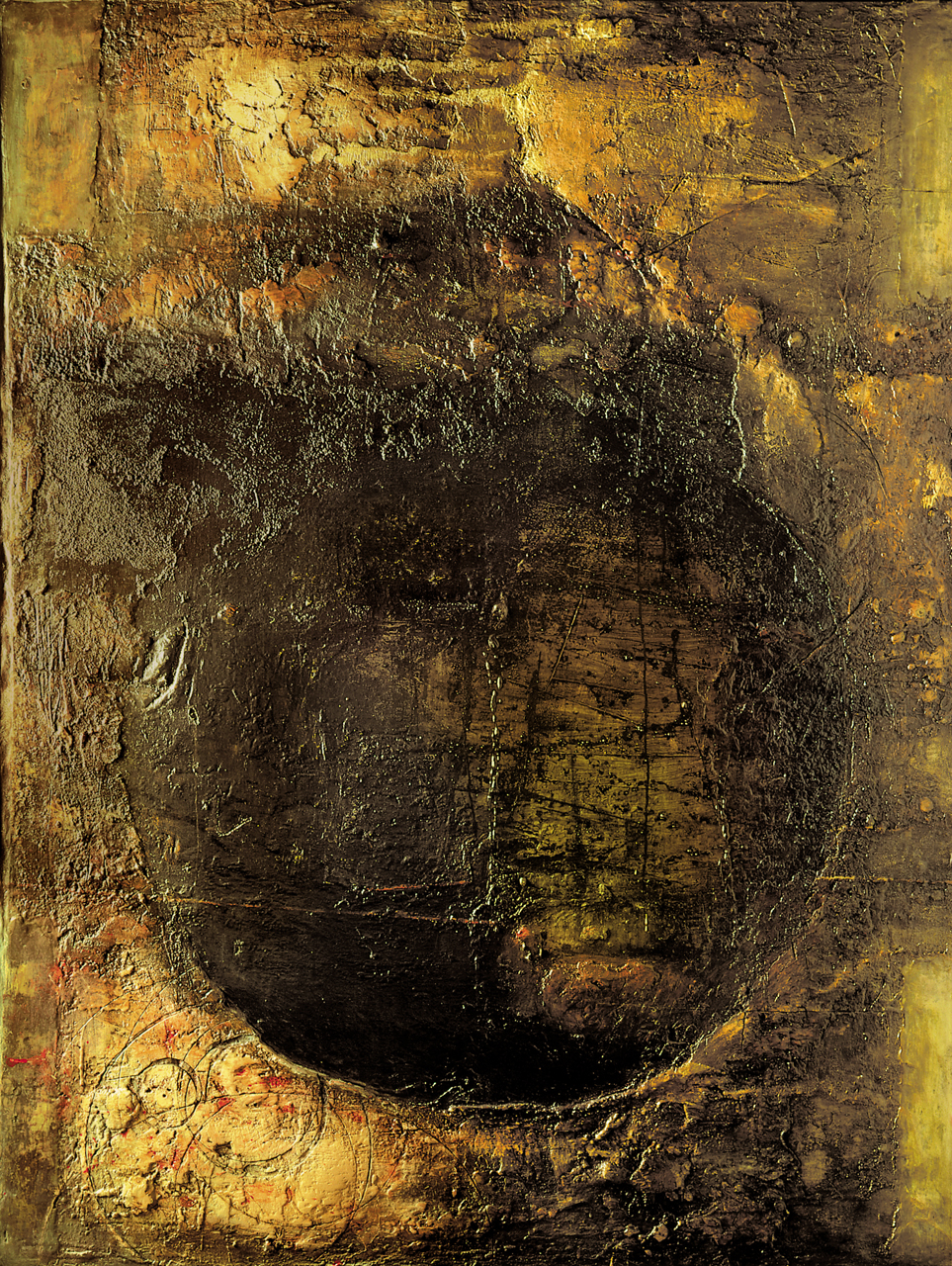
Zdeněk Beran, Big Red Structure (1963)

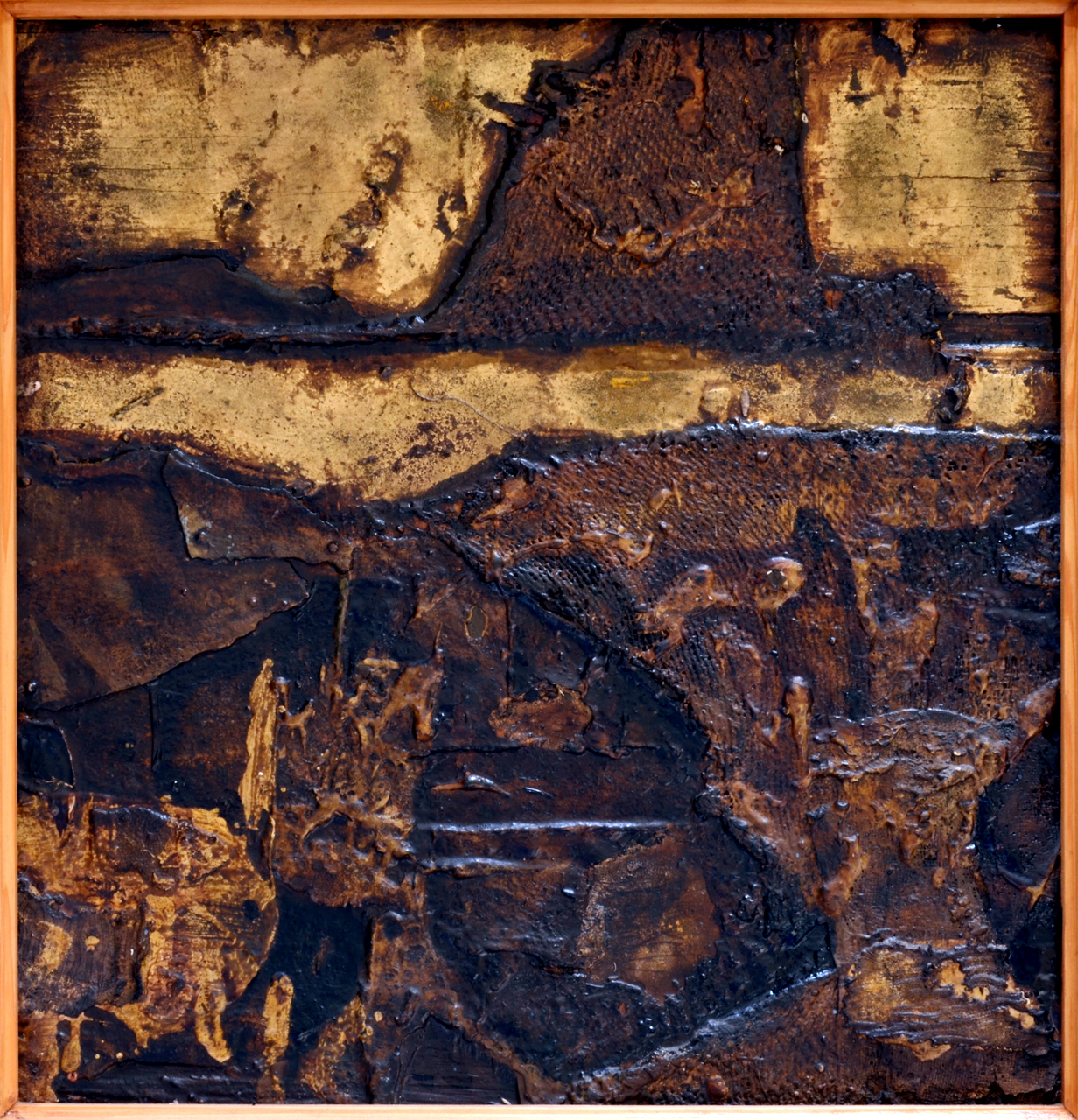
Zbyšek Sion, Archaeological Landscape, 1961

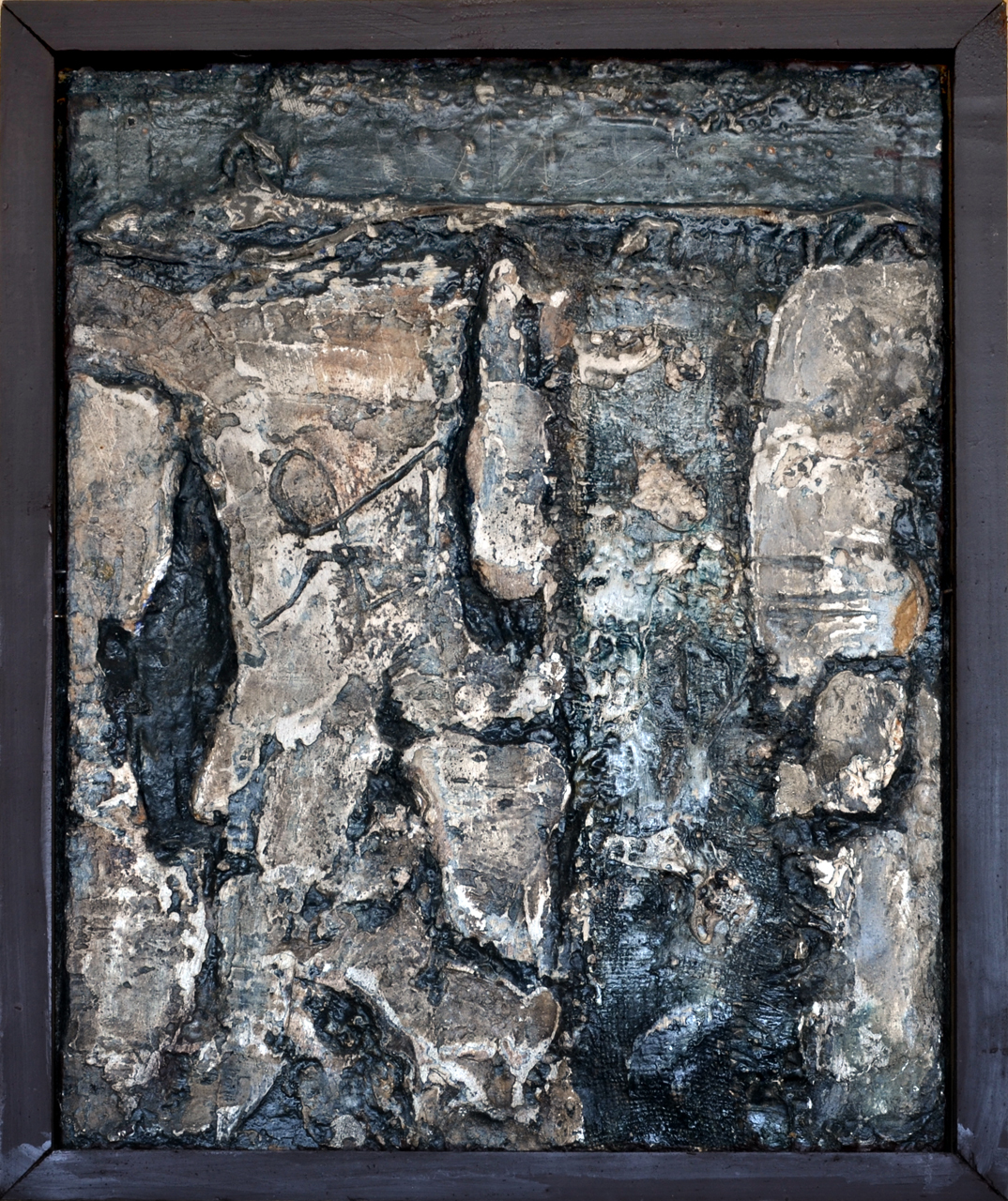
Zbyšek Sion, Untitled, 1961

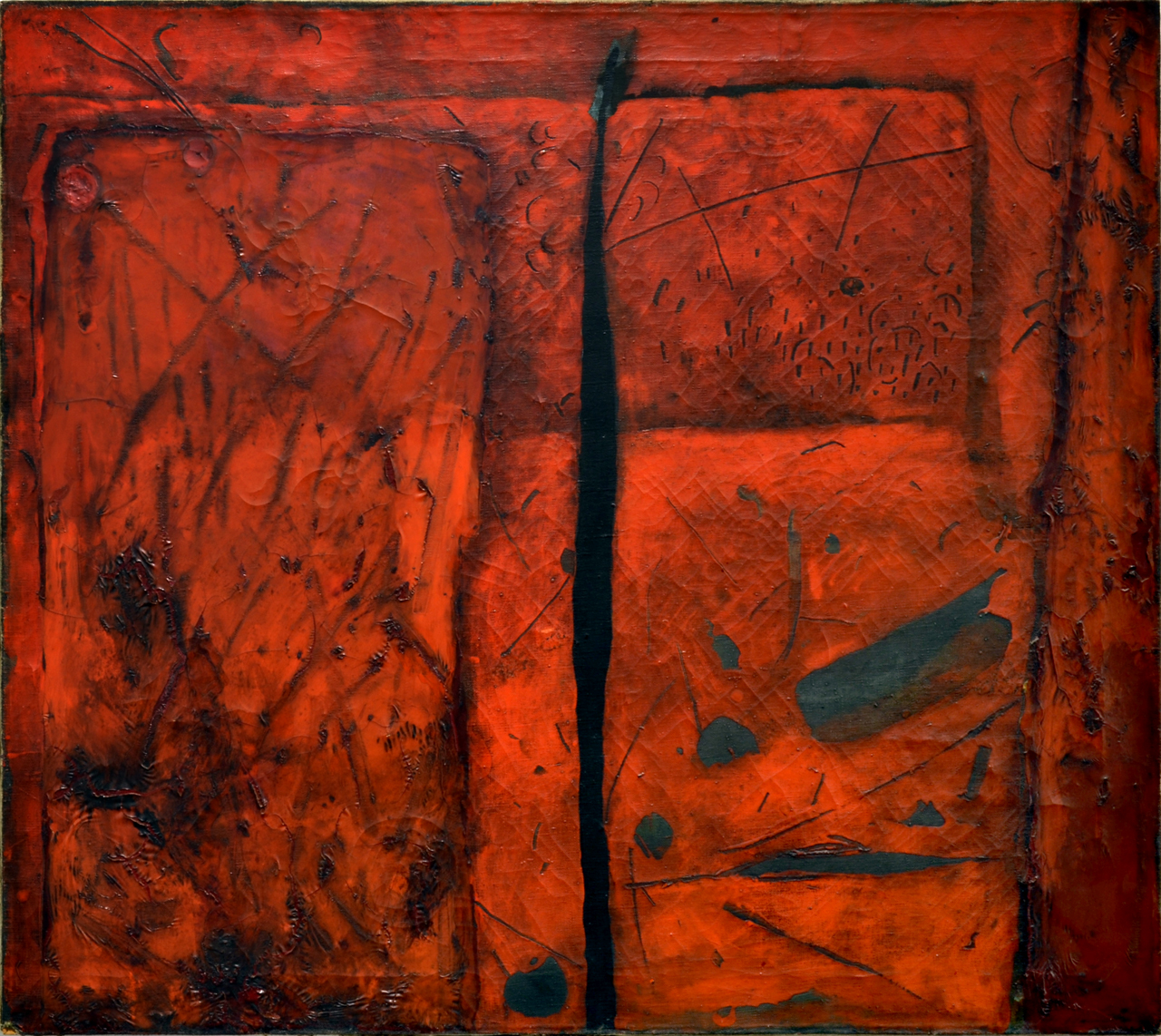
Jaroslav Vožniak, Red IV, 1961

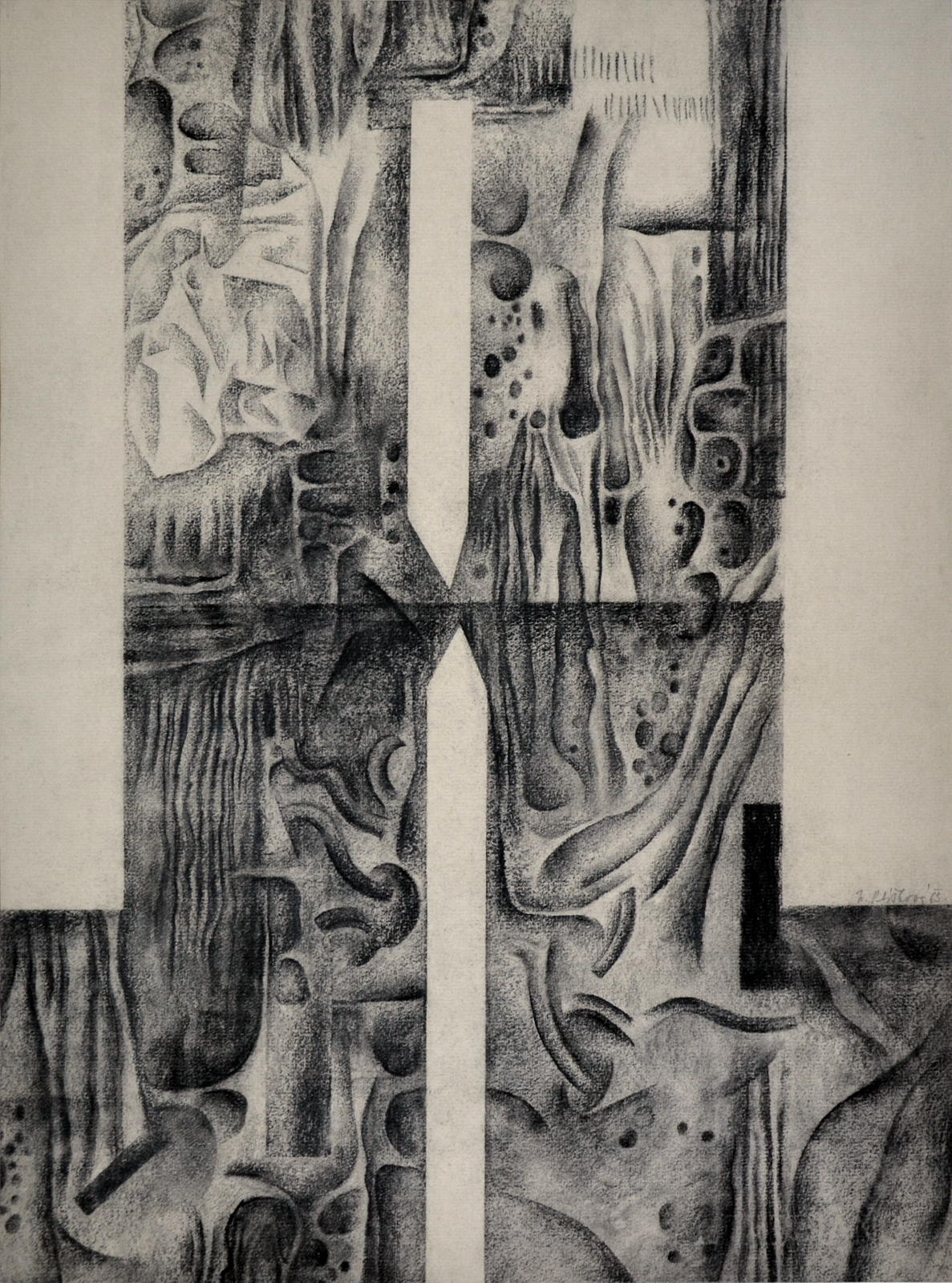
Naděžda Plíšková, Pairs, 1963

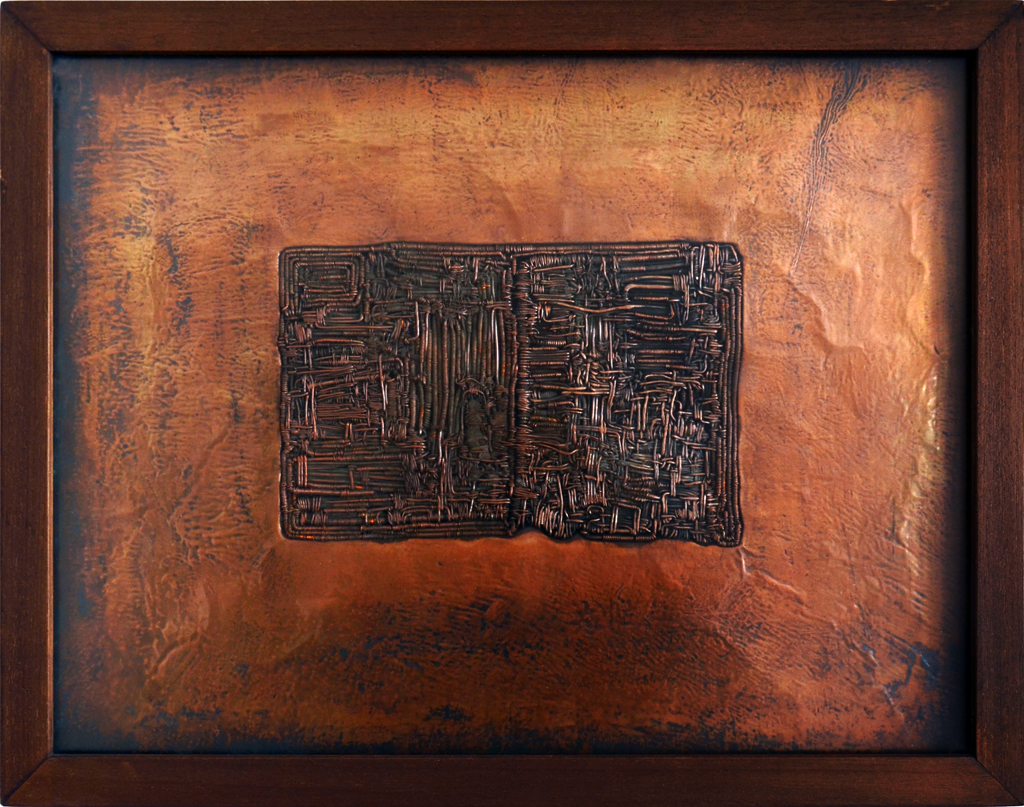
Zbyněk Sekal, Untitled, 1960s

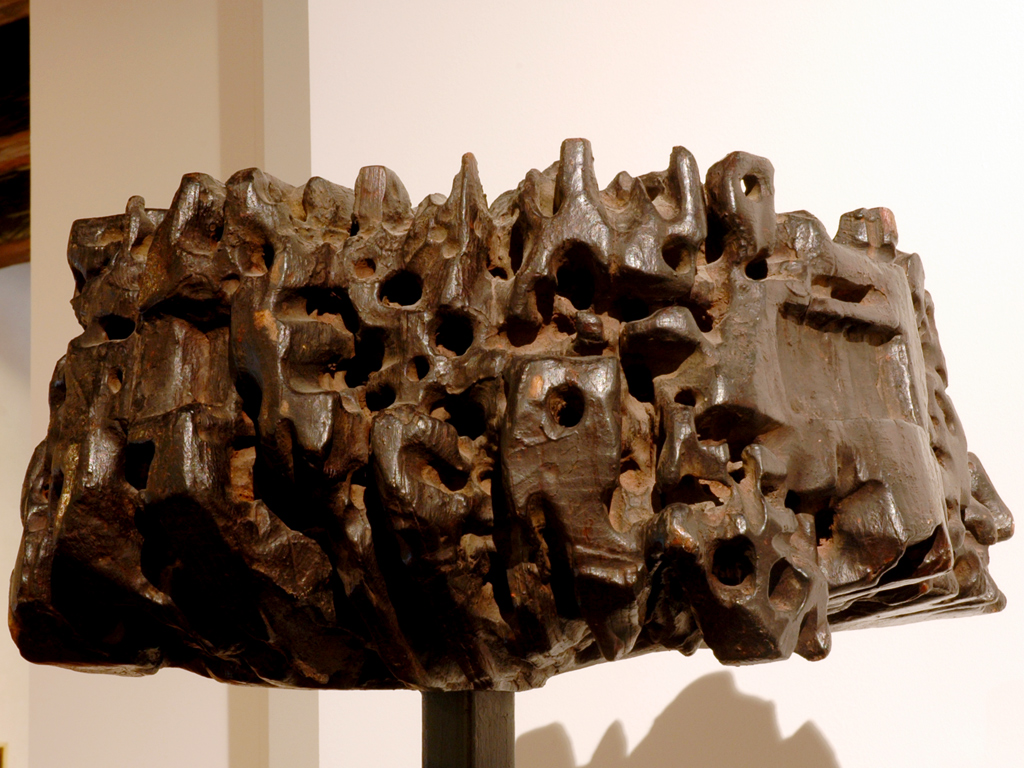
Jan Koblasa, Anointed Head, 1963

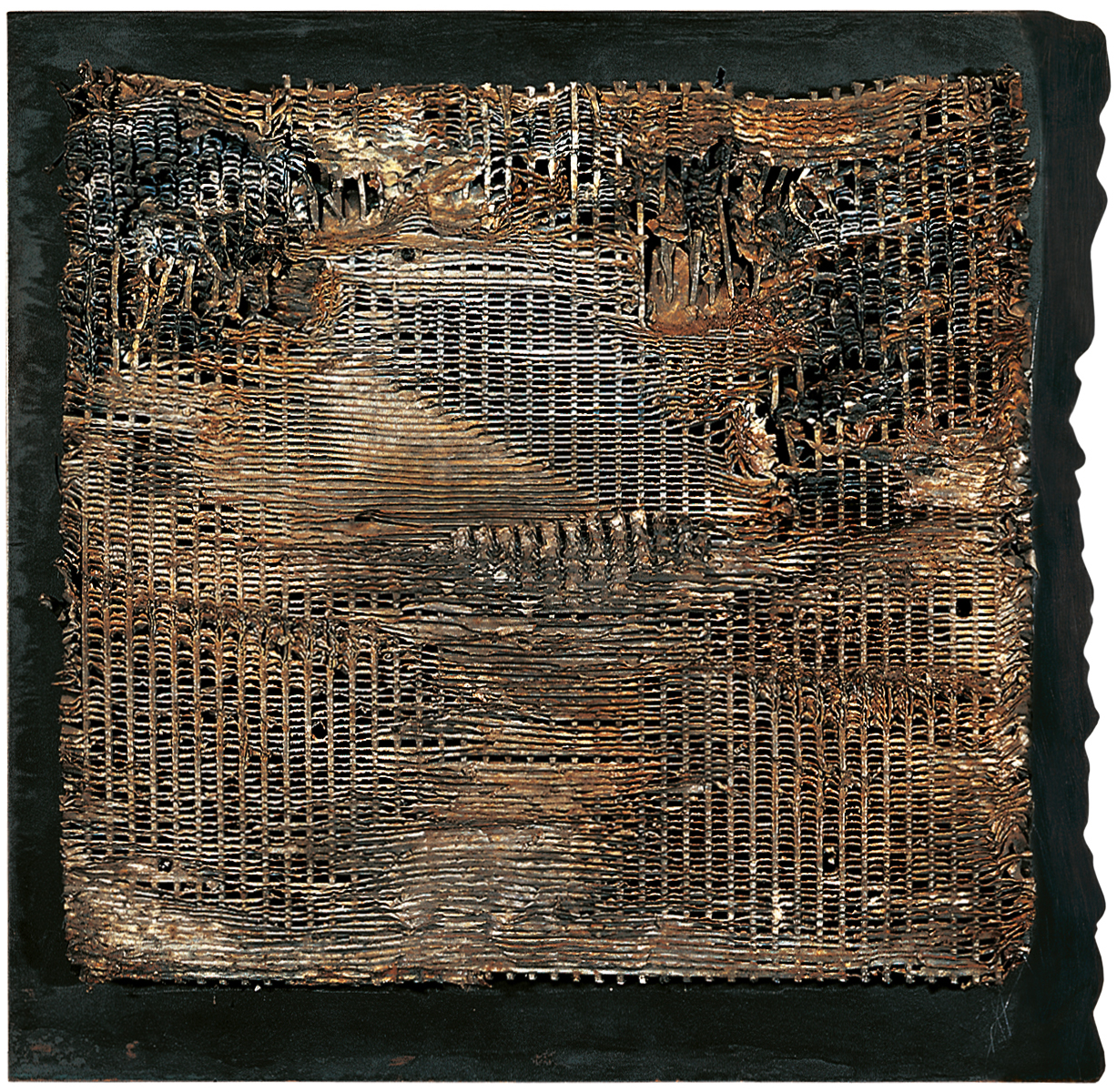
Theodor Pištěk, Notes of a Disappeared, 1963

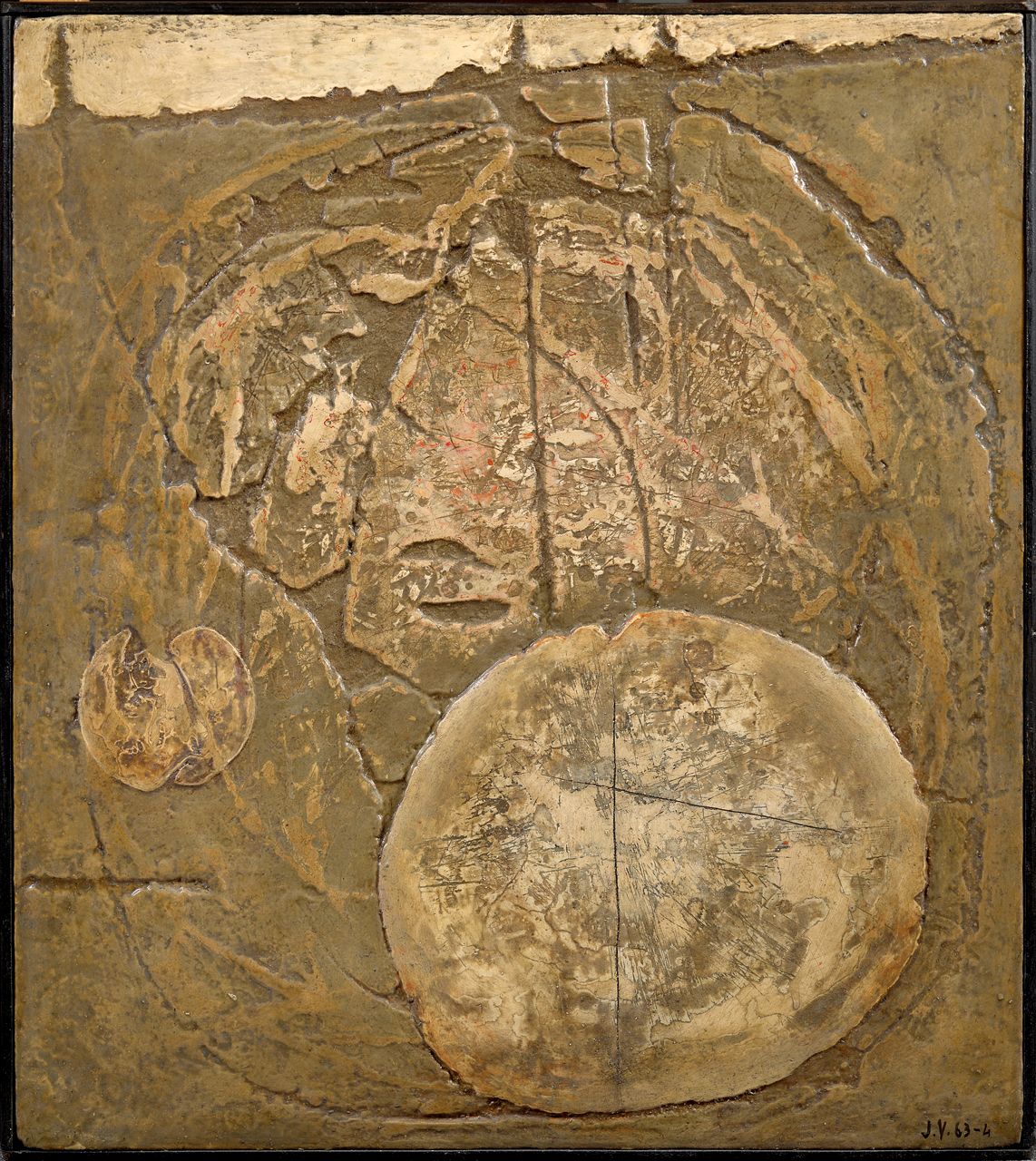
Jiří Valenta, Study II (1963-1964), GASK Kutná Hora

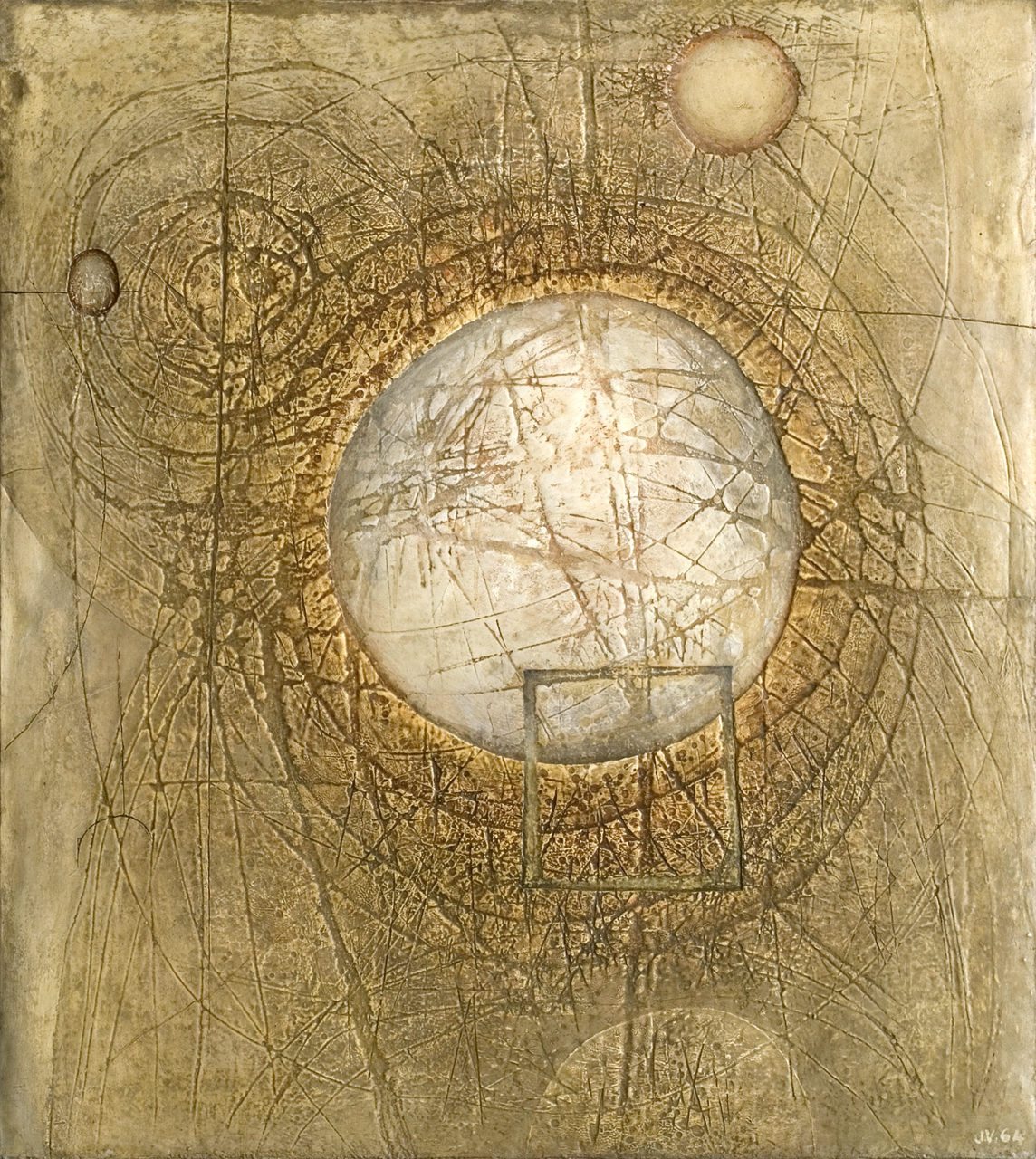
Jiří Valenta, Synthetic Tissue I (1964), GU Karlovy Vary

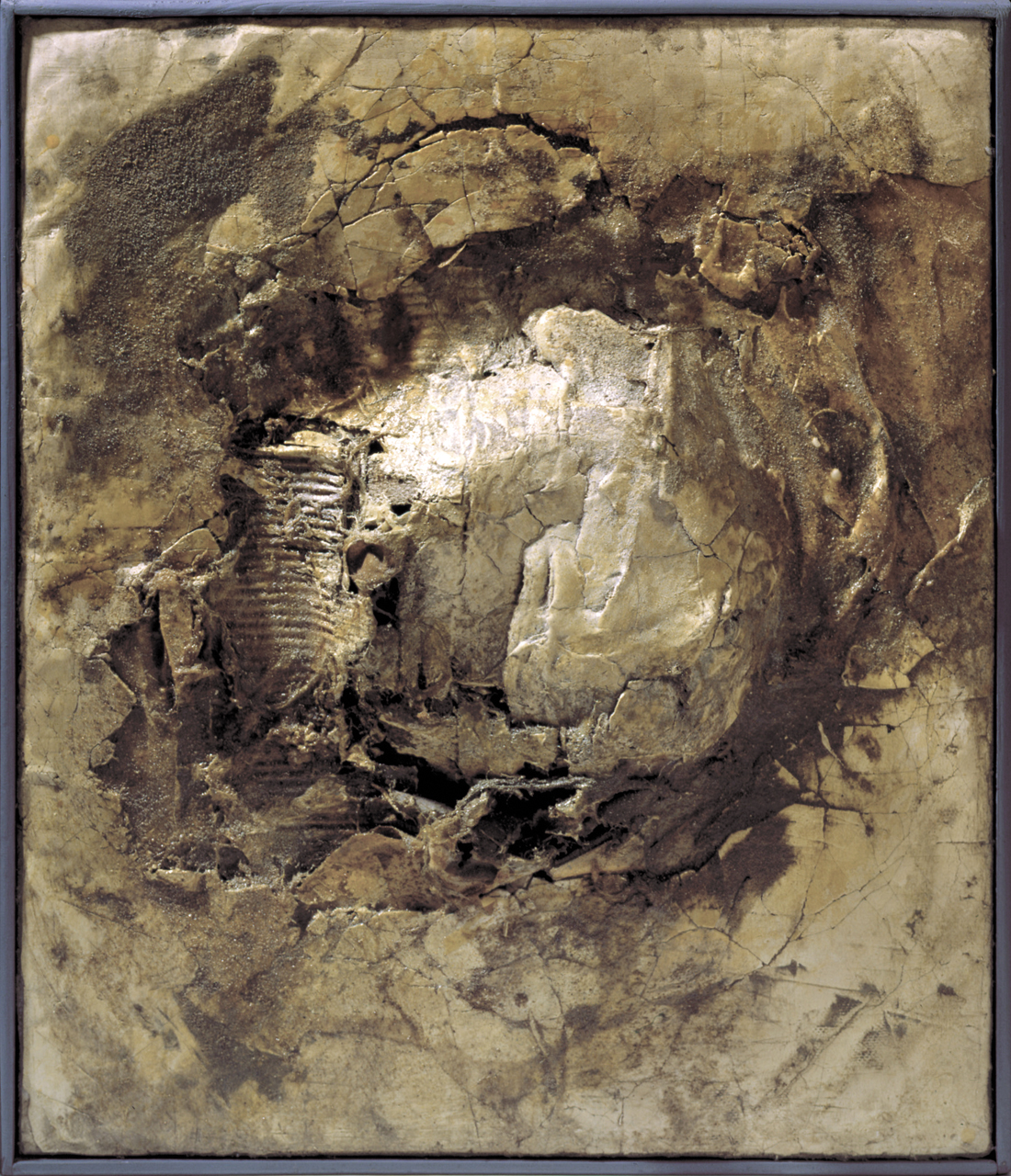
Zdeněk Beran, The Bulge (1965)

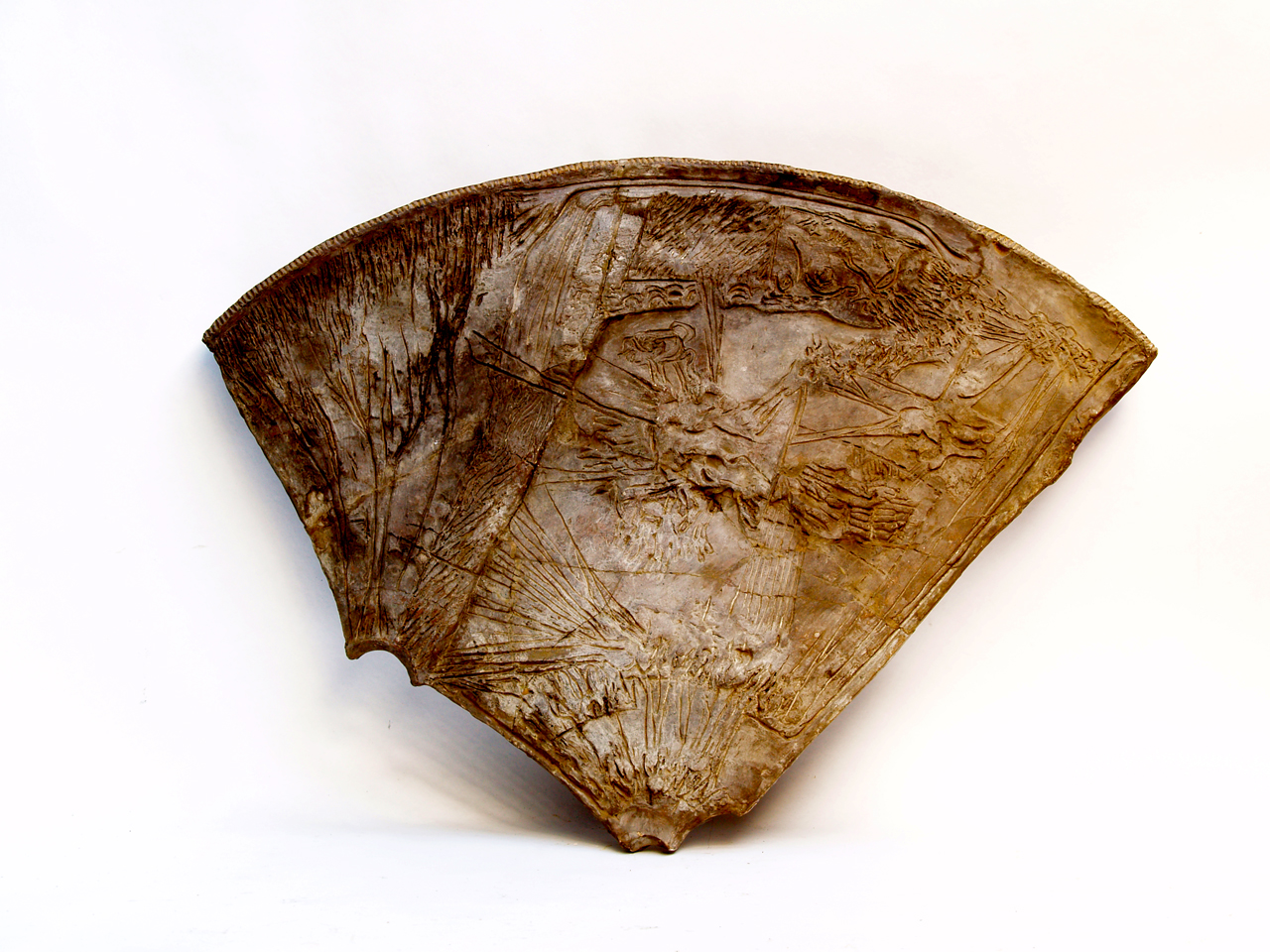
Karel Pauzer, Segment, 1965

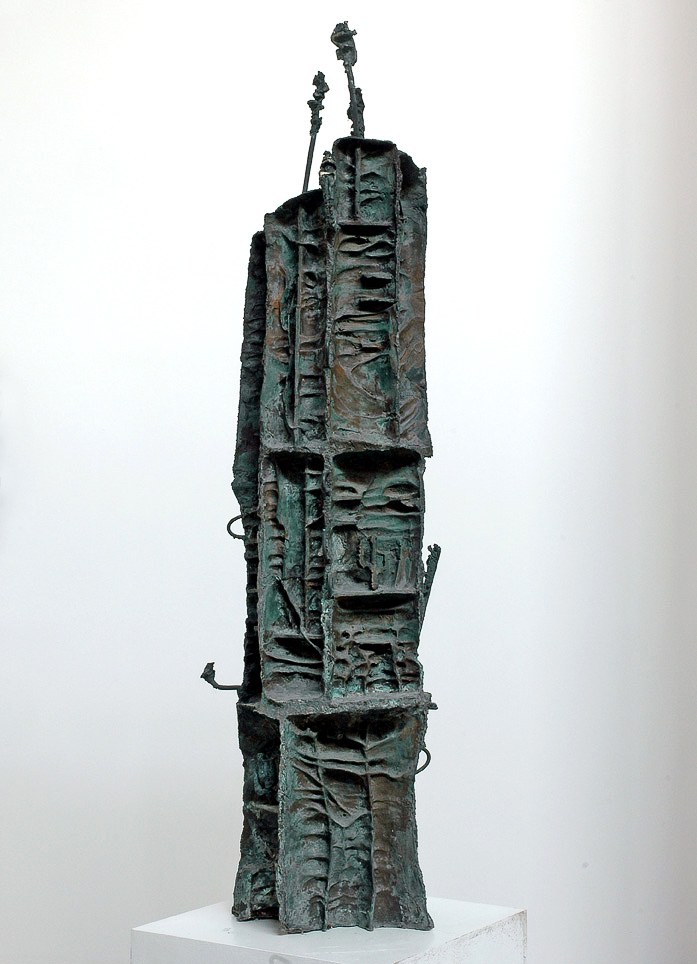
Karel Nepraš, Castle III, 1967

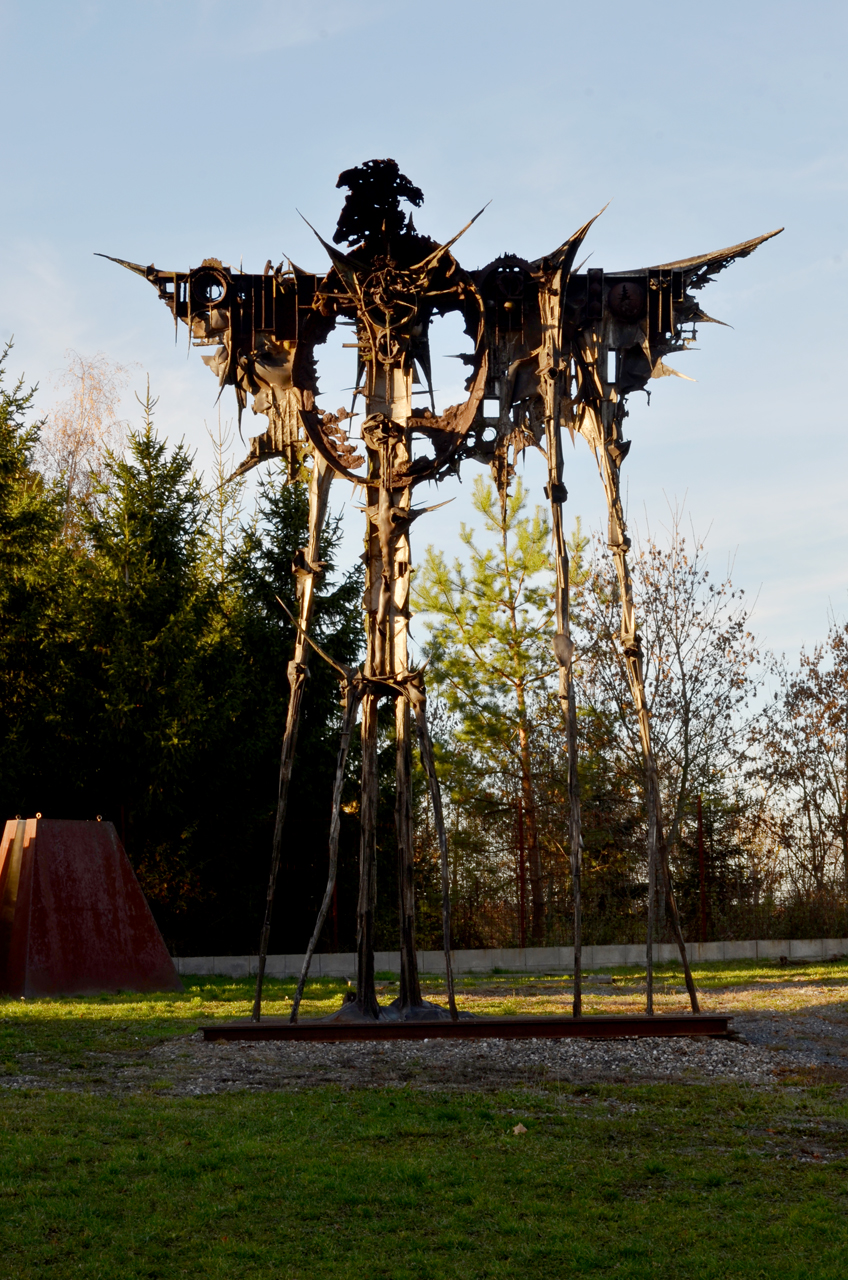
Aleš Veselý, Kaddish (1967-1969)

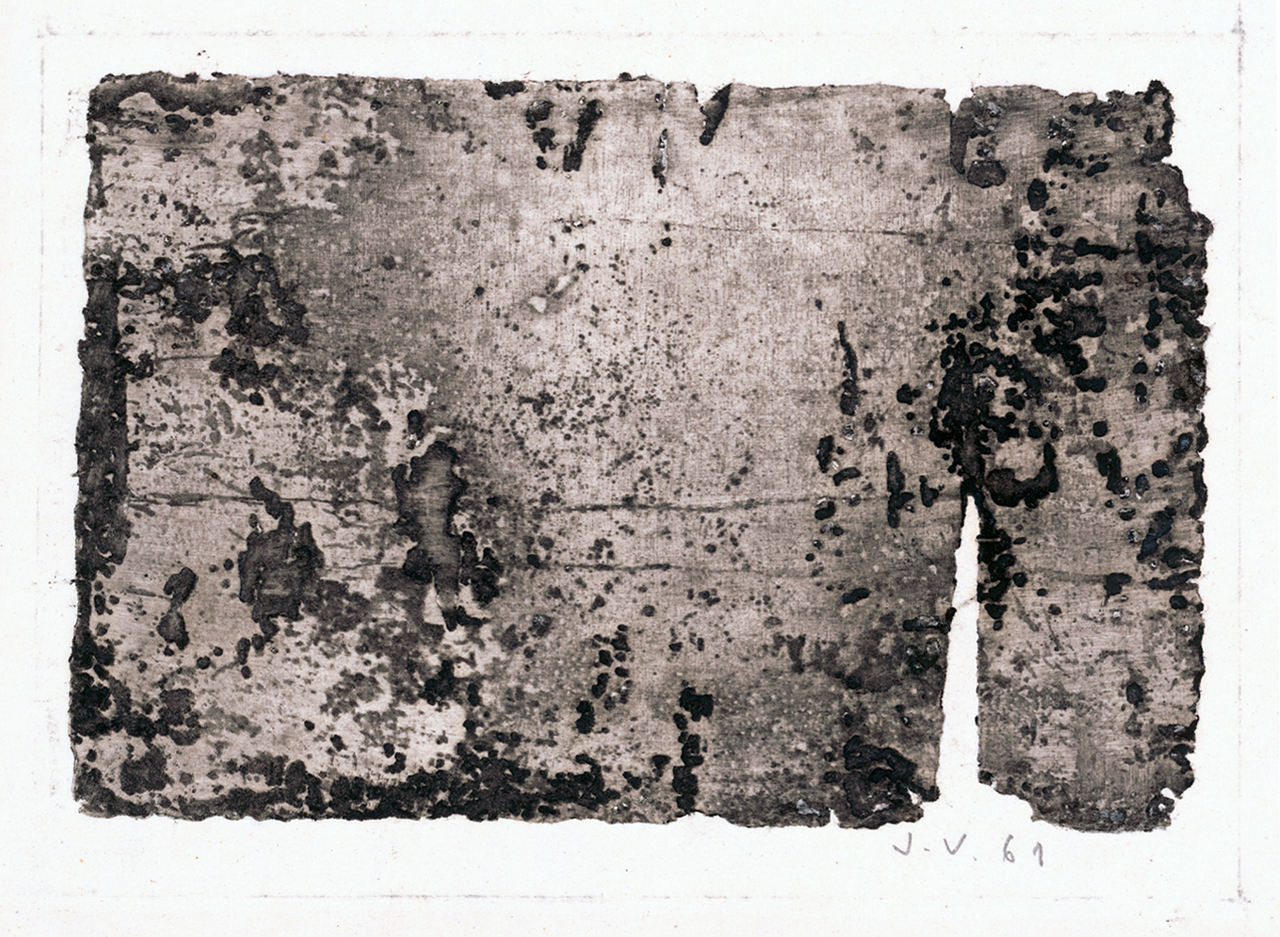
Jiří Valenta, Structural Print II (1961), GASK Kutná Hora

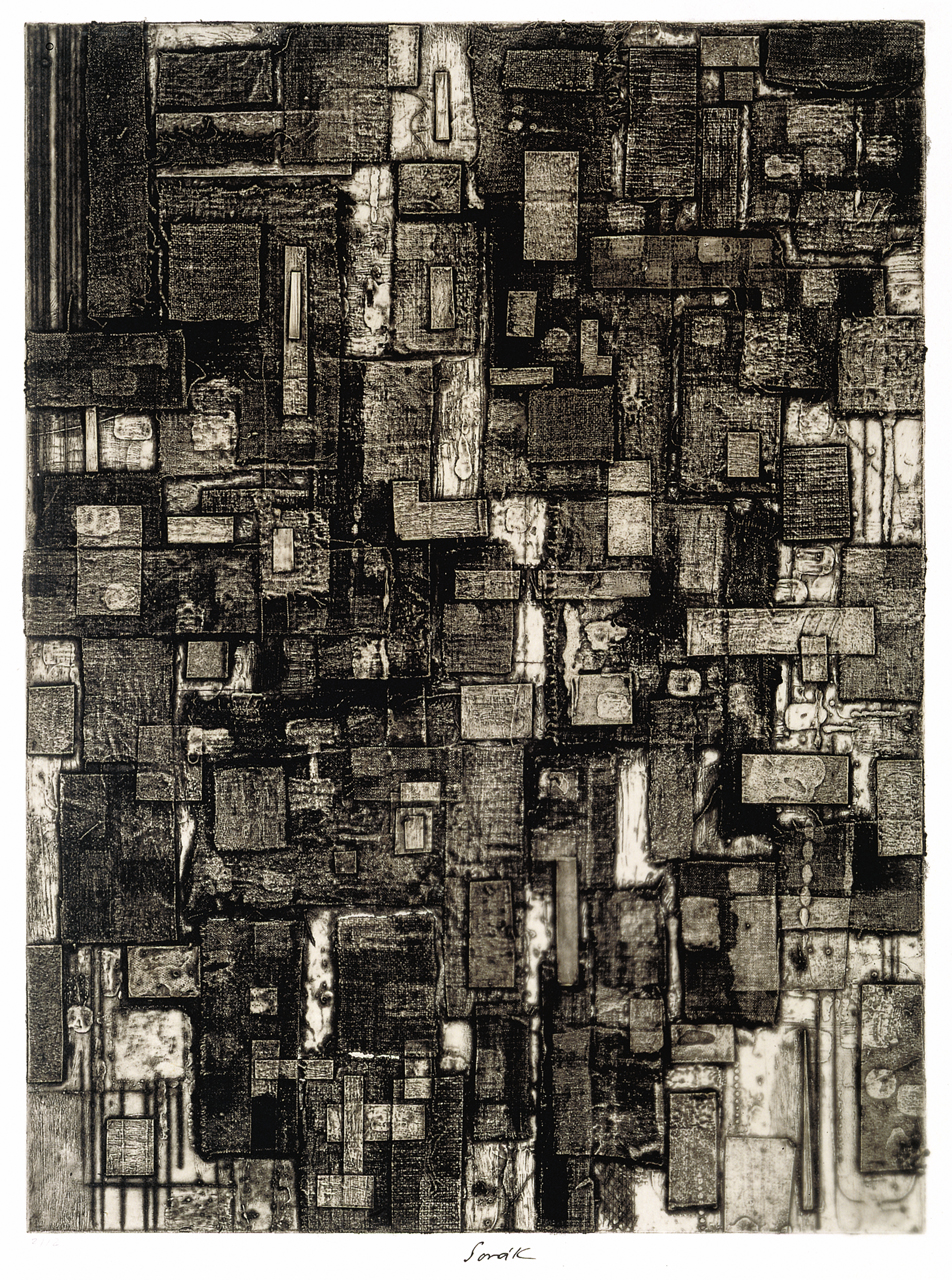
Pravoslav Sovák, Hommage à Franz Kafka, 1961

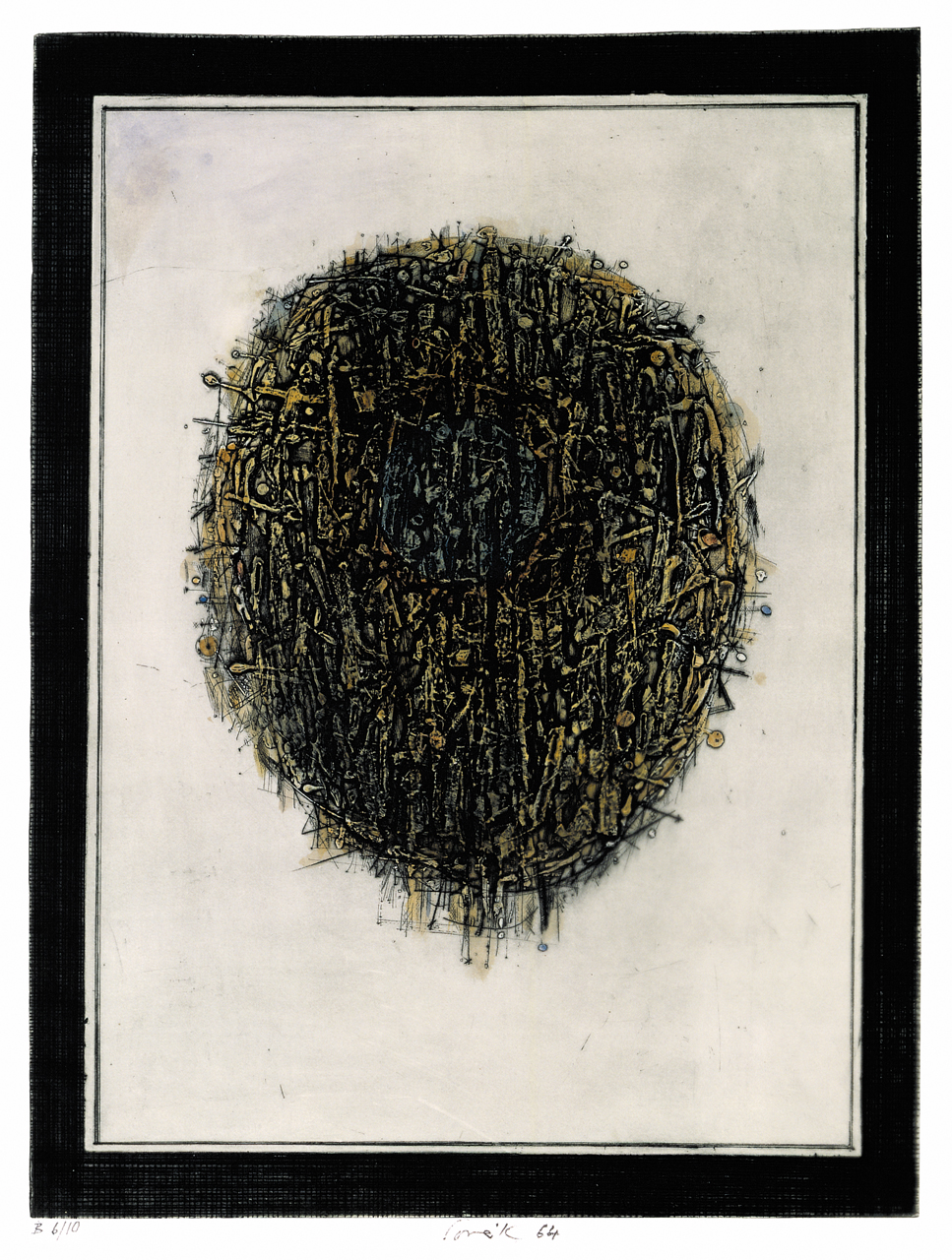
Pravoslav Sovák, Portrait in the Mirror I (1964), combined technique

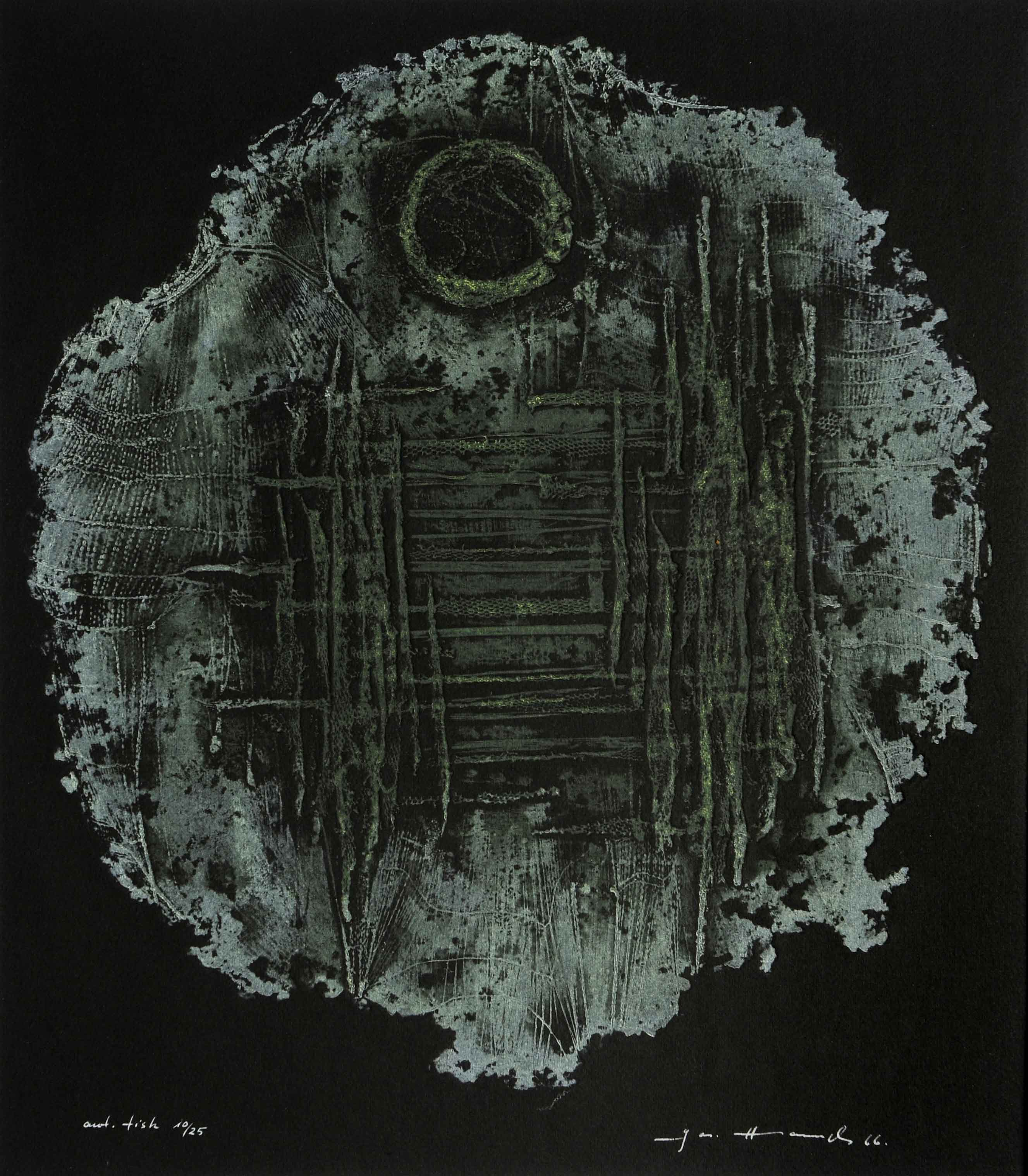
Josef Hampl, Untitled, 1966

== Sources ==
- František Dryje, Bertrand Schmitt (eds.), Jan Švankmajer, Ivo Purš, Dimensions of Dialogue—Between Film and Fine Art, 508 s., Arbor Vitae, Řevnice 2012, ISBN 9788074670169
- Peter Spielmann (ed.), Informel a skupina Cobra ze sbírek Bochumského muzea / Informel and the Cobra group from the collections of the Bochum Museum, DU of Brno, SGVU Cheb 1998, ISBN 80-7009-096-0
- Mahulena Nešlehová (ed.), Poselství jiného výrazu: Pojetí informelu v českém umění 50. a první poloviny 60. let, / The Message of Another Expression: The Concept of Informel in Czech Art of the 1950s and First Half of the 1960s, BASE Publishing House, Artefact, Prague 1997, ISBN 80-902481-0-1 (BASE), ISBN 80-902160-0-5 (ArteFACT)
- Marie Judlová (ed.), Ohniska znovuzrození: České umění 1956–1963 / Focal Points of Rebirth: Czech Art 1956–1963, Prague City Gallery, Institute of the Academy of Sciences of the Czech Republic, 1994, ISBN 9788070100295
- Mahulena Nešlehová (ed.), Český informel, Průkopníci abstrakce z let 1957–1964 / Czech Informel, Pioneers of Abstraction 1957–1964, 268 p., Gallery of the Capital City of Prague, SGVU Litoměřice, 1991
- Informel. Sborník sympozia / Informel. Proceedings of the Symposium, Academy of Fine Arts, Prague 1991
- František Šmejkal, Konfrontace 1960, Tvář č. 2, 1964, pp. 26–27
- Dore Ashton, The Unknown Shore: A View of Contemporary Art, 265 pp, Little, Brown, Boston 1962

=== Thesis ===
- Karolína Jiráská, Mimovýtvarné vlivy na český informel: estetika a případ Jiří Valenta / Extra-artistic influences on Czech informel: aesthetics and the case of Jiří Valenta, Master's thesis, FF MUNI Brno 2021
