= Civic Conservative Party (Czech Republic) =

Civic Conservative Party Občanská konzervativní strana
- Founder: Jiří Janeček
- Founded: February 2013 (as a faction of ODS); November 2017 (as a party)
- Dissolved: 2023
- Split from: Civic Democratic Party
- Ideology: National conservatism Klausism; Anti-immigration
- Political position: Right-wing
- European affiliation: Movement for a Europe of Nations and Freedom (2014–2016)
- Colours: Indigo

Website
- https://www.facebook.com/OKstrana1/

Civic Conservative Party (Czech: Občanská konzervativní strana, OKS or O.K. strana) was a national conservative political party in the Czech Republic, founded in 2013 by Jiří Janeček as a split from the Civic Democratic Party.

== History ==
In February 2013, Jiří Janeček founded the so-called Right faction within the Civic Democratic Party (ODS), with more than 300 members of the party. Janeček stated that the faction aimed to help the party solve its problems. Janeček's actions were criticised by many prominent members of ODS. Janeček resigned as Chairman of the Prague 11 organisation of ODS.

In November 2017, Janeček announced that the faction would leave ODS and become the Civic Conservative Party, arguing that ODS had left behind the ideas it was founded upon. OKS had 2,000 supporters within ODS.

OKS participated in the 2014 european election. It launched its campaign on 15 April 2014, led by Pavel Černý. The party failed to win any seats, receiving 0.22% of votes.

In 2014, OKS became one of the founding members of the Movement for a Europe of Nations and Freedom. Other members included the French National Front and the Freedom Party of Austria.

Some media reported in 2016 that OKS would merge with the Patriots of the Czech Republic, but the merger never took place. From 2020 the party had no leader.

In January 2022 the Ministry of Internal Affairs proposed the suspension of the party's activities as it was not fulfilling its legal obligations. The party's activities were suspended on 23 March 2022. The party was dissolved in December 2023.

== Ideology ==
The party's program emphasized "the creation of a stable economic environment, a balanced budget, and low taxes, as well as a significant reduction in immigration and in particular Islamization." The party was staunchly anti-communist, with former members of the Communist Party of Bohemia and Moravia barred from joining.

== Leaders ==
- Jiří Janeček (2013–2015)
- Barbora Štěpánková (2016–2020)
