= Jiří Balcar =

Jiří Balcar (26 August 1929 – 28 August 1968) was a Czechoslovak graphic artist, painter, illustrator, typographer and cartoonist. He was famous for designing movie posters and book covers.

== Life ==
Jiří Balcar was born in the family of doctor Emilian Balcar in Kolín. He was one of two sons for whom their father had great expectations, and the family situation was very tense. In 1945 his father committed suicide, which hit the young Balcar hard.

He studied at the Academy of Arts, Architecture and Design in Prague, which was cancelled and Balcar had to move to the studio of František Muzika. He finished his studies in 1953 and at the end of his short life, he often travelled abroad, especially to the United States of America. He died in a car accident in Prague in 1968.

== Work ==
Balcar's work began during high school when he worked with a dry needle technique. In the early 1950s, he began to incorporate typography into his works, which later became his typical style. The end of his work came after visits to foreign exhibitions, especially the World Exhibition in Brussels in 1958. He then turned to European trends and became one of the pioneers of the new wave of Czech abstract painting in the late 1950s. At the beginning of the 1960s, he created abstract paintings, graphics and drawings with typographic and handwritten signs as symbols of the unpredictability of everyday reality. The theme of a modern person participating in social life is an essential part of his work. In the following years Balcar reduces further to monochrome, dark images with pasty applied colour. In his prints, he reflected the impulses of American Pop Art and the new European figurations.

His work is represented in the collections of the Aleš South Bohemian Gallery in Hluboká nad Vltavou, the Czech Museum of Fine Arts, GhmP and NG in Prague, the Regional Gallery in Liberec and also abroad at the Jacques Baruch Gallery in Chicago, Illinois or the Sztuki Museum. Łódzi.
