= Jiří Janeček =

Czech politician (born 1973)

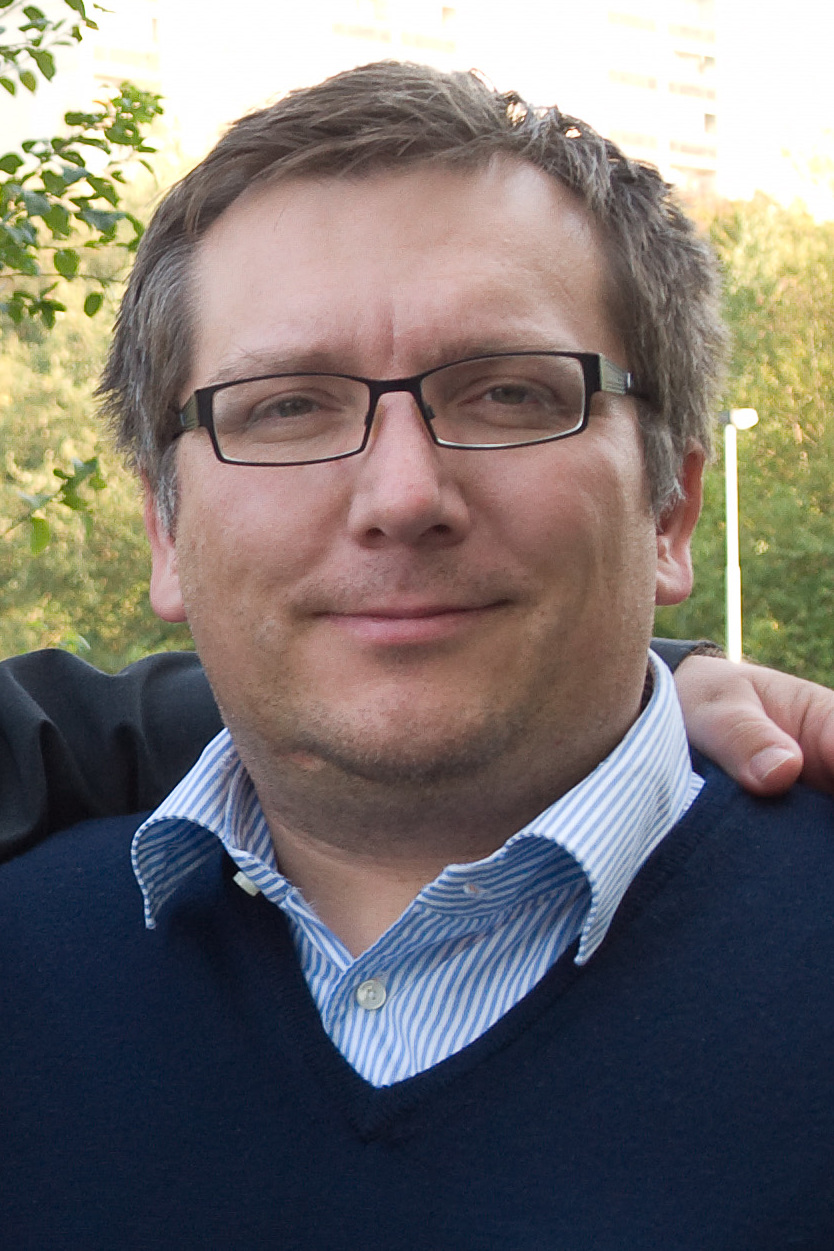
- Jiří Janeček at a pre-election meeting in September 2010

1st President of the Civic Conservative Party(OK)
- In office 2014–2016
- Preceded by: Created office
- Succeeded by: Barbora Štěpánková

Member of the Chamber of Deputies of the Parliament of the Czech Republic
- In office 25 October 2008 – 3 June 2010
- Constituency: Capital of Prague

Representative of the Capital of Prague
- In office 21 October 2006 – 21 October 2010

District Representative of the City of Prague 11
- In office 21 October 2006 – 16 October 2014

Personal details
- Born: December 29, 1973 (age 52) Prague, Czechoslovakia
- Party: Civic Conservative Party (OKS)
- Other political affiliations: Civic Democratic Party (ODS) (2002–2013); Young Social Democrats (before 2002)
- Children: 4
- Website: http://www.jirijanecek.cz/

Jiří Janeček (born December 29, 1973) is a Czech politician and entrepreneur. He was the founder and leader of the Civic Conservative Party (OKS). He was also a member of the Chamber of Deputies of the parliament of the Czech Republic in the capital Prague from 2008 to 2010. He is also the leader and founder of the Chcípl PES movement. Known for being against measures against the COVID-19 pandemic.

== Business career ==
Before politics, he was a businessman, he was once managing director and partner of the company J+J spol. s ro (1993–2003) and in the company EUROGURMAN (2001–2005).

He went into debt in 2019 on his daughters' apartments, then stopped. He also claimed that measures against the COVID-19 pandemic have destroyed his successful business. He currently owns the Malý Janek brewery.

== Political career ==
Before he was a member of the Young Social Democrats, then he went to the Civic Democratic Party (ODS) between, being president of ODS Prague 11 in 2004, claiming to never be afraid of “the cries of the left” and to present “non-populist solutions and proposals”. He was also vice president of the ODS in Prague in 2005. He was a councilor of the Prague City Council between 2006 and 2010, being elected in both municipal elections. He became a member of the Chamber of Deputies of the Czech Republic's parliament in 2008, after the resignation of Tomáš Kladívko, in which he was involved in the defense and security committees, and in the subcommittees of municipal police and intelligence. In 2010, he ran in the elections for the capital of Prague, coming in 5th place, in which he stated that "...If he fails in Prague, he will suffer a great defeat at the national level...".

In 2012, the Czech court ruled that it was illegal for Janeček to be collecting 2 million crowns (approximately $90,722.00) from businesswoman Eva Krejčí, at the time he was a councilor in Prague's city council. He had loaned in 2009 to Krejčí in cash, which is prohibited by the money laundering law, also having to ask deputy Miroslav Svoboda for a loan as he was saddled with a mortgage but had not made a declaration of ownership. At first, the municipal court rejected the payment, but later the higher court ordered Eva Krejčí to pay the debt. After being asked why he borrowed the money, he replied: "I have a son with a serious heart defect at home and my sister's son is blind. I donated my entire parliamentary salary to charity at the time, I did what I thought was right. As you can see, I will think more next time."

=== Withdrawal from ODS and founding of the Civic Conservative Party ===
Before leaving the ODS, he had founded the right-wing faction in the party in February 2013, prompting criticism from ODS members. He also resigned as president of ODS Prague 11. In the same year, he leaves the ODS, stating that he had lost his right-wing ideals, taking left-wing values. In late 2013, he founded the Civic Conservative Party (OKS), based on the right faction, he became president of the party in February 2014.

In the OKS party, he ran in the 2014 Prague City Council elections, Prague Mayor and Prague City Council 11, in both of which he was not elected.

In October of the same year, the police charged him and 39 other former deputies were charged with abuse of power and selling municipal property between 2010 and 2011, in which he claims he feels he is innocent.

In December 2015, he ceased to be president of OKS, in which in March 2016, Barbora Štěpánková becomes president of the party.

==== COVID-19 pandemic ====
During the COVID-19 pandemic, he showed himself to be against containment measures, in which he stated that "the government failed with its restrictions and started a much more lethal pandemic of poverty, unemployment, companies collapsing." In 2020, he founded Chcípl PES, a movement against the restrictions of the pandemic, especially against the restrictions on the operation of restaurants. In 2021, he organized a protest against the measures, in which protesters built a chain of beer glasses and also held Czech flags, some protesters were anti-vaccine. He stated about the protests that "The chaotic measures taken by this government do not work and will never work".

==== Foreign policy ====
Janeček supports the Russian invasion of Ukraine. In a since-deleted Facebook post from the Chcípl PES page, he criticised Czech Prime Minister Petr Fiala, calling him a "useful idiot" of the United States for helping Ukraine. He wrote that "Putin is not crazy, but if there is genocide in the breakaway republics (Donetsk and Luhansk People's Republics), he will have no choice but to intervene. Sending bullets at construction sites is an act of war that knows no analogues."

== Personal life ==
In 2010, he participated in the Dakar Rally, finishing 41st overall in a Toyota Land Cruiser KDJ120.
