= Vladimír Boudník =

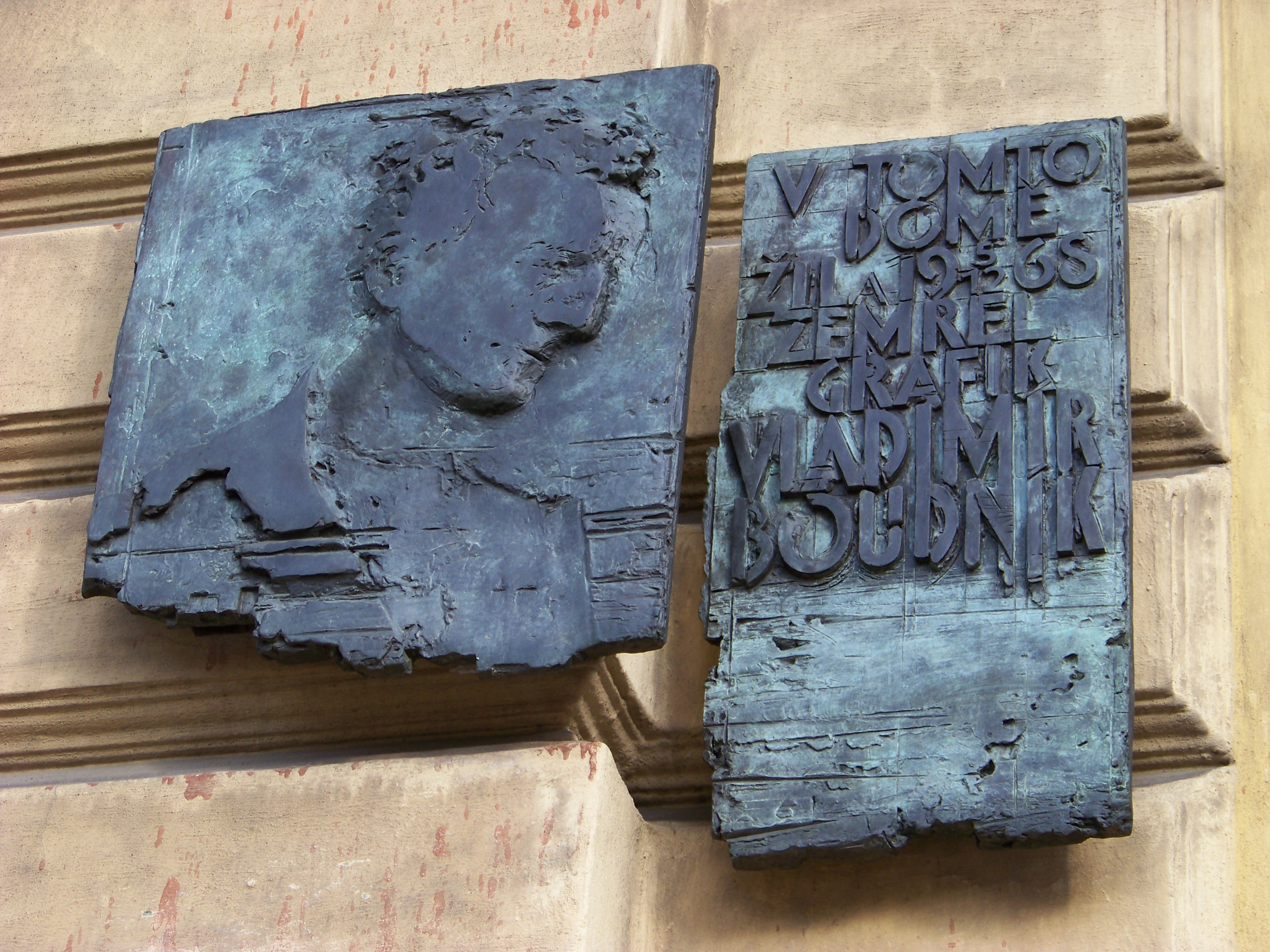
Memorial plaque to Vladimír Boudník on the house where he lived and died in Prague-Žižkov

Vladimír Boudník (17 March 1924 – 5 December 1968) was a Czech graphic artist and photographer. He was a key figure in Czech post-war art and a representative of the "explosionism" movement. He is best known for his active and structural graphic art, but also created mostly photographic and monotype works that, until recently, remained unknown.

== Biography ==
Boudník was born on 17 March 1924 in Prague.

During World War II, he was sent to forced labor in Germany, an experience that resulted in a lifelong trauma. After the war, he attended art school, where he studied printmaking. He spent a brief period working in advertising before getting a job at an ironworks in Kladno, where he met Bohumil Hrabal.

In 1952 Boudník, began working for ČKD Works in Prague. The factory environment served as an inspiration for his "active graphics" made of industrial material and waste.

Boudník died on 5 December 1968 in Prague. He committed suicide while experimenting with asphyxiation.

== Work ==
Boudník worked mostly in graphics, and developed a number of innovative printmaking techniques. He was also one of the first Czech artists to begin working with the general public, organizing "happenings" and interacting with psychiatric patients.

His work had a large influence on many contemporary Czech artists, especially author Bohumil Hrabal, with whom he shared many years of friendship. Boudník appears in several texts by Hrabal, most notably the novella The Gentle Barbarian.

Since 1995, the city of Prague has annually awarded the Vladimír Boudník Award (Cena Vladimíra Boudníka) to a living Czech printmaking artist. Notable recipients include Jan Kubíček.

At least five volumes of collected works and correspondence of Vladimír Boudník have been published since the 1990s.

== Literature ==
- Něžný Barbar (The Gentle Barbarian), Bohumil Hrabal, Prague: Petlice 1973 (underground publishing house); Exile edition: Index, Köln, 1981. The novel features Boudník.
- Zdeněk Primus (ed.), Vít Havránek, Vladislav Merhaut, Martin Pilař, Jan Rous, Jiří Valoch: Vladimír Boudník mezi avantgardou a undergroudem [ Vladimír Boudník between the avant-garde and underground ], 2004, ISBN 80-86010-77-5. Monograph tracing Boudník's life and works.
