= Václav Tikal =

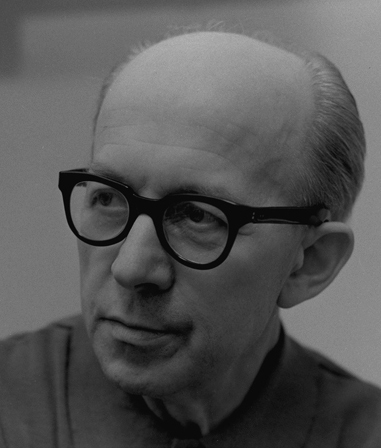
portrait of Václav Tikal by Karel Kuklík, 1960s

Václav Tikal (24 December 1906 in Ptetin village, Plzeň Region – 26 November 1965 in Prague) was a Czechoslovak surrealist painter and ceramist.
