= Karel Nepraš =

Czech sculptor, draughtsman, graphic artist and professor (1932-2002)

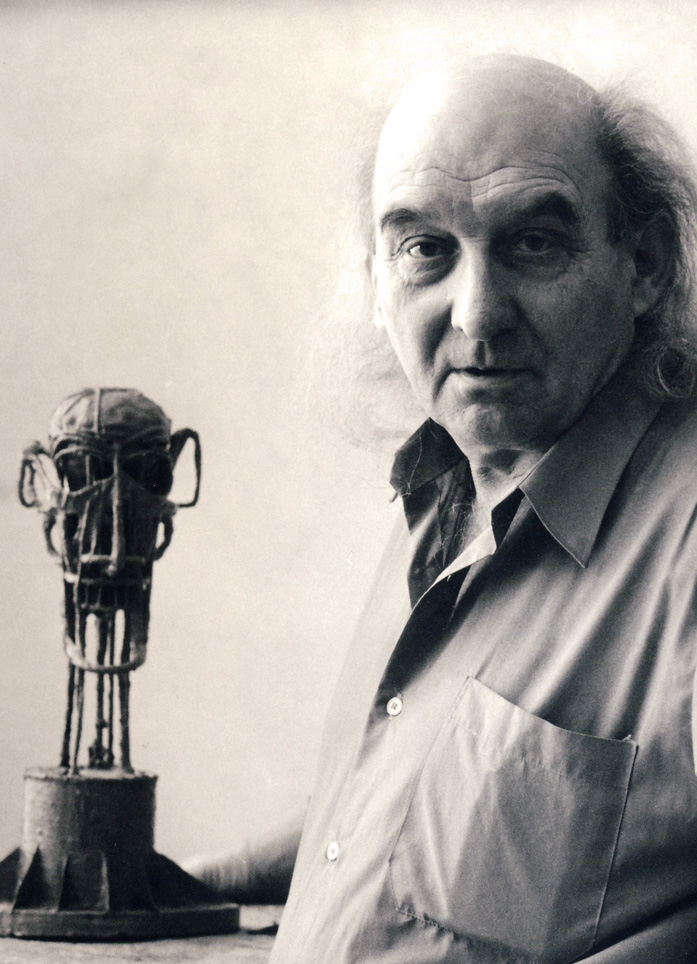
- Karel Nepraš in studio
- Born: 2 April 1932; Prague, Czechoslovakia
- Died: 5 April 2002 (aged 70); Prague, Czech Republic
- Education: Academy of Fine Arts Prague
- Occupations: sculptor, draughtsman, printmaker, professor at Academy of Fine Arts
- Notable work: Family ready to leave (1969)
- Movement: Šmidra group, Crusader school
- Spouse: Naděžda Plíšková
- Awards: Medal of Merit, 1st Grade (2002, in memoriam)

Karel Nepraš (2 April 1932 – 5 April 2002) was a Czech sculptor, draughtsman, graphic artist and professor at Prague Academy. Already in the 1960s, Nepraš became one of the most prominent Czech artists thanks to his ability to master new materials, techniques and technologies and creatively exploit them. His original work has also been recognized abroad. Through playfulness, subversive irony and bitter humour, he has kept himself free from pathos, pretension and any ideological cliché. Nepraš's work is often classified as part of the so-called Czech Grotesque, (Note: For example, Josef Kroutvor wrote: "The grotesque is an inner contradiction, a double consciousness, the reverse and the face of life. The outer manifestation does not correspond to the inner experience". Josef Kroutvor, Manifesto of the Czech Grotesque, in: Kroutvor J, Fernety, Torst, Prague 1998, pp. 301–305) which partly overlapped with New Figuration, but the term was rather a substitute for such notions as alienation, absurdity and manipulation, which were unacceptable to the then communist regime. With the rapid deterioration of state cultural policy under normalization, the grotesque acted as a distinctly intellectual commentary on reality. According to art historian Jan Kříž, there are only a few sculptors in the world who could so perfectly connect the tragicomedy of human existence with the tragicomedy of general history.

The period of normalization he experienced in difficult existential conditions, without the possibility to exhibit and in seclusion. He received recognition again only after the fall of the communist regime, when he was appointed professor at the Academy of Fine Arts in Prague. A number of prominent personalities emerged from the Karel Nepraš School Socha 1, such as the sculptors Paulina Skavova, Martina Hozová, Klára Klose and Markéta Korečková, the sculptors Karel Bartáček, Zdeněk Šmíd, Vít Novotný, Ján Macko and the painter MICL. In addition to teaching students, Nepraš devoted himself intensively to his own work and is considered one of the most original representatives of New Figuration.

== Life ==
Karel Nepraš was born on 2 April 1932 in Prague into the family of a bank clerk. Thanks to his art teacher at the town school, who encouraged his interest in drawing and advised him, he saw several exhibitions before the 1948 Czechoslovak coup d'état. In 1948–1951, he graduated from the Secondary Industrial Ceramic School in Prague, where Bedřich Dlouhý also studied. In 1952 he was admitted to the Academy of Fine Arts in the sculpture studio of Prof. Jan Lauda, and in 1958 he graduated as an academic sculptor.

Before the war, Jan Lauda was a leading representative of so-called social art and had excellent training (pupil of Jan Štursa, shared studio with Otto Gutfreund). He was a member of the Communist Party of Czechoslovakia, and in 1951 he was awarded the State Prize of Klement Gottwald for his bust of V. I. Lenin. Karel Nepraš was a prominent student of Lauda, and his professor actively protected him, giving him repeatedly excellent marks in sculpture. He also saved him from being expelled from Academy when Nepraš repeatedly failed exams in Marxism-Leninism and Lauda convinced the examining comrade to give him at least a C. At the end of his studies he defended Nepraš's diploma thesis - an unconventional monument to the pioneer of aeronautics E. Čihák. From the practice of the ceramicist and the principles of the Lauda school on the necessity to maintain the solid construction of the sculpture, Nepraš took away the inclination towards a convex shape, which "is the vault that holds the space"

=== Šmidra group ===
In the oppressive atmosphere of the communist regime of the 1950s, the general spying and the emphasis on teaching Marxism–Leninism and socialist realism at the Academy, personal friendships and private gatherings of students were more important than school. Nepraš and his friends were aware that they stood completely outside official art, and prank was a necessary common self-defence.

Together with his classmates Jan Koblasa, Bedřich Dlouhý and musicians Rudolf Komorous, Libor Pešek and Jan Klusák, he founded the Club (in the manner of English gentlemen's clubs), which prepared a joint Dadaist event of artists, actors and musicians Malmuzherciáda (abbreviated in English would be: PaintActMus-ade) in the Club of Unitarians (Dec. 19, 1954). Nepraš exhibited the painting Green Mother Destroying Her Child. The painter Ladislav Placatka and the composer Jan Bedřich also took part and a joint composition Eine kleine Dadamusik (with the phrases Duchaminulost, Duchapřítomnost, Duchabudoucnost) was performed. After this event some left the "Club" and the remaining members - Karel Nepraš, Jan Koblasa, Bedřich Dlouhý and Rudolf Komorous continued to meet as Šmidra group (Note: "Šmidra" is a slightly derisive term for a policeman from a puppet play; in the case of the Šmidra group, it is a form of self-stylization of artists who felt marginalized under the communist regime) (Jaroslav Vožniak joined in 1955). In 1955, Nepraš participated as a designer in the performance Two Ballets at Ledebur Gardens (Malá Strana), for which the libretto wrote Jan Koblasa.

In 1957 they prepared a one-day exhibition on Střelecký ostrov together with invited literary artists (Václav Havel, Jiří Paukert, Milena Tobolová) and professional musicians (Modern Jazz Quintet of Eugen Jegorov, Rudolf Dašek, Milan Kostohryz, etc. ) as a composed evening, with the presentation of private artworks.

The activities of the Šmidra group, in addition to regular meetings, recessional events and formalised rituals with fragmentary collaborative literary activities, continued after they finished studies at the Prague Academy. Nepraš brought a performative playful talent to the club and cultivated the scope of drawing. In 1958, the club, inspired by spontaneous idea of Bedřich Dlouhý formed "Šmidra brass band". None of the participants had a musical background (except Koblasa, who won a singing competition). Nepraš played the flugelhorn and was privately taught for about three months by a trumpet player from the conservatory. Later he played the violin. Their joint performance was also a distinctive 1959 production of Arsonist's daughter by Josef Kajetán Tyl and a parody of the official rituals of the time - The Ceremonial Academy of the Šmidra group in memory of the poet Václav Svoboda Plumlovský at the Reduta Jazz Club in 1960 (with the participation of Hana Purkrábková, Aleš Veselý, Kateřina Černá, Čestmír Janošek, Jan Klusák, Petr Lampl, Bohumír Mráz). In the same year, the amateur film Šmidra's Magician's Lantern was made.

Out of the unrestrained fun arose a completely serious, but still absurdly tuned work, inspired by Kafka and Klíma and influenced by the contemporary inclination towards existentialism. The ten-year history of the "Šmidra group" was commemorated by an exhibition in Ostrov nad Ohří in 1965, prepared by the theoretician of the group Jan Kříž, the author of the general term "strangeness" for their works. In 1968, the first Prague exhibition of the "Šmidra group" took place in Václav Špála Gallery, later reprised in Gallery of Modern Art in Hradec Králové.

As the political atmosphere relaxed and the need to devote themselves to their own work, activity of "Šmidra group" gradually diminished. "Šmidra group" briefly reunited in 1962 with the founding of the Paleta vlasti (Palette of the Fatherland) hockey club. In addition to Koblasa, Nepraš and Dlouhý, the founding members were Hugo Demartini, Theodor Pištěk, Josef Klimeš, Karel Kouba, Milan Stibůrek (the only hockey player, member of the Sparta B-team), Bohumil Němeček, Radek Venclík and Jan Vachuda. In the 1960s the Palette of the Fatherland club was active, among others, in the Baráčnická rychta. The Palette of the Fatherland amateur activities, dance parties and cabarets were at least as popular throughout the 1960s as the chats of Sklep Theatre in the 1970s. In 1992, a delegation of the club presented the Palette of the Fatherland Award to Václav Havel.

The reconstruction of the activities of the Šmidra group was made possible by Jan Koblasa, who published his diary entries and sent a questionnaire to living members in 2004–2005.

=== Crusader School ===
As an author of drawings for magazines, Nepraš met the artist Jan Steklík and in 1963, in the company of those meeting in the pub U Křižovníků (At Crusaders), they founded the Crusader School of pure humour without jokes, where he and Steklík took turns as directors. In addition to artists (Naděžda Plíšková, Zbyšek Sion, Otakar Slavík, Zdeněk Beran, Rudolf Němec, Aleš Lamr, Olaf Hanel, Antonín Tomalík, etc. ) and photographers (Jiří Putta, Helena Wilsonová, Jan Ságl, Jaroslav Kořán, art historian Jan Kříž, Eugen Brikcius, Vladimír Borecký, Věra Jirousová, Josef Kroutvor, Karel Oujezdský, Paul Wilson, Andrej Stankovič, Petr Lampl, etc.), young poets from the circle of the magazine Workbooks for Young Literature (Petr Kabeš, Ivan Wernisch, Pavel Šrut) and members of the then cultural underground (Ivan Martin Jirous, Vratislav Brabenec, Jiří Němec, Dana Němcová, and others). The free association of the Crusader School was a completely unique creative phenomenon, which, as a distinctive parallel to the Fluxus movement, connected everyday reality with art, with the ambition to enter the social or natural environment. It promoted the so-called aesthetics of "weirdness" and gave rise to the Czech visual grotesque. Slavíková places the Crusader School among the neo-avant-garde movements of the 1960s and 1970s, which sought to cross the boundaries between life and art through play.

The Crusader School, which moved from the closed pub U Křižovníků to the U Svitáků pub in 1968, to the Zlatý soudek in Ostrovní in 1970, and then back to U Svitáků, revived its activity after the occupation in 1968 at the beginning of normalization. Musical activities of the Midsummer Night's Dream Band (founder Karel Nepraš (violin), Miloslav Hájek, Milan Čech, Petr Lampl, Vratislav Brabenec) and The Plastic People of the Universe, happenings, trips from Prague to the sources of the Vltava River or climbing Říp, wake-up calls to Blaník knights, "collecting beer samples", ephemeral joint projects (staging The Bartered Bride in the U Svitáků pub) were part of collective mental regeneration, but were not directly related to the artistic activities of the members. According to Olaf Hanel, the main activity was "the shift of nonsense into everyday rituals in an atmosphere of pub romance." A practical philosophy of life as self-defence against the adversities of the world was born here. There were unwritten but observed laws, such as not talking about one's job, family, love affairs, employment or financial situation. The Crusader school did not cultivate stylistic purity. It willingly opened itself to all possibilities, it was not indifferent to new art forms, ideas and directions, the new always inspired it. It transformed the impulses to its image - it could turn a serious thought or idea into a farce, ordinary things and encounters became surprising artefacts and events. It had her own aphorisms, probably the most famous of which was: A small shot of rum is the big shot of rum of the poor.

In 1991, when the retrospective exhibition of the Crusader School was held at the Gallery of Modern Art in Hradec Králové, there were over 40 full members and a wider circle of over 60 others. Strict criteria were applied for the admission of new members - in particular, to demonstrate the ability to be creatively oneself and to be able to respect the never established rules of the game, which could only be derived from a specific situation. In 1999, Ben Patterson (a founding figure of the Fluxus movement) and the German painter Annegret Heinl were accepted as new members.

=== 1960s ===
In 1960 and then in 1962 and 1963 Nepraš exhibited his drawings for the first time (Rokoko Theatre, Paravan Theatre, Regional Gallery in Liberec). In 1964 he participated in the Exhibition D in Nová síň Gallery in Prague and the exhibition Sculpture 1964 in Liberec, he had a solo exhibition at Gallery on Charles Square, which was run by Ludmila Vachtová, he began to publish his drawings in the magazines Host do domu, Trn or Plamen. In the 1960s, he exhibited together with the Polylegran cartoonists' association. Before the beginning of normalization, he lost the possibility to publish cartoon humour in Dikobraz magazine and other periodicals, and in the following years he devoted himself to free drawing and graphic art.

In 1964, Karel Nepraš married the artist and poet Naděžda Plíšková. In 1975 they had a daughter, Karolína, later married Kračková, who is also an artist.

From the mid-1960s onwards, Karel Nepraš gradually established himself as a draughtsman and sculptor, participating in important exhibitions at home and abroad, and his work was of interest to galleries and art collectors. In 1965 he exhibited at the La Biennale internationale des jeunes artistes in Paris and at the Jeune avant-garde tchécoslovaque exhibition at the Lambert Gallery in Paris, and in 1967 at the Exhibition of Contemporary Czechoslovak Art in Turin. He received several awards for his sculptures (Stockholm, Písek, at the exhibition Fantasy Aspects at the Václav Špála Gallery, Jihlava). His exhibition at the Lambert Gallery was favourably reviewed by the eminent art critic Gérard Gassiot-Talabot.

In 1968, Nepraš and Naděžda Plíšková attended a symposium in Stuttgart and spent six months there. During this stay Nepraš, among other things, learned the technique of working with cast iron. In February 1969 they had a joint exhibition at the Studium Generale in Stuttgart. In 1969 they decided to return to Czechoslovakia occupied by Warsaw Pact troops. In 1969, Nepraš was represented at the New Figuration exhibition at the Mánes (curated by Eva Petrová, Luděk Novák), reprised in 1970 at the Brno Kunsthalle (Brno House of Art).

He took part in the Artchemo symposium, focused on the use of plastics in the visual arts, in Pardubice (1968/1969) and the second International Symposium of Spatial Forms in Ostrava (1969), where he worked with cast iron and chain transmissions. He created one of his top works - a large composed sculpture Family Ready to Leave. At the beginning of normalization it was taken from the park in the centre of Ostrava to a landfill and destroyed during the 1980s. Nepraš met an experienced modeller in Prague and taught himself the whole process up to the casting of the sculpture, acquired his own grinding machine and was freiendly with the former owner of the foundry in Stará huť, where all his later cast-iron sculptures were cast.

In 1969, Karel Nepraš was awarded a Ford Foundation scholarship, but the Communist authorities refused to allow him to leave the country.

=== 1970–1989 ===
After the occupation by soviet army in 1968, it took more than two years before the communist authorities gained full control over the art scene. In 1970 an anthology was published for the exhibition Šmidra group at Bítov Castle by Obelisk publishing house and although the book was to be sent to the pulp-mill, part of the print run was saved by a publishing house employee. This year Karel Nepraš had his last solo exhibition of sculptures at Václav Špála Gallery (curated by Jan Kříž) and a joint exhibition with Naděžda Plíšková in Havlíčkův Brod (curated by Karel Miler), and participated at the exhibition of the results of the Artchemo symposium in Pardubice.

In 1971 Nepraš participated in the 6. International Ceramics Symposium in Hradec Králové and returned to ceramics, which he had previously studied at secondary school. In 1972, he had a joint exhibition with Jan Steklík at the Brno House of Art, organized by Jiří Valoch.

In the early 1970s, the regime's repression of independent culture intensified. Many of Nepraš's friends were forced to emigrate, others found themselves in prison. A planned joint exhibition of Nepraš, Plíšková and Steklík in the regional gallery in Ústí nad Orlicí was banned in 1973. Nepraš lost the opportunity to present his works and was forced to make a living from restoration. He had a personal and creative crisis (Self-portrait - cemetery sculpture, 1973, Attempted suicide, 1976–1977, New Year's cards – e.g. for the year of Charter 77 with two gallows) and between 1974 and 1987 he almost resigned to both drawing and sculpture. He lacked the energy and motivation to complete his sculptures. The artistic activity on the borderline between creation and everyday life, as practiced by the members of the Crusader School, automatically found itself on the periphery or on the scrap-heap of culture. Nepraš's sculptures from that time continue the Dadaist, Duchampian orientation of modern art and create early forms of conceptual art on the Czech art scene, in which the objecthood and technique of the world we live in are asserted.

In the 1970s there were underground performances of the Midsummer Night's Dream Band, where Nepraš performed as a violinist. He participated in the unofficial First Festival of Second Culture in Postupice in 1974.

In 1978, a unique Nepraš exhibition was held at the Sonnenring Galerie, Münster, organized by Jan Kříž. Meda Mládková included Nepraš in the exhibition Eleven Contemporary Artists from Prague in New York (1980) and Ann Arbor (1981). In 1983 he was represented in the exhibition Czech Drawing of the 20th Century from the Collections of the Regional Gallery of Fine Arts in Olomouc, organized by Pavel Zatloukal. In 1984, thanks to František Šmejkal, his drawings were presented at the exhibition Dessins tchèques du 20e siècle (Czech Drawing of the 20th Century) at the Centre Georges Pompidou in Paris. In 1984, Vlastimil Tetiva organized an exhibition of Nepraš's drawings at the small House of Culture in České Budějovice.

New opportunities to exhibit appeared in the late 1980s. In the 1980s these were first unofficial exhibitions in improvised spaces (ÚMCH Gallery (Makráč), Gallery H, People's house in Vysočany, Opatov Gallery, Vojanovy sady, Forum 1988, Salon of Prague Artists '88, Litvínov Theatre, 1989) or exhibitions abroad (Museum Moderner Kunst, Vienna 1987/1988, Hirshhorn Museum and Sculpture Garden, Washington D.C., 1988, Herbert F. Johnson Museum of Art, Ithaca, 1988, Warsaw, 1988). Thanks to his friendship with Jiří Sopko, Nepraš took part in the Basel Art Fair in 1987. At the turn of 1987/1988 he was included in the exhibition Grotesqueness in Czech 20th Century Art, organized by the Prague City Gallery. The author of the exhibition A. Pomajzlová presented grotesqueness in art as a horror of life and a way out of the bleakness of the time. With the return of the possibility to present his works, Nepraš has regained new vitality to free creation.

=== 1990–2002 ===
Since 1990 Karel Nepraš served as associate professor, and from 1991 as professor and head of the Studio of Sculpture 1 (Karel Nepraš School) at the Academy of Fine Arts in Prague until April 2002. In the school year 1996–1997 the studio was moved to Doubice during the reconstruction of the academy building. The studio included compulsory visits to exhibitions of modern art, trips abroad (Greece, Venice Biennale, Dokumenta-Kassel, Paris, Berlin, Vienna), a summer sculpture plein-air workshop at Helfštýn, led by Marius Kotrba, and joint exhibitions of Nepraš's students.

Nepraš as a teacher valued openness and directness and hated posturing. He communicated rather extra-verbally and relied on the sculptural intelligence of his students, emphasising content, meaning and significance; the search for form was an afterthought. Part of the teaching methodology was the problem of shape and proportion and the solution of the relationship between content and form. He was a natural and generally respected authority for students and the AVU management and allowed students to consult with other teachers. No one usually transferred from his studio to another. The close and friendly relationship of the students to their professor is evidenced by the internal renaming of the studio to Karel Nepraš Lesbian School, an annual party for Nepraš's birthday, a spontaneously created Nepraš playmate calendar or an edible aspic torso created for his anniversary.

Nepraš used his own experience from studio of prof. Jan Lauda (who mediated Jan Štursa style) and introduced the practice of modelling according to a live model, which was available in the studio every day between 8-12 am. In the afternoons, the students could engage in their own free creation. Part of the free and relaxed atmosphere in Nepraš's studio was a focus on work and artistic creation as a natural way of life, without emphasis on performance. A number of prominent personalities emerged from Nepraš's studio - for example, the sculptors Paulina Skavova, Martina Hozová and Klára Klose or the sculptor Zdeněk Šmíd and the painter MICL.

In 1992, the Prague City Gallery organized a Gala Evening on the Occasion of Karel Nepraš's Life Anniversary. In 1994 he created the sculpture Dialogue VIII - Lightning Rod as part of the symposium Prostor Zlín. At the turn of 1993–1994, he took part in the renewed International Symposium of Spatial Forms in Ostrava (sculpture Yogi, 1994) and in 1998 at the Symposium of Iron Sculpture in Třinec Ironworks. During the International Ceramic Symposium "Light, Shadow and Porcelain" in Louny in 1996 he met the ceramist Ivan Jelínek, who shared his experience in working with electroporcelain. In 1994–1998 he collaborated on the reconstruction of Prague palaces with architect Pavel Kupka. He won the competition for the monument to Jaroslav Hašek in Žižkov (1995), but did not live to see its realisation and in 2005 the monument was completed by his daughter Karolína Kračková. In 2000 he was invited to take part in a competition for a monument to Franz Kafka.

Karel Nepraš was intensively devoted to his own work and had more than 30 solo exhibitions between 1991 and 2019. The largest retrospective exhibition of Karel Nepraš's works took place in 2012 at the DOX Centre for Contemporary Art in Prague. He has been represented in hundreds of group exhibitions at home and abroad (Germany, France, USA, Netherlands, Belgium, UK, Austria, Sweden, Norway, Finland, Poland, Spain, Indonesia).

Karel Nepraš died in Prague on 5 April 2002, three days after his 70th birthday. President Václav Havel awarded him the Medal of Merit in memoriam in 2002.

=== Awards (selection) ===
- 1962 Silver medal, International Exhibition of Modern Ceramics, Prague
- 2002 Medal of Merit, 1st Grade (in memoriam)

== Work ==
=== Drawings and prints ===
Nepraš's first humorous drawings were created in 1956 during compulsory lectures on Marxism–Leninism at the Academy, originally as a play and response to drawings by Bedřich Dlouhý, and later to cartoons by Saul Steinberg. Eventually, they abandoned the lyrical primitivizing poetics towards abstraction and evolved into a peculiar, often very harsh and black cartoon humour, with which he reacted to the political oppression of the time. Drawing was not a mere recession, but had a necessary defensive function. It was characterised by satire, parody, irony, sarcasm, persiflage and the grotesque. Nepraš's drawings appeared in magazines from the late 1950s onwards, for example in Plamen or Host do domu in the 1960s, and briefly in Dikobraz, and after 1989 in Přítomnost. In the 1960s his drawings were published in books (Totenklagen, Artia 1966, Puppenbusen (Satirische Zeichnungen), 1969). They were neither caricatures nor cartoon jokes, rather characterized by a bitter truthfulness and demands on the perceiver's intellect. The drawings were also source for his later sculptural work.

The drawings of human figures from the late 1950s reflect an absurd, dehumanised and alienated world where horror and terror as well as comedy and humour grow from the same base (Funeral of a Clown, 1957). Some were inspired by reading - illustrations for The Trial by Franz Kafka (1959) or the poems of Edgar Allan Poe ('Berenice, 1960), music (The Midnight Tone, 1959) or social atmosphere (Puppet Theatre, Labyrinths of the World, 1956–1961), and gradually evolved into a specific kind of black humour with existential overtones (Little Brutality, 1959). Nepraš himself states that "he recorded cruelty and brutality unconsciously and unintentionally with the aim to show what is not nice about reality, not wanting to moralize". Kafka's The Castle accurately captured the atmosphere of the 1950s and influenced Nepraš's feelings, thinking and philosophy of life for a long time.

In his correspondence, Rudolf Komorous began to use the term strangeness as an aesthetic principle, and the other members of the Šmidra group identified with him. The concept of strangeness manifested itself as a polymorphous assemblage technique in painting, sculpture and music, and the absurdities of the historical realities of Czechoslovak totalitarian regime gave it ever new impulses.

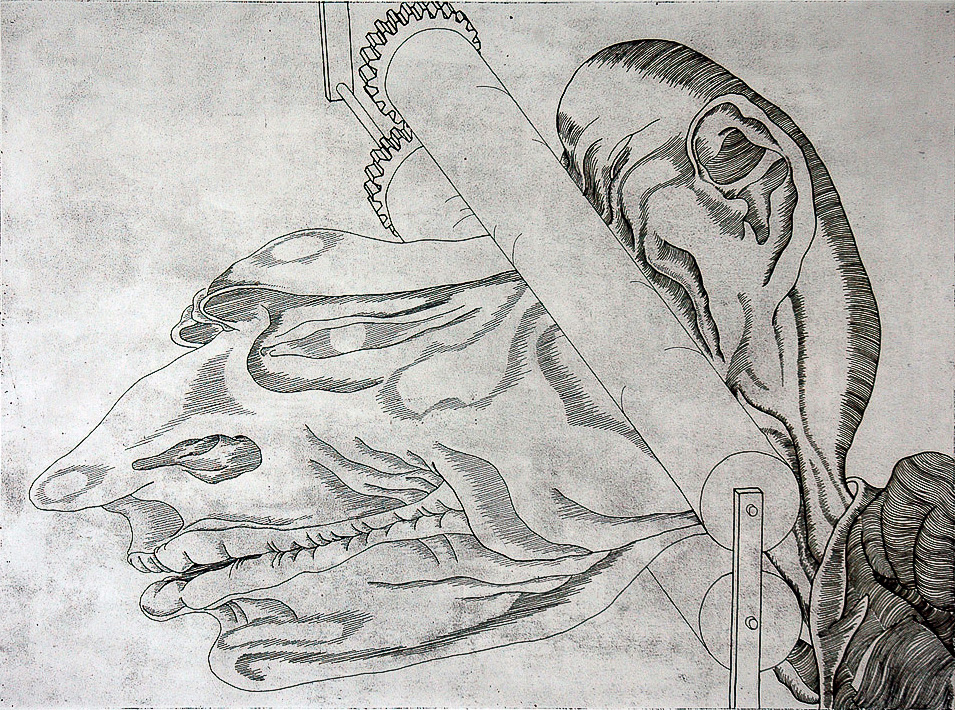
Unpleasant situation (1969), etching 59 x 70 cm

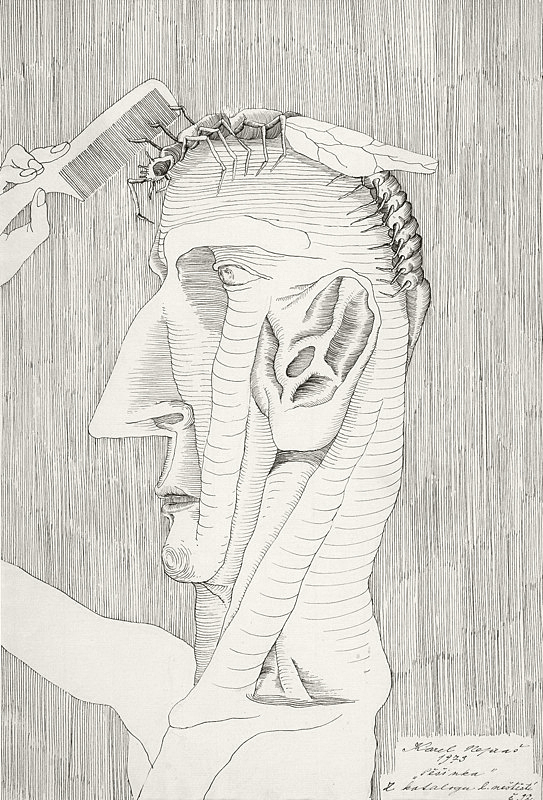
Parting from the catalogue of Human misfortunes (1973)

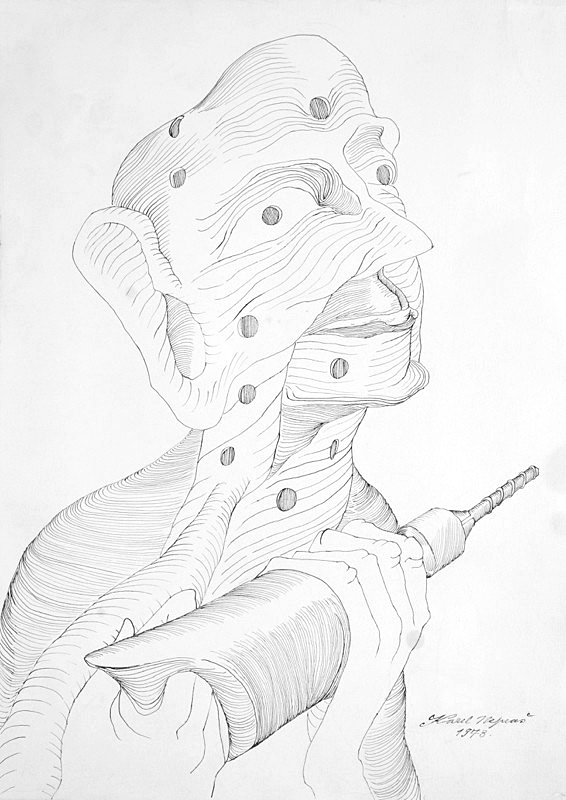
Man with drilling machine (1973)

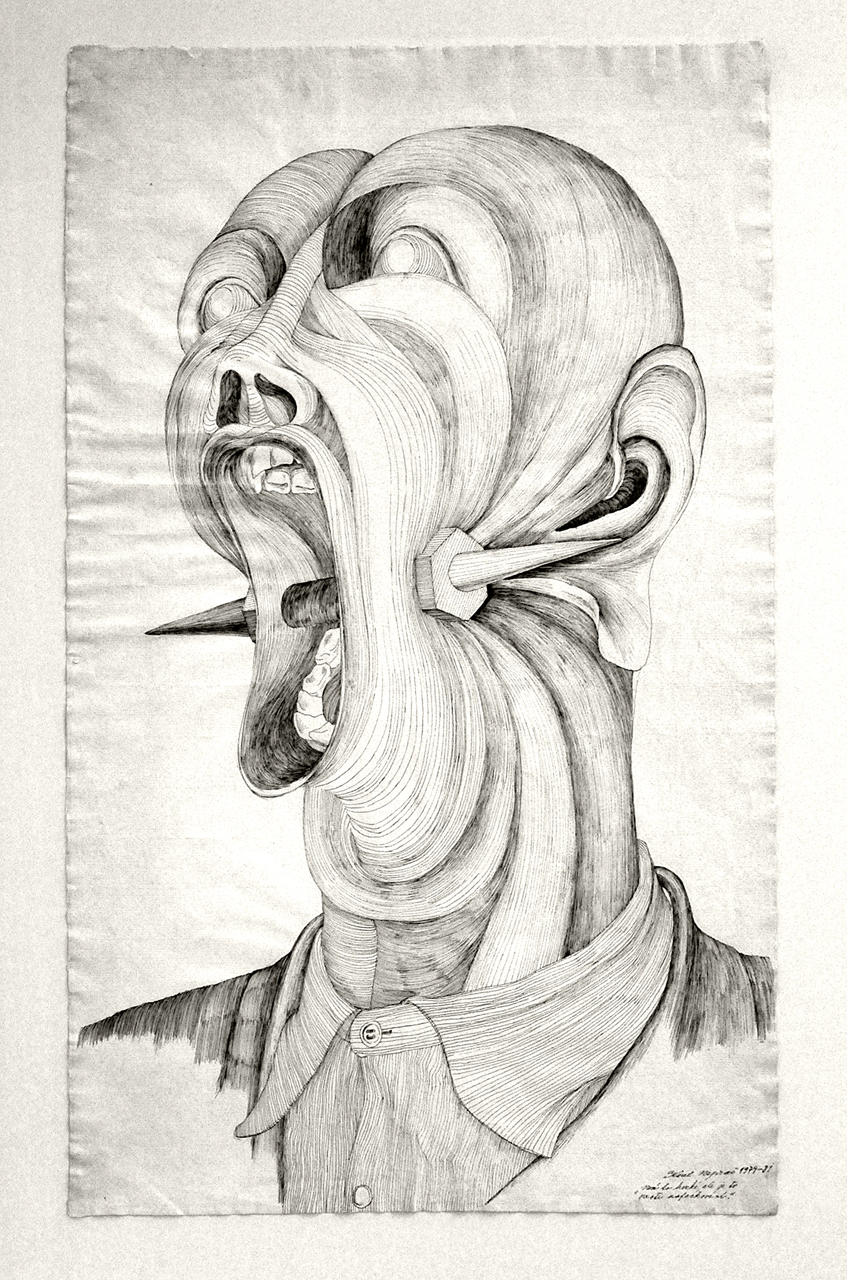
It's not pretty, but it's against slapping (1979–1981)

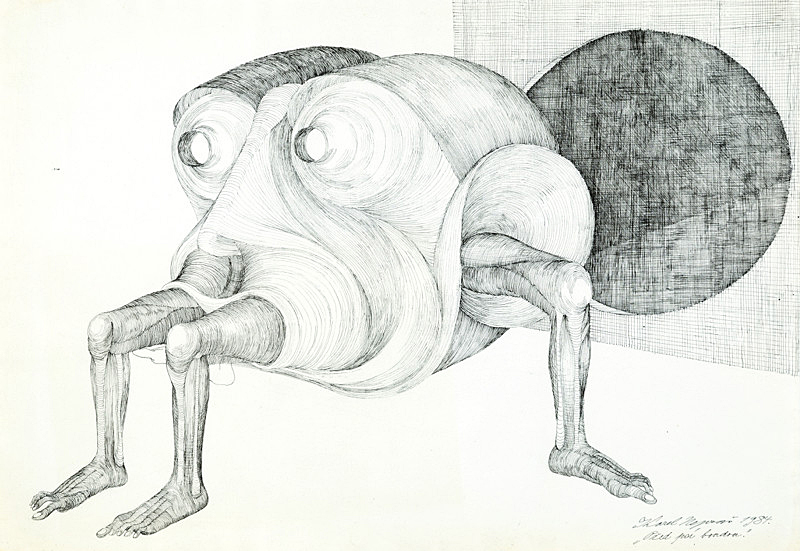
In front of the dog kennel (1984)

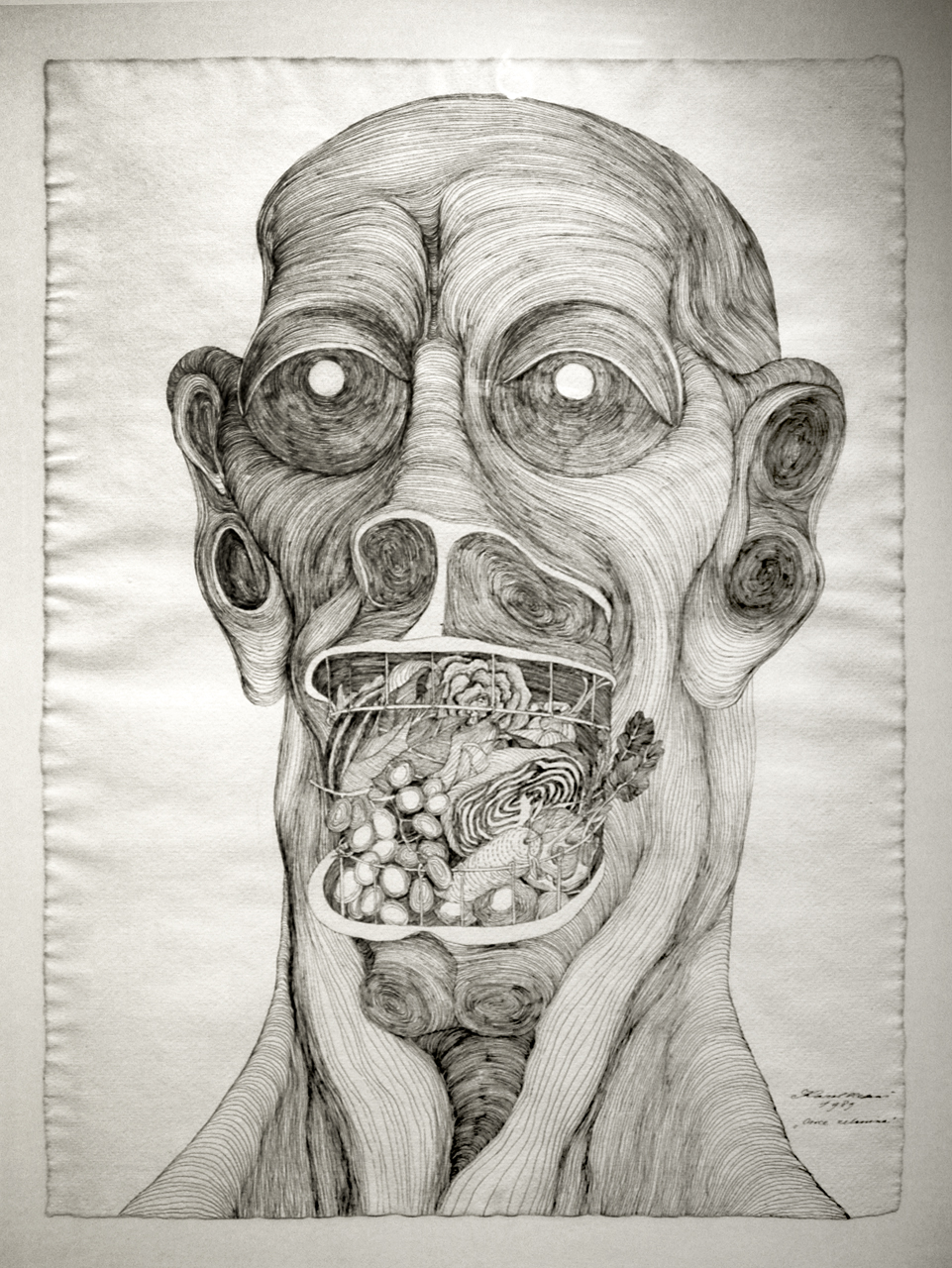
Fruits, vegetables (1989)

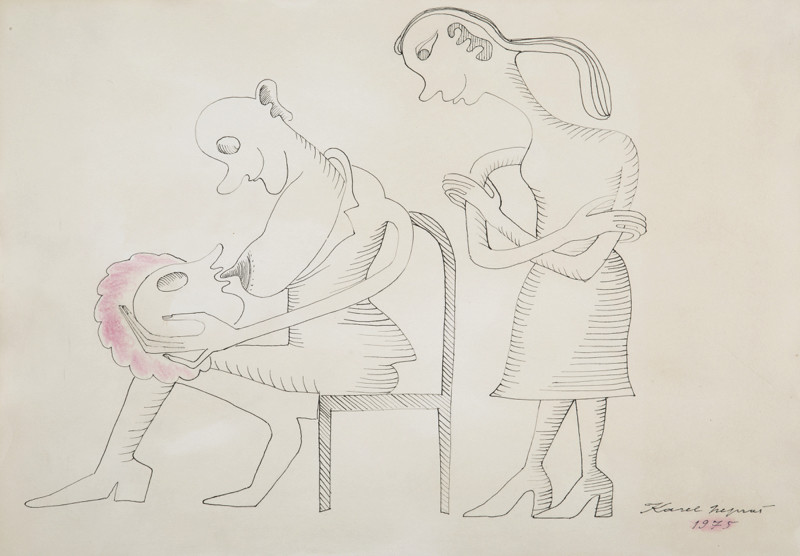
Brest-feeding (1975)

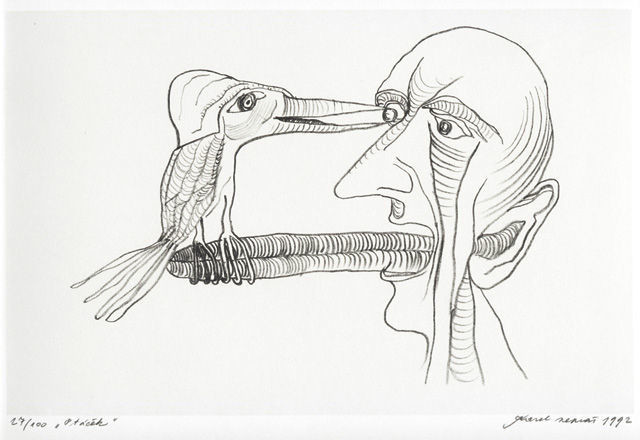
Birdie II (1992)

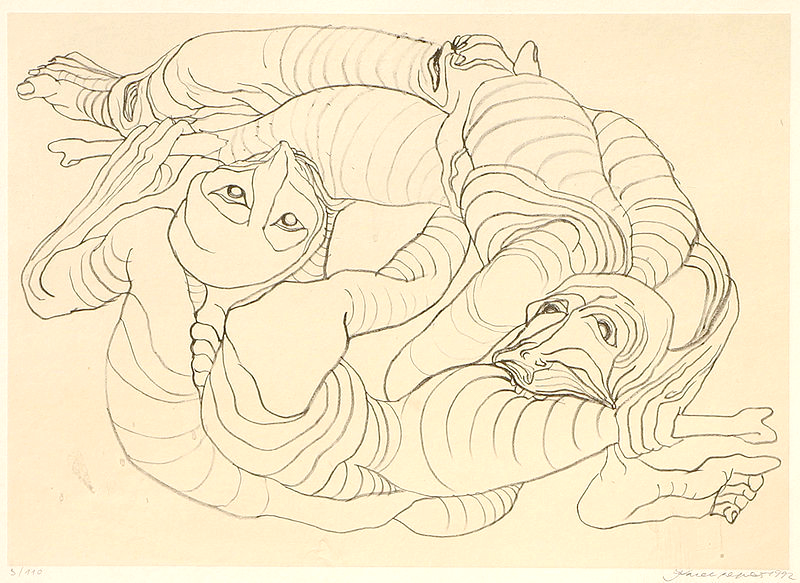
Match (1992), lithograph

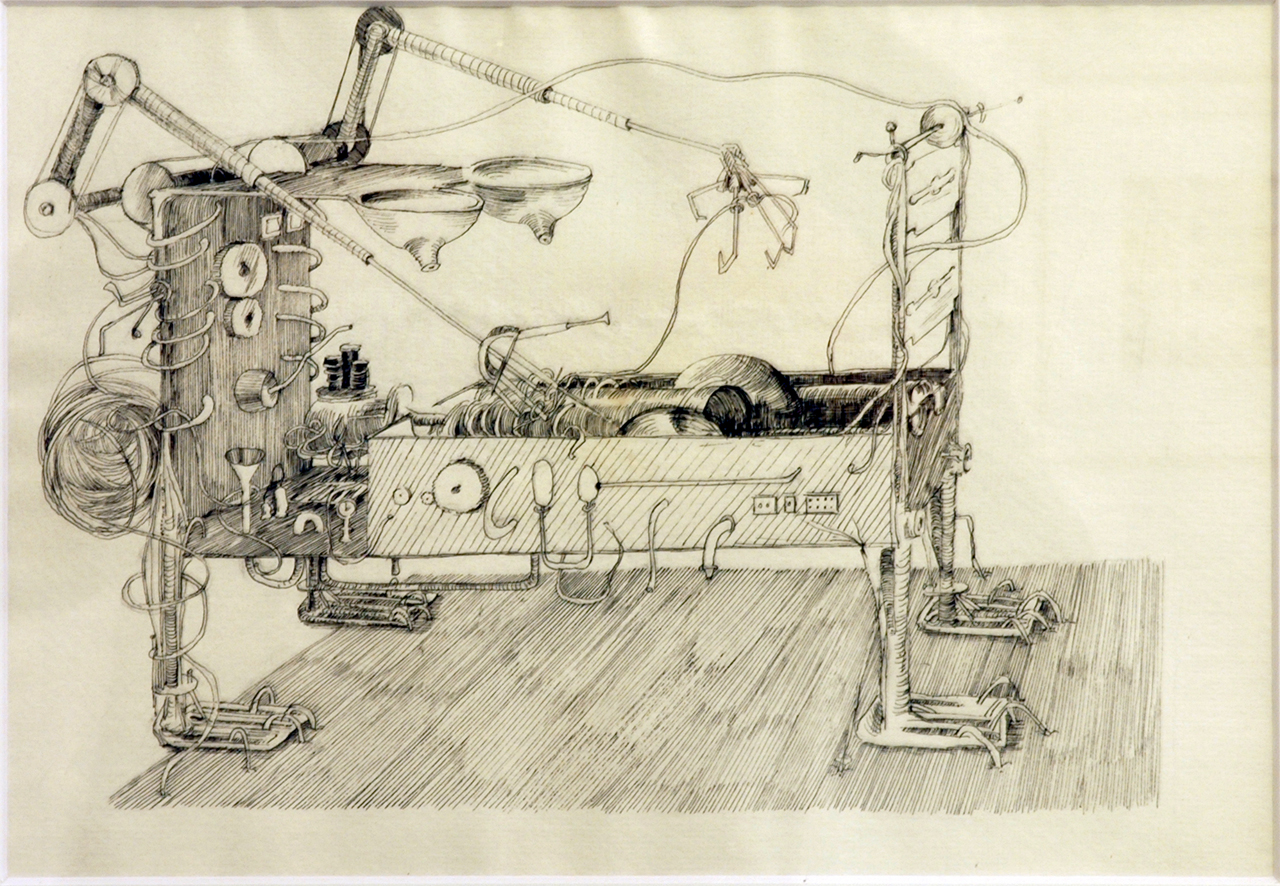
Breasts in a different way (c. 1997)

After a short non-figurative period (1960), Nepraš's subsequent drawings were created in parallel with his sculptural work and preceded the expressive figures and heads with bare bodily structures. Nepraš found inspiration in anatomical illustrations, but did not draw on them directly. He selectively and with metaphorical exaggeration emphasised ears, nasal cavities and dental canals, or tendons, blood vessels and nerves. The drawings reflected absurd plots and gradually reached a greater complexity of meaning (variants of Dialogues, Everything is in a Ball, the catalogue Cycle of Human Misfortunes, 1960s–1980s), while maintaining an ironic outlook and unkind humour.

Nepraš's work has parallels with Karel Kosík's article Hašek and Kafka or the Grotesque World, published in 1963 in connection with a conference on Franz Kafka in Liblice. In it, Kosík develops the metaphor of modern society as an absurd Great Mechanism in which man finds himself helpless in a network of bureaucratic machinery and in a perpetuated alienated reality. Nepraš's graphic works (Unpleasant Situation, 1969) and sculptures from the second half of the 1960s illustrate this feeling by involving various gears and moving parts. A specific personal testimony to the vicissitudes of life are Nepraš's New Year's cards, which in their radicality strike at the core of reality. By the end of the 1960s, their humour had already been replaced by nausea, loneliness, threat, manipulation, oppression and poisoning reality.

Some cycles of drawings were published in books in the 1960s (Totenklagen, Funeral Songs, 1966) and in the 1980s in South Bohemian Gallery in Hluboká nad Vltavou or in samizdat (Trigon publishing house). At the end of the 1980s he illustrated Ladislav Klíma's The Sufferings of Prince Sternenhoch (Paseka, 1990). During the 1990s he made illustrations for new editions of books by Franz Kafka.

In addition to drawings, Karel Nepraš also created numerous prints, mostly using the etching and lithography techniques ('An Unpleasant Situation, Berenice, Birdie).

=== Ceramics and porcelain ===
Ceramic figures of humans and animals (Dog Angel as Monument, Dog Mother and Child as Fountain, 1961) or stylized female torsos date from the late 1950s and early 1960s. Nepraš also used ceramics for structural relief, but in the early 1960s he preferred to work with metal. Some smaller ceramic sculptures were made in parallel with other work into the 1980s.

In 1971, at the ceramic symposium in Hradec Králové, Karel Nepraš created a large assemblage of majolica elements, The Great Fountain (South Bohemian Gallery in Hluboká collection). From the 1980s comes the series of head-fountains made of stoneware pipes, cast iron and plumbing material.

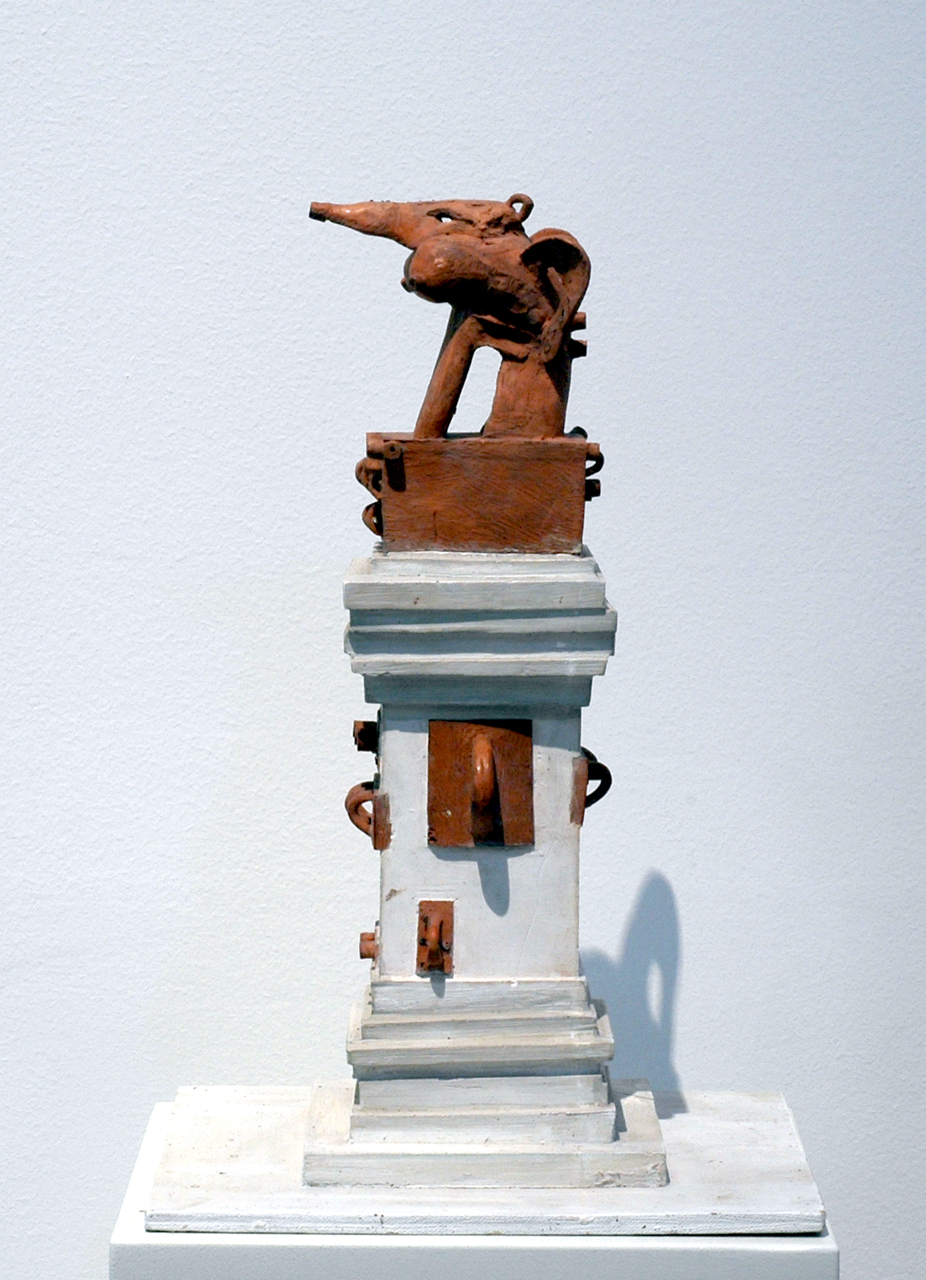
Dog Angel as Monument (1961)

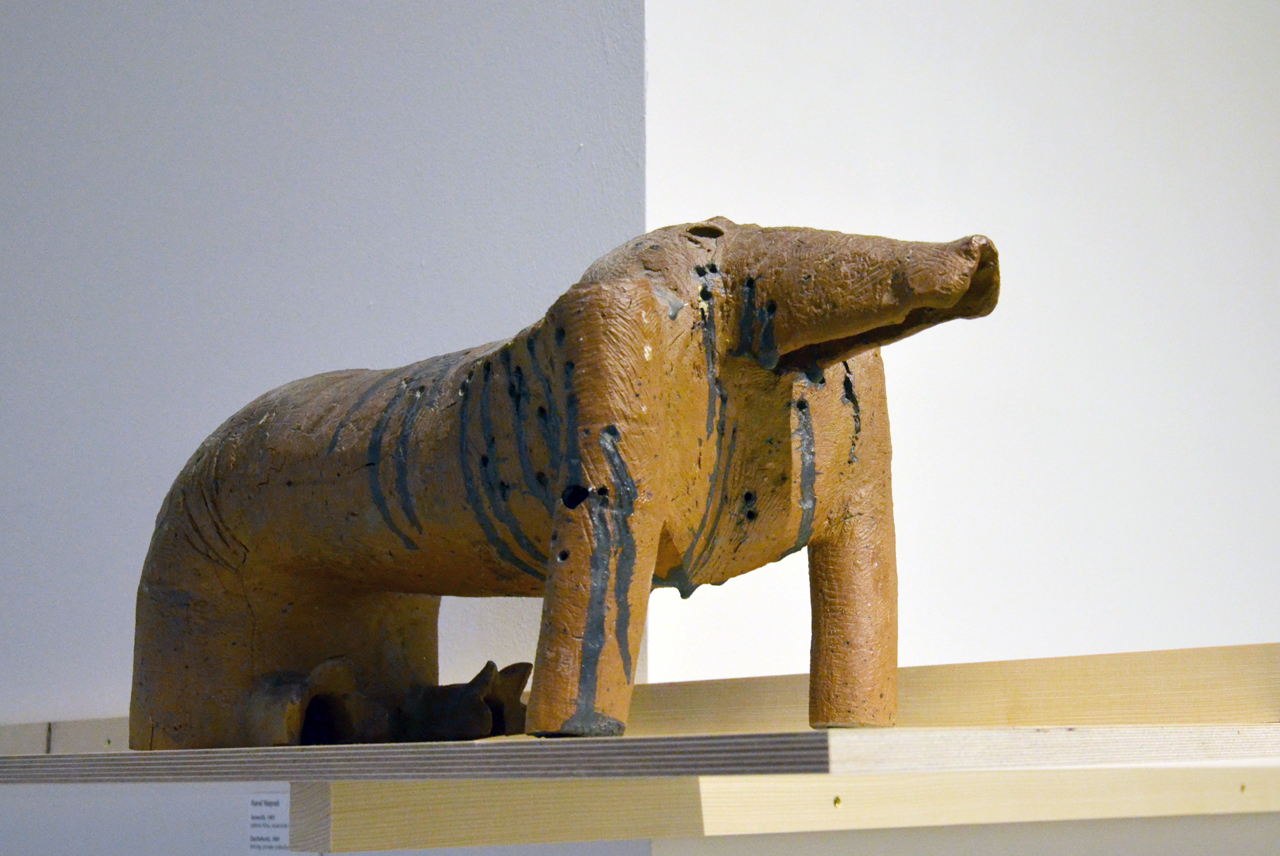
Dachshund (1961)

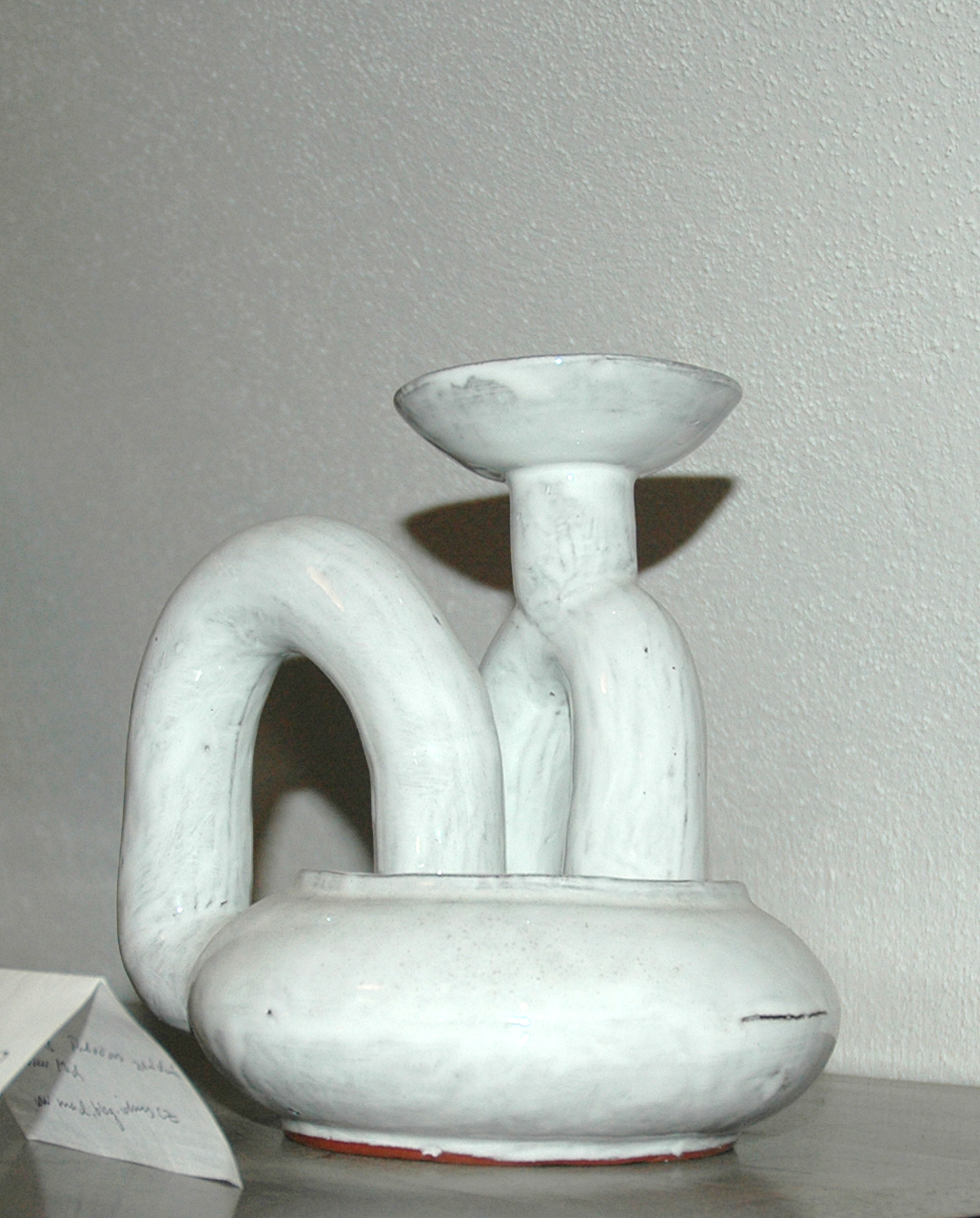
Candlestick-fountain (1970s)

=== Metal sculptures and assemblages (1960s–1970s) ===
The first classically shaped elongated figures (Standing, Woman with Exposed Interior 1959) build on Nepraš's drawings of the time. At the beginning of the 1960s Nepraš created informel copper reliefs (1960, 1961) and then several sculptures made of brass or copper sheet with a distinctive internal structure of ribs and projections (Relief, 1962, Lunette I, 1963, Small Relief, 1963). This was followed by a period of experimentation with galvanized, mostly informel metal sculptures (Hyena, before 1964, Relief, 1964). Nepraš chose this technology, working with the element of random accretion of mass, to speed up the structuring of the surface, but removed the protrusions that did not correspond to his idea before finishing (Galvanized Sculpture, 1961). Later, he switched to welded sculptures inspired by F. Kafka (Portrait of Gregor Samsa 1964, variants of Castle, 1963, 1967) with vegetal motifs or literary elements.

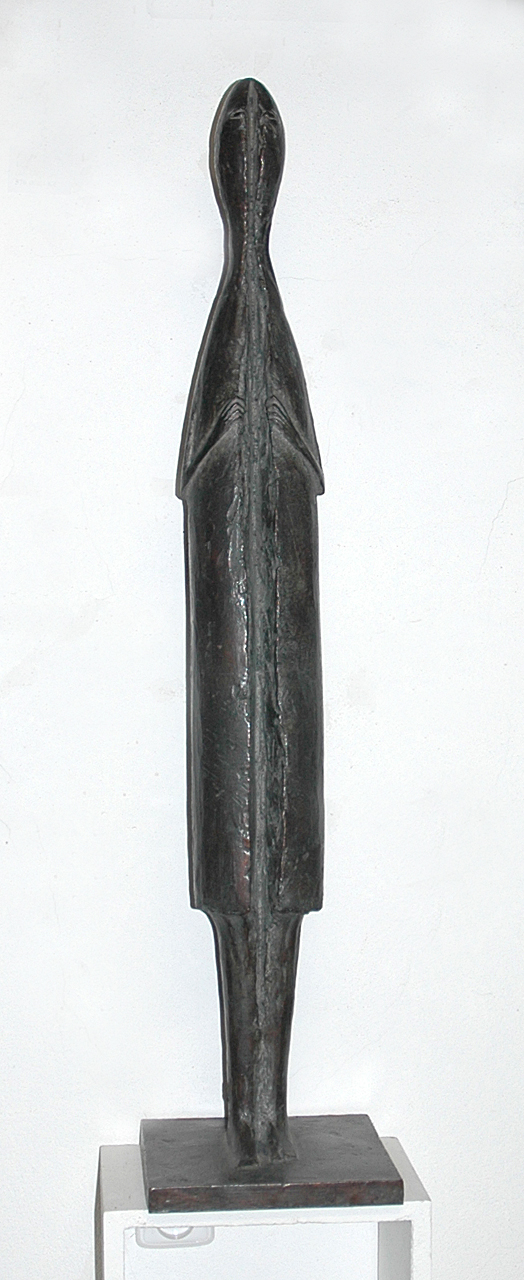
Woman with Exposed Interior (1959)

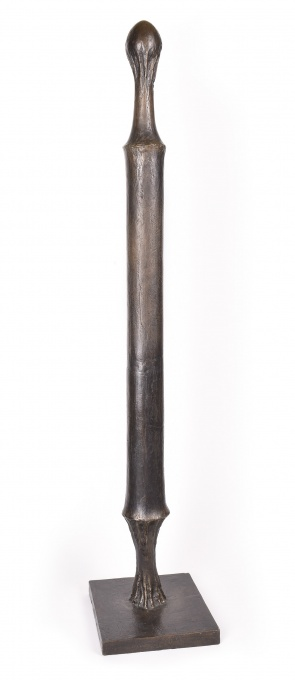
Standing II (1959)

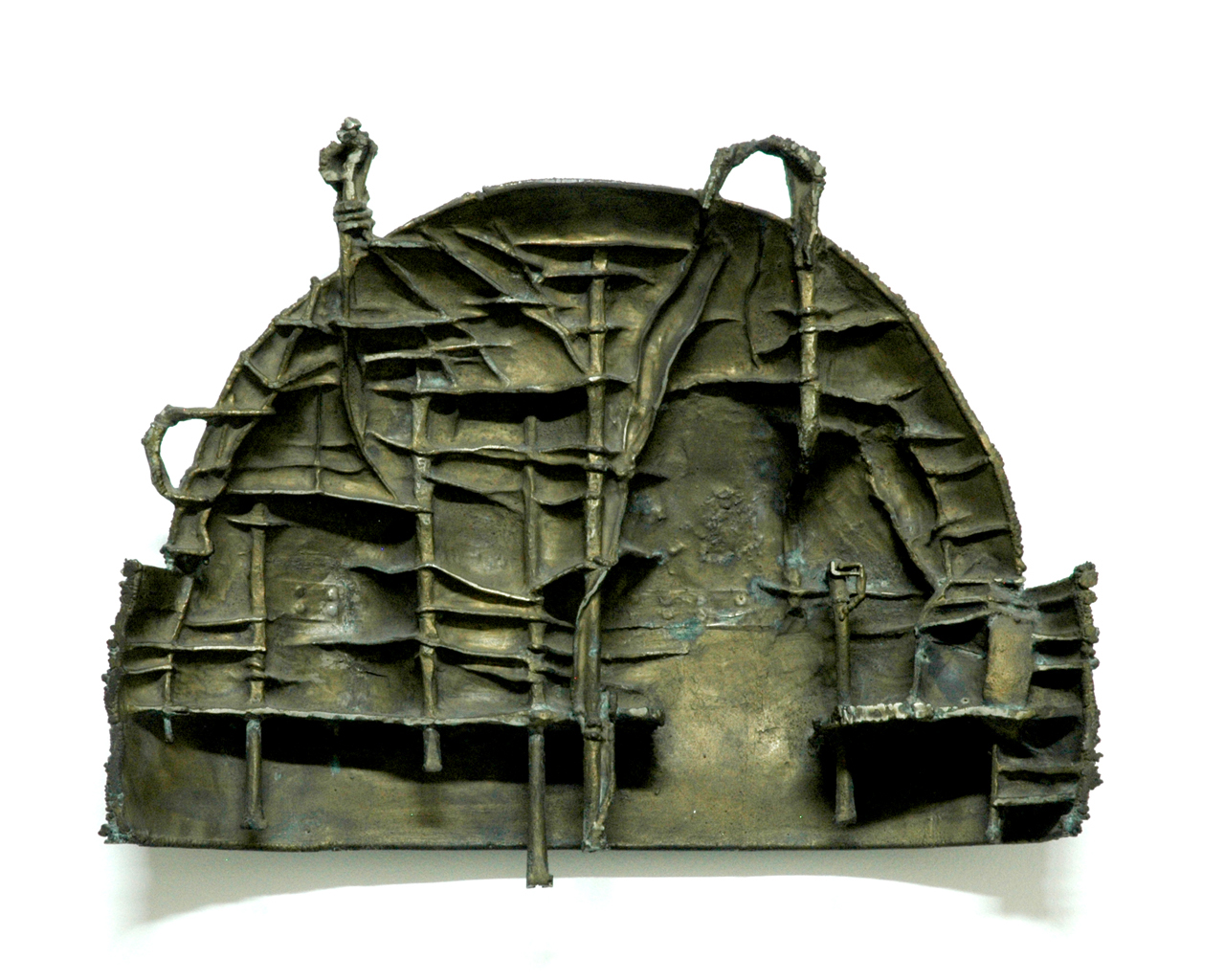
Lunette (1963)

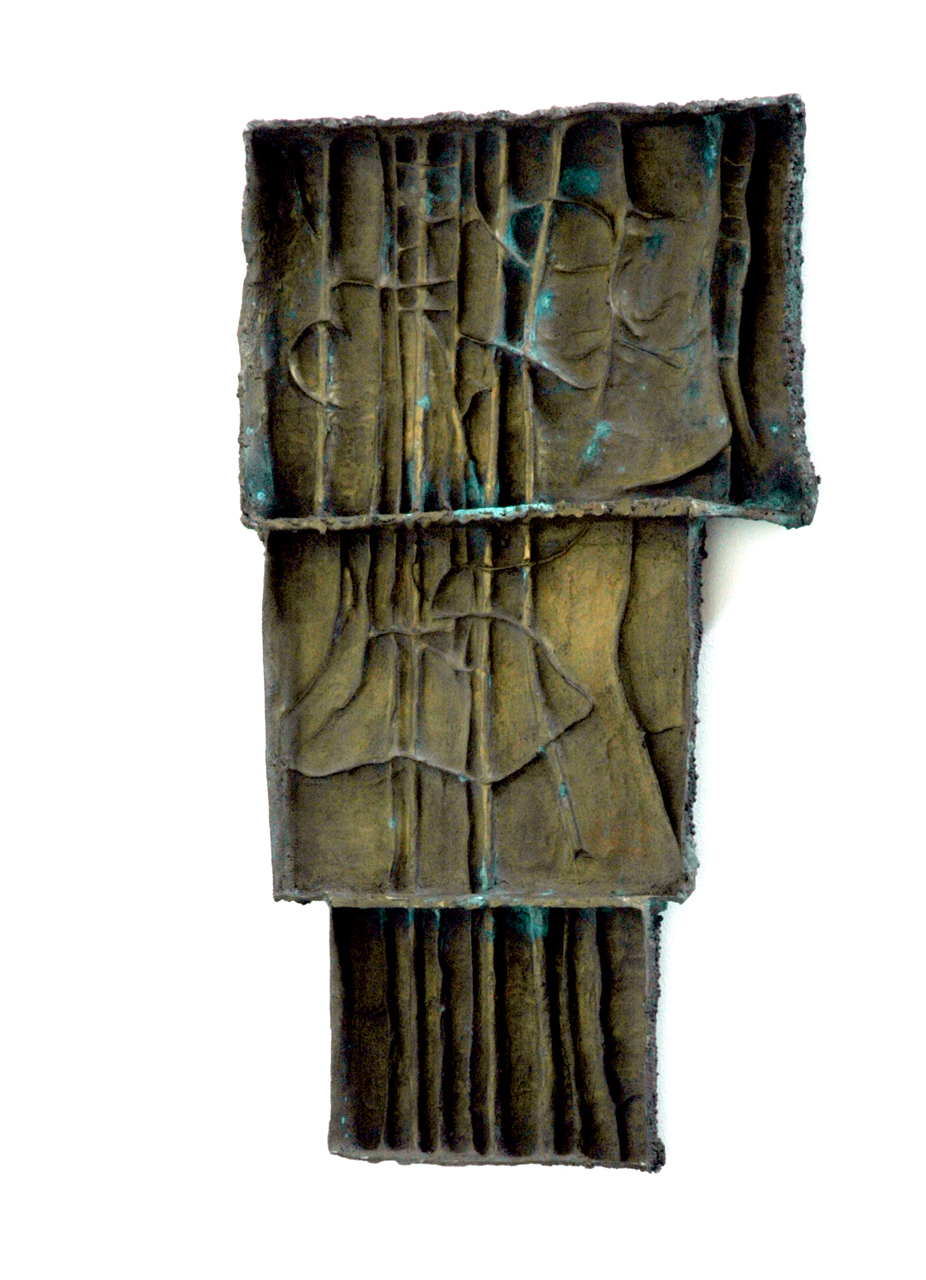
Small relief (1963), National Gallery Prague

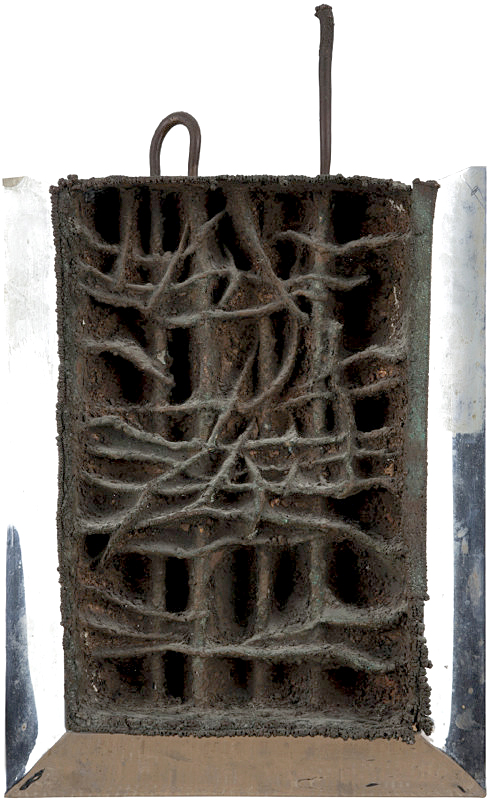
Galvanized relief (1964)

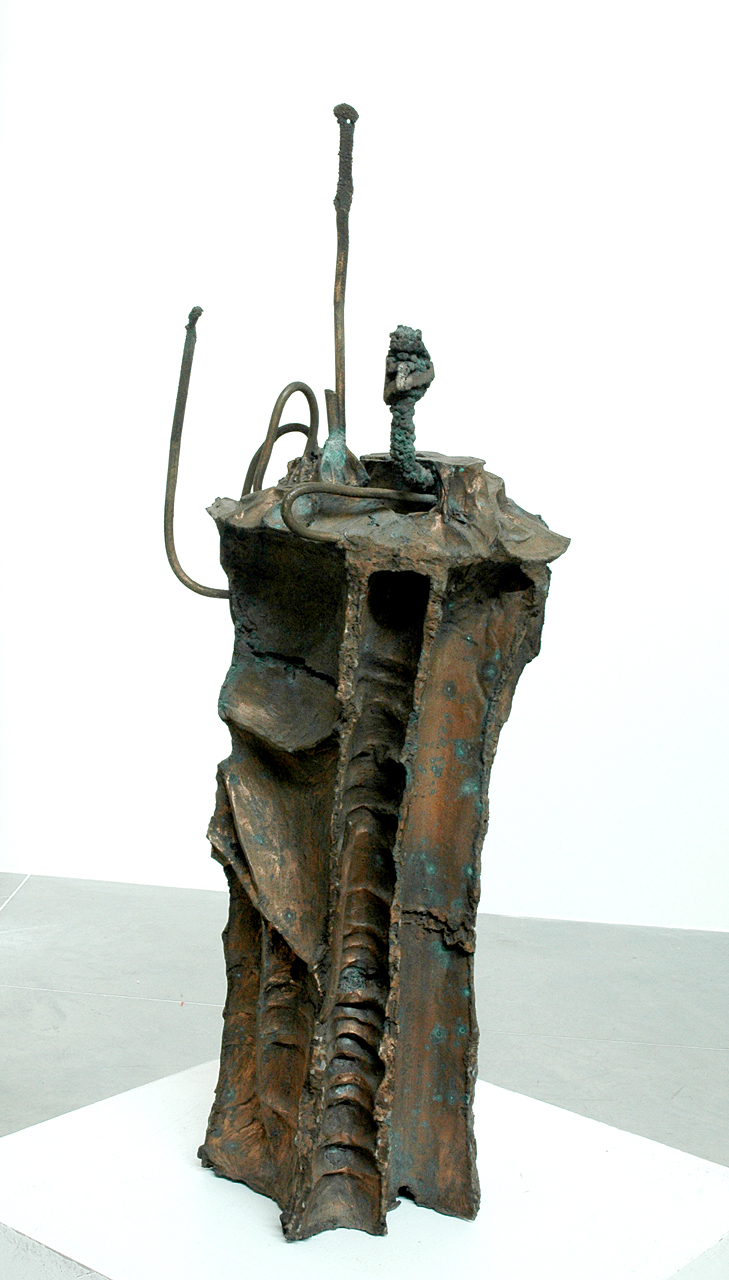
Portrait of Gregor Samsa (1964)

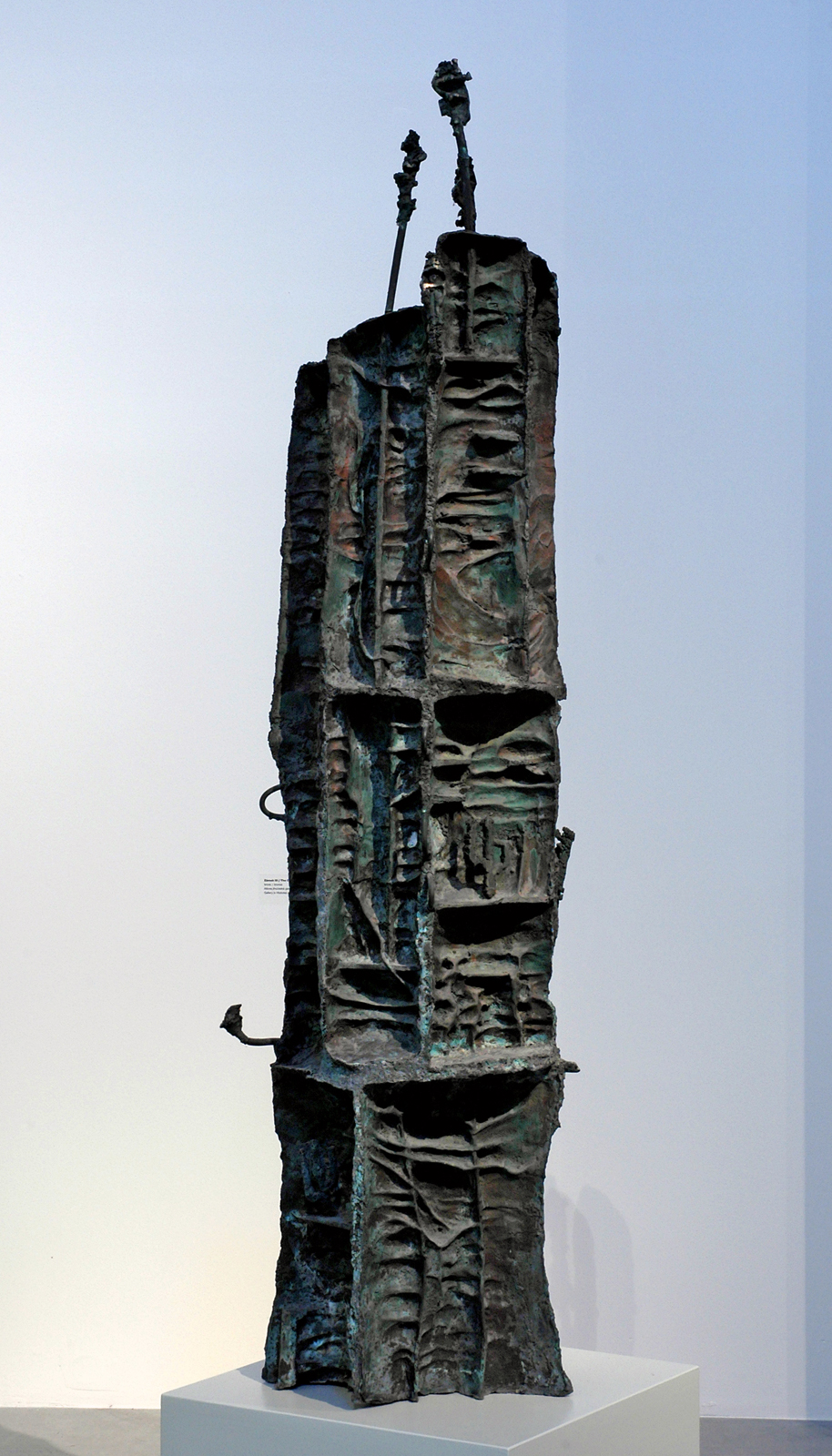
Castle III (1967), Aleš South Bohemian Gallery, Hluboká nad Vltavou

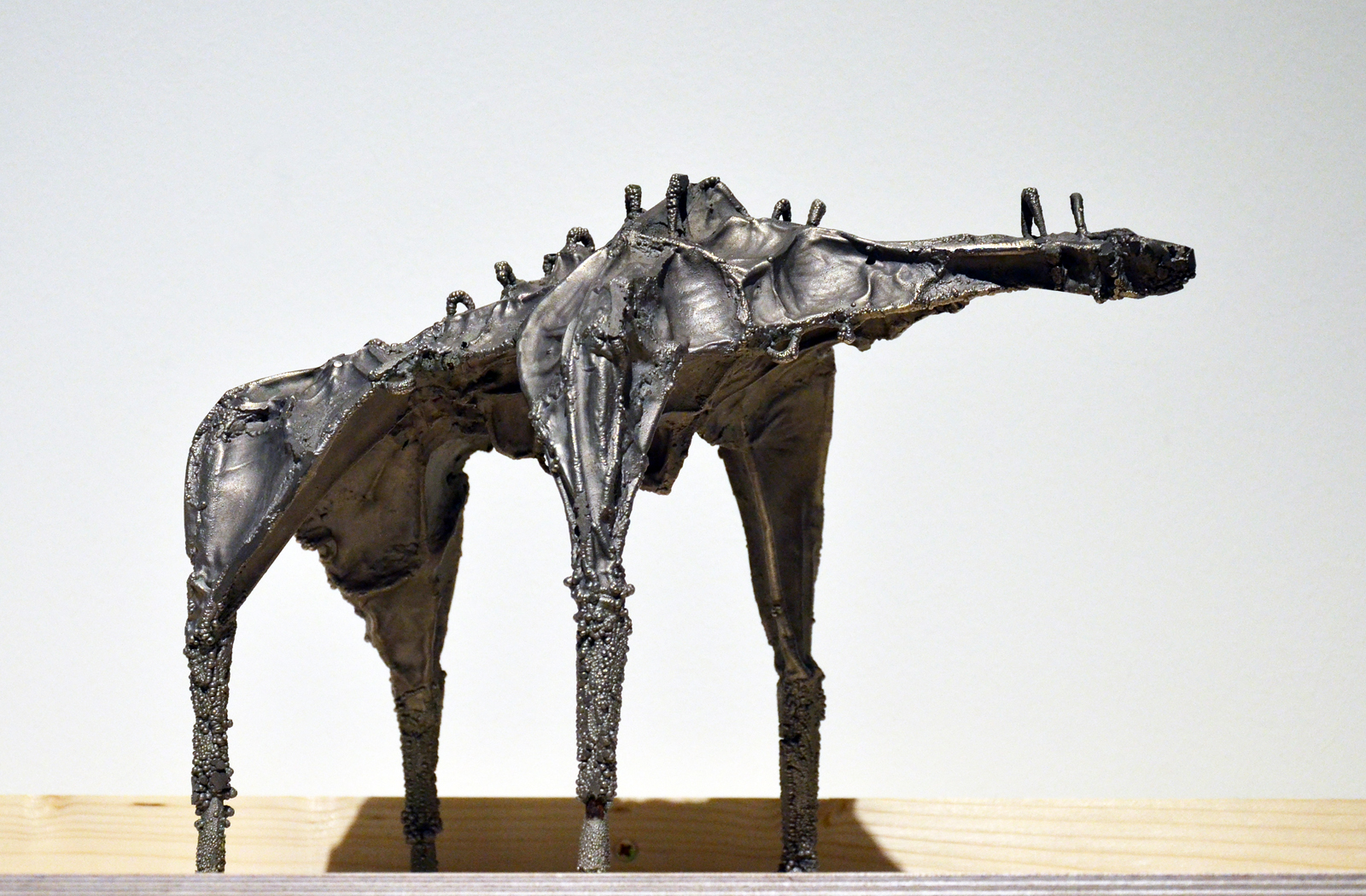
Hyena (before 1964)

In 1964, Karel Nepraš made headpieces out of wires, textiles and red lacquer for a forthcoming puppet ballet based on Edgar Allan Poe and libretto by Jan Koblasa, with music by Rudolf Komorous (The Mask of the Red Death), where the movement of the puppets was to be replaced by variable lighting. The figural type was already fixed in the drawings, but the necessary stylization in the construction of the sculpture also meant a shift in meaning. The sculptures were created using a very laborious technique as assemblages of wires, tubes and found metal objects joined with textiles or women's stockings and fixed with epoxy, usually colored with red lacquer to enhance the plasticity. The raw appearance of the skinless heads allowed for a variety of expressions, ranging from indifference to despair, anxiety and threat. The artist originally intended to cast the sculptures in bronze, but eventually preferred the effect of the raw material, and only some smaller figures created in a similar manner were cast (Listener of Music 1976/77). At that time Nepraš is definitely abandoning established sculptural practices and academic craft, but he is not replacing the sculpture with an object. He organically combines ready-made and classical figurative sculpture. He works with the banal objects he chooses to construct his works in a purely sculptural manner, exploiting their original meaning potential and specific sculptural qualities. He incorporates them into his own new artistic structure, the conception of which further develops the tradition of monumental figuration.

Šmidra group had its own mythology with Moroa, the sister of Demona from the novel by Ladislav Klíma, who combines angelic feminine fragility with afterlife horror. In Nepraš's attractive horror conception, his three versions of Moroa (1965–1967) are skinless anatomical monsters, assembled from wires covered with fabric and painted with white, pink or red lacquer. Some early sculptures, originally derived from puppets, were not sufficiently self-supporting on a larger scale and had to be additionally reinforced (Moroa Called Berkciade, 1966). The sculpture Sitting (1966) was created simultaneously with The Great Dialogue (1966). In the field of sculpture, Nepraš's contribution to the world of post-abstract assemblage, boldly based on satirical grotesque, is one of the most original.

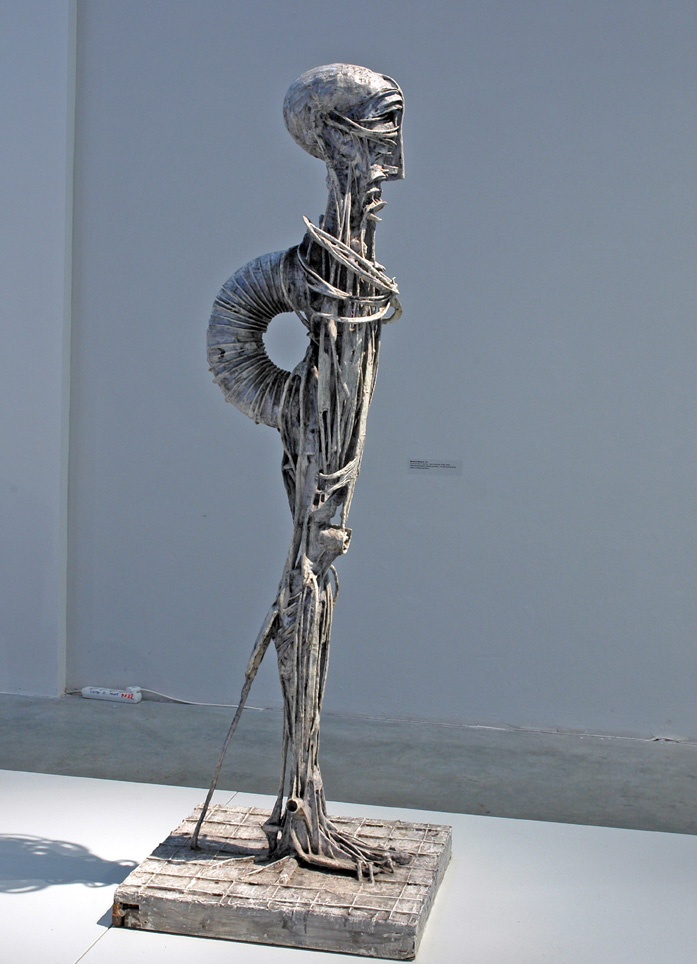
Moroa II (1966), metal structure, textile, lacquer, h. 176 cm

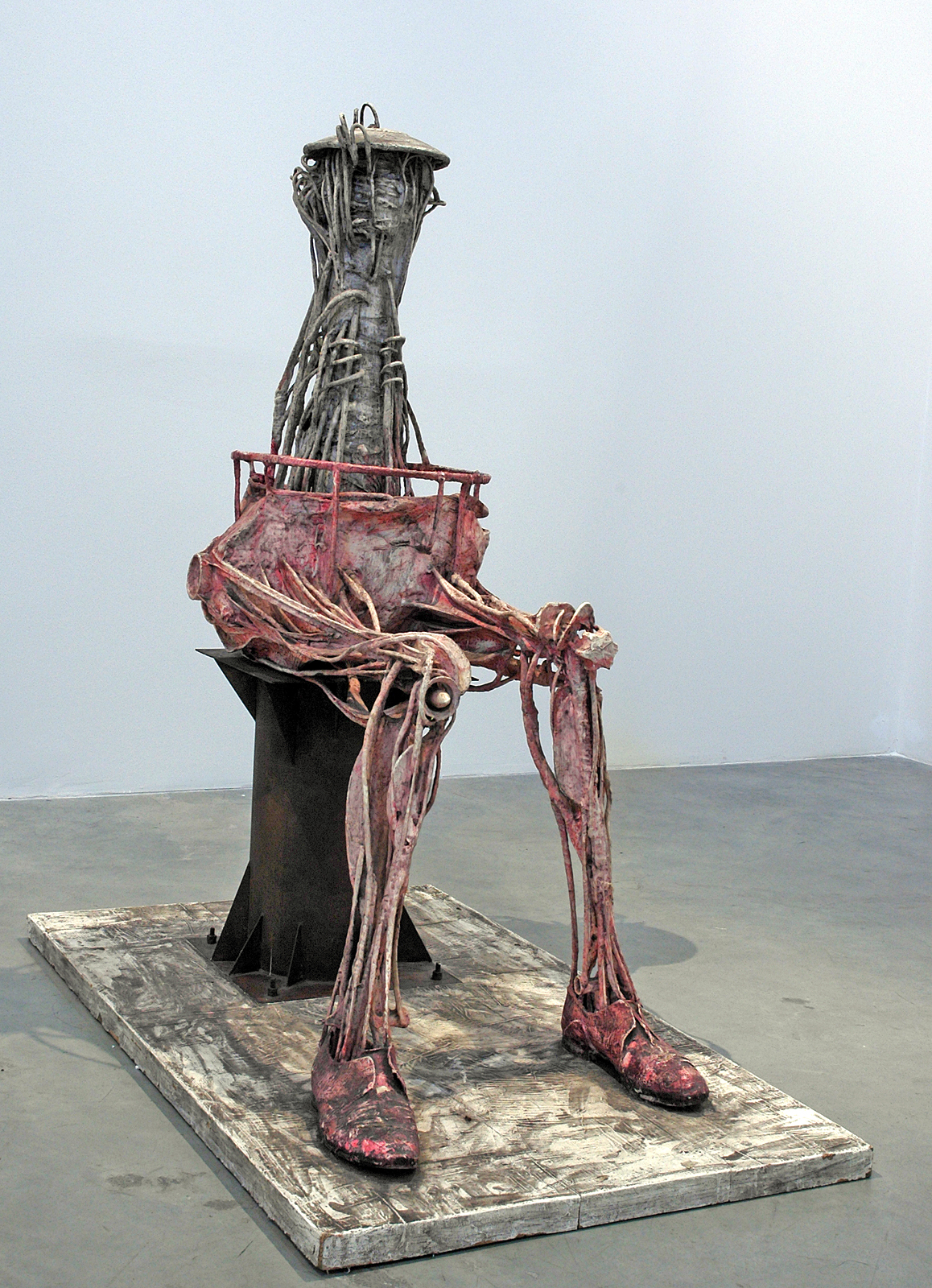
Sitting (1966)

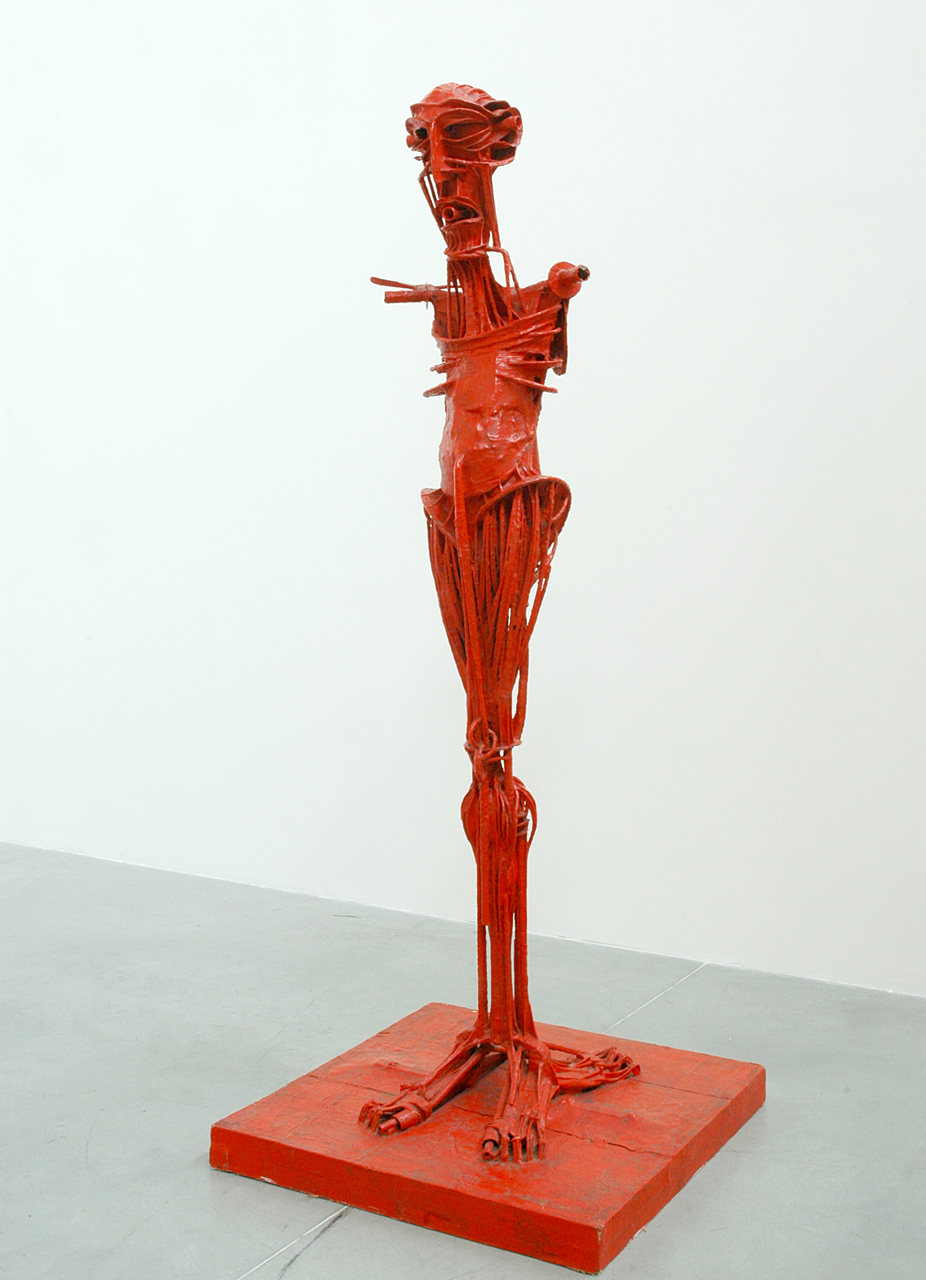
Swell - Moroa III (1967)

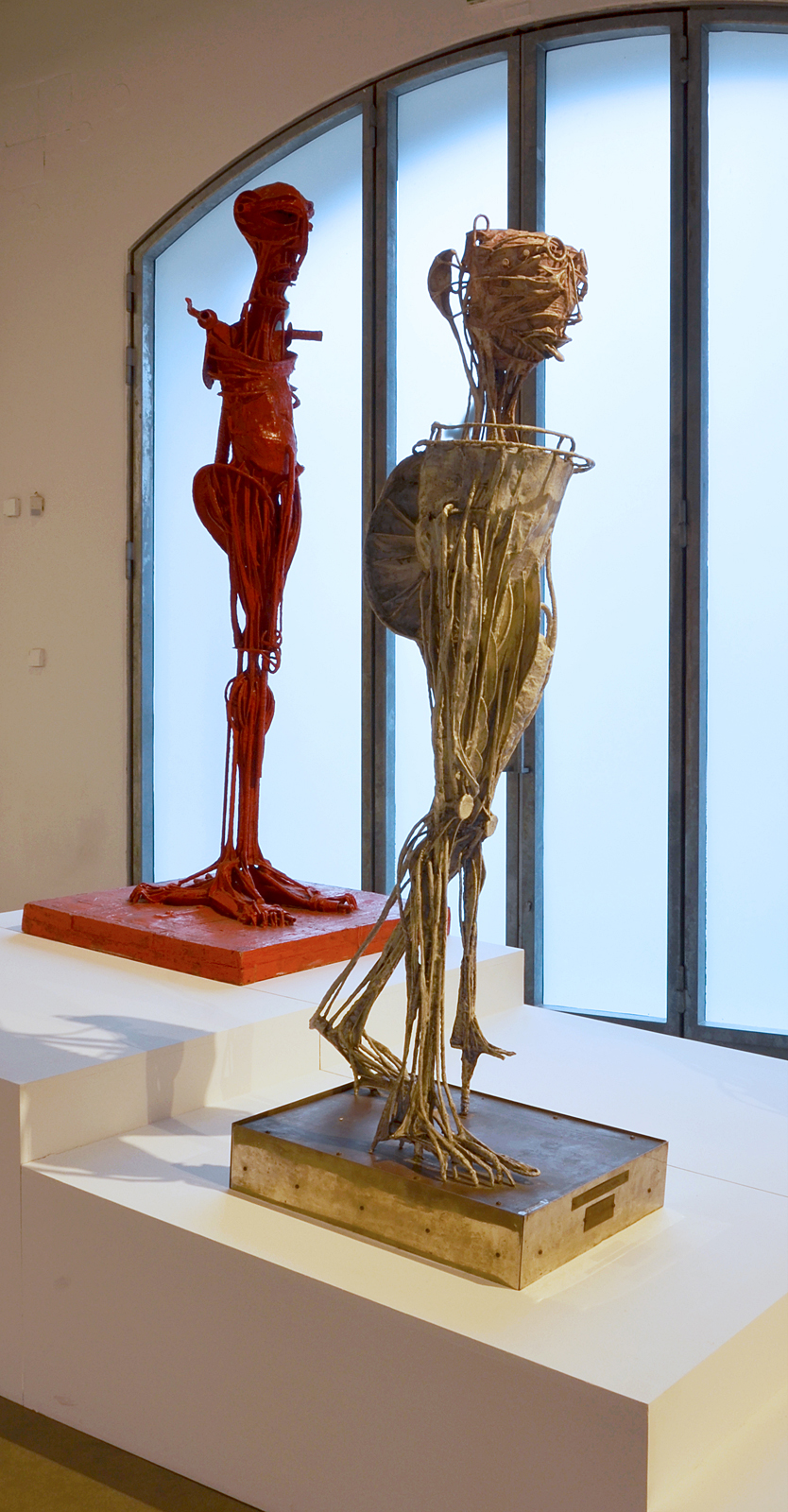
Moroa Called Berkciade (1965), Swell - Moroa III (1967)

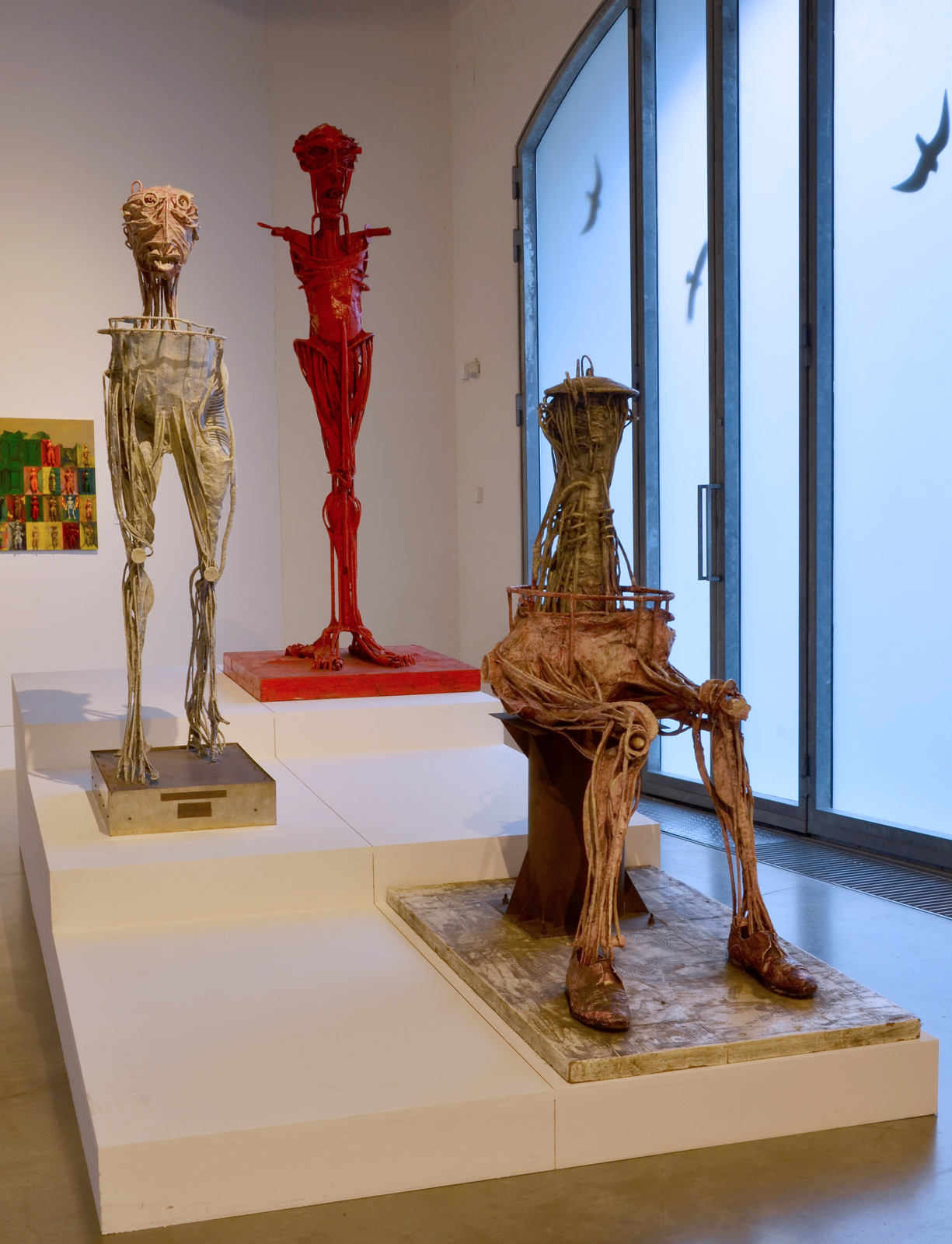
Sitting, Moroa I and III (1965–1967)

In the second half of the 1960s Nepraš created a drawing and three sculptural versions of Dialogue (Dialogue, 1965, Dialogue II, 1967) of which The Great Dialogue (1966) became a major work of Czech modern sculpture and is on permanent display at the National Gallery in Prague. Next came a large seven-figure sculpture Family (1967–1969), made of welded metal parts and tubes wrapped in textile and partly using some tools (rakes, pitchforks). At that time Nepraš used only bright red nitrocellulose lacquer to finish the work, which unified the surface.

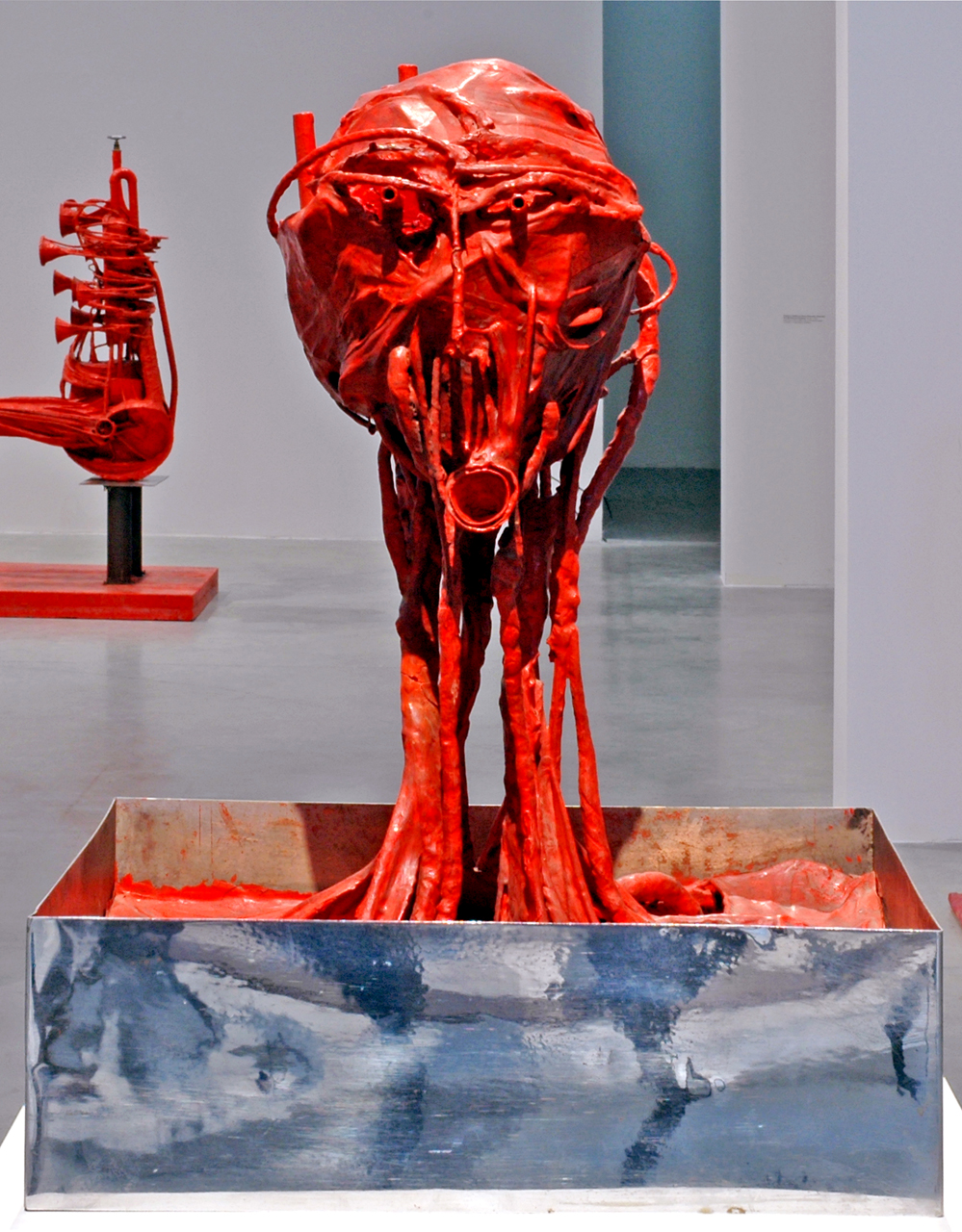
Head (1965)

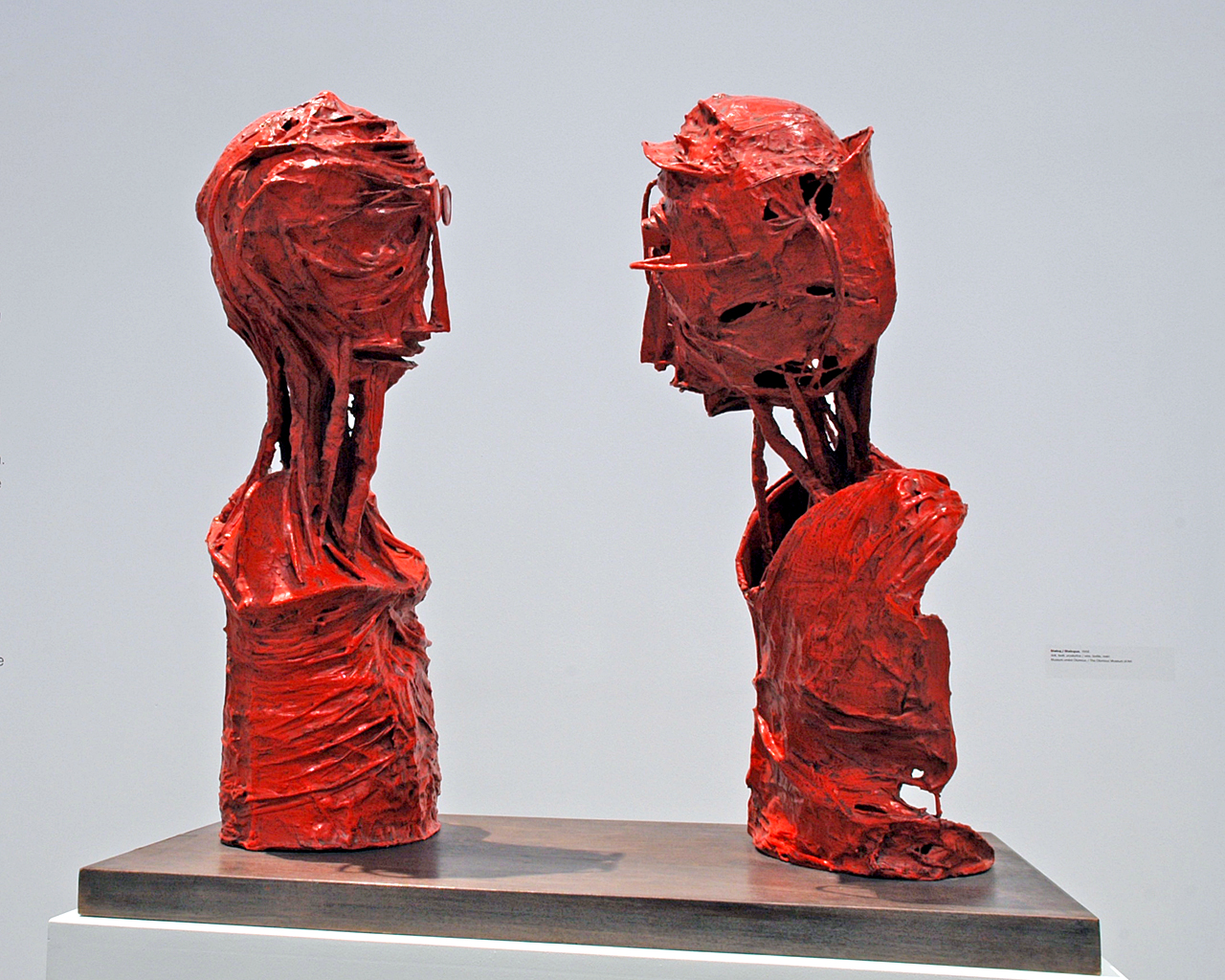
Dialogue (1965)

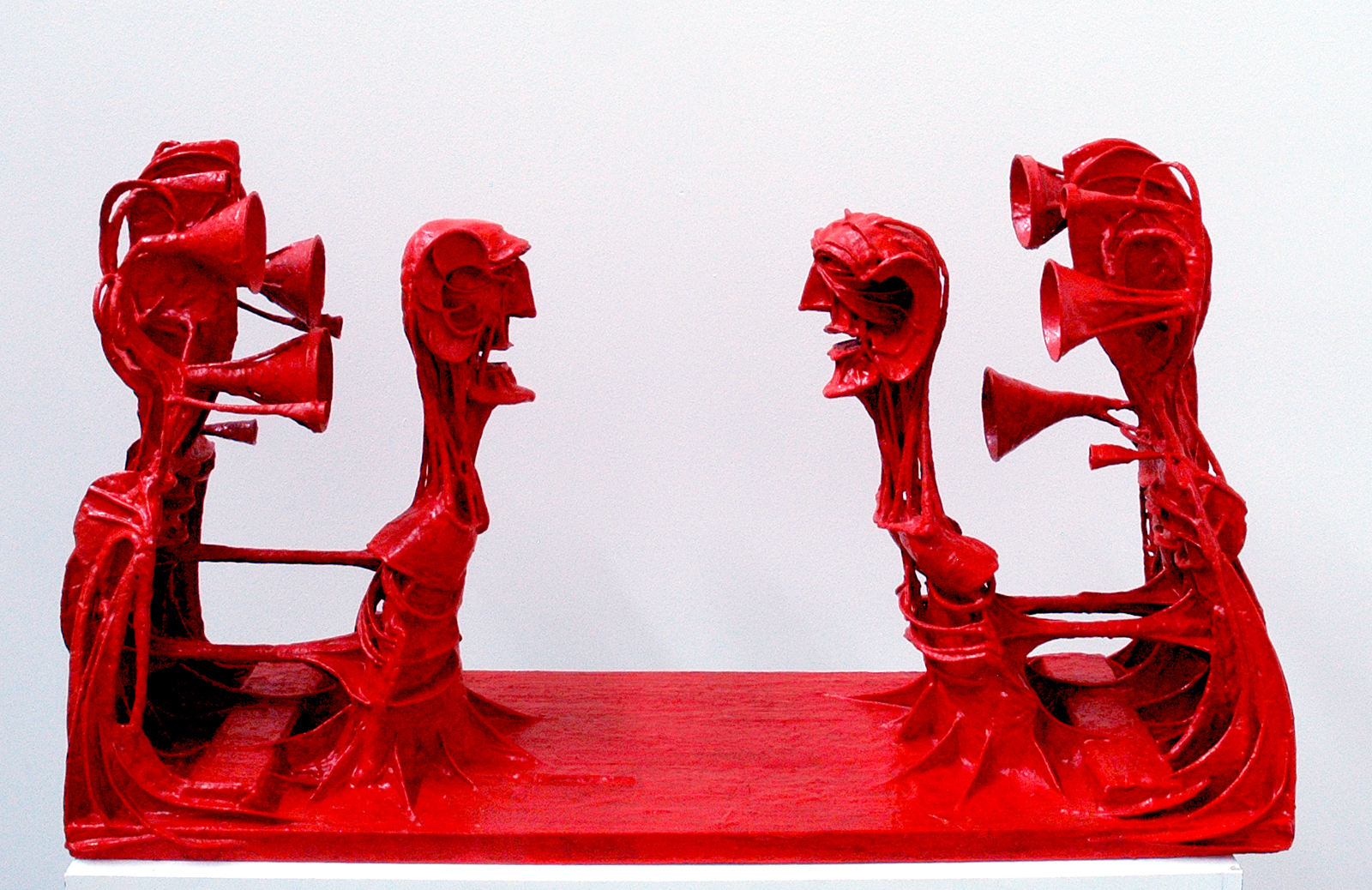
Dialogue II (1967)

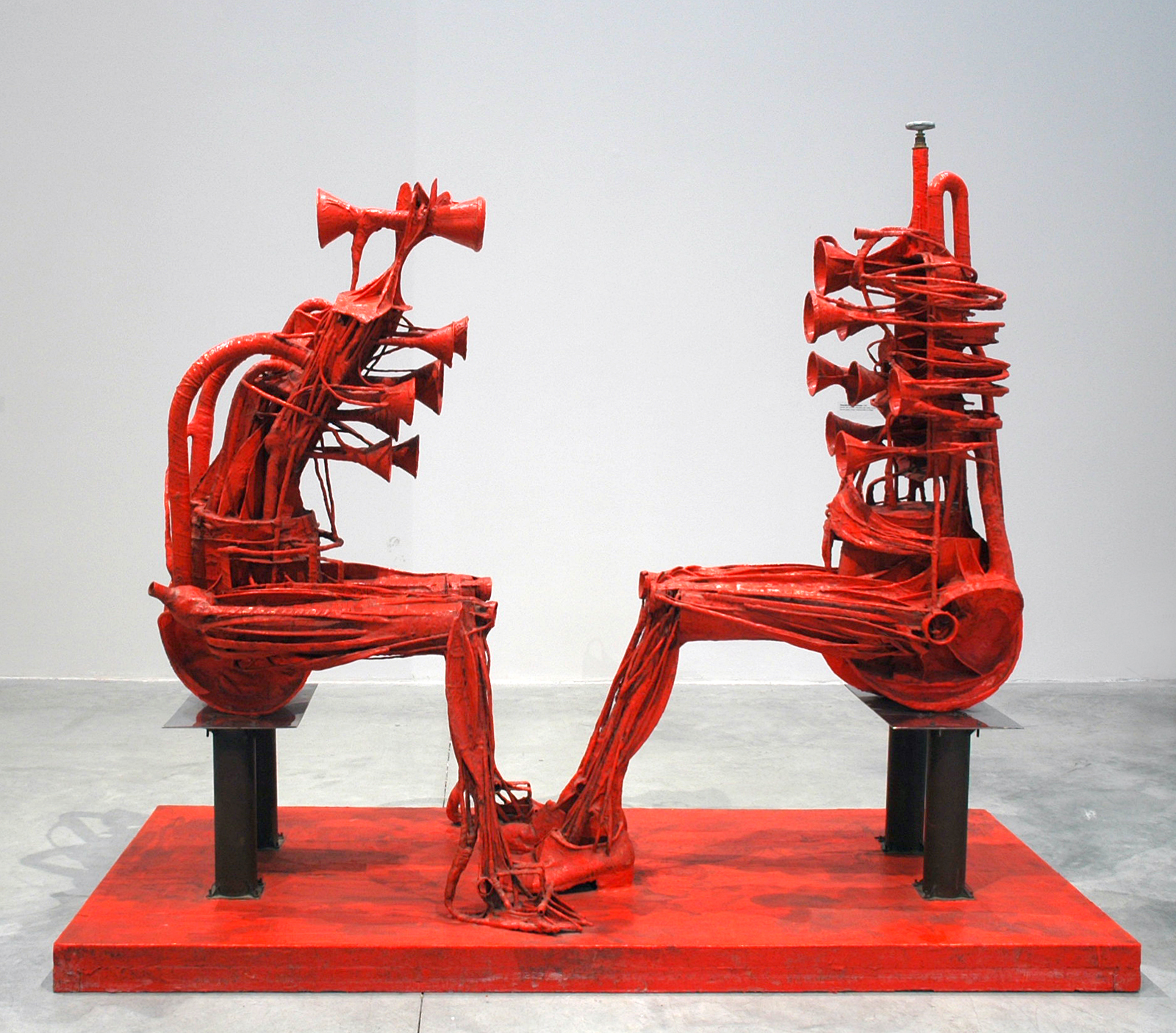
The Great Dialogue (1966), National Gallery Prague

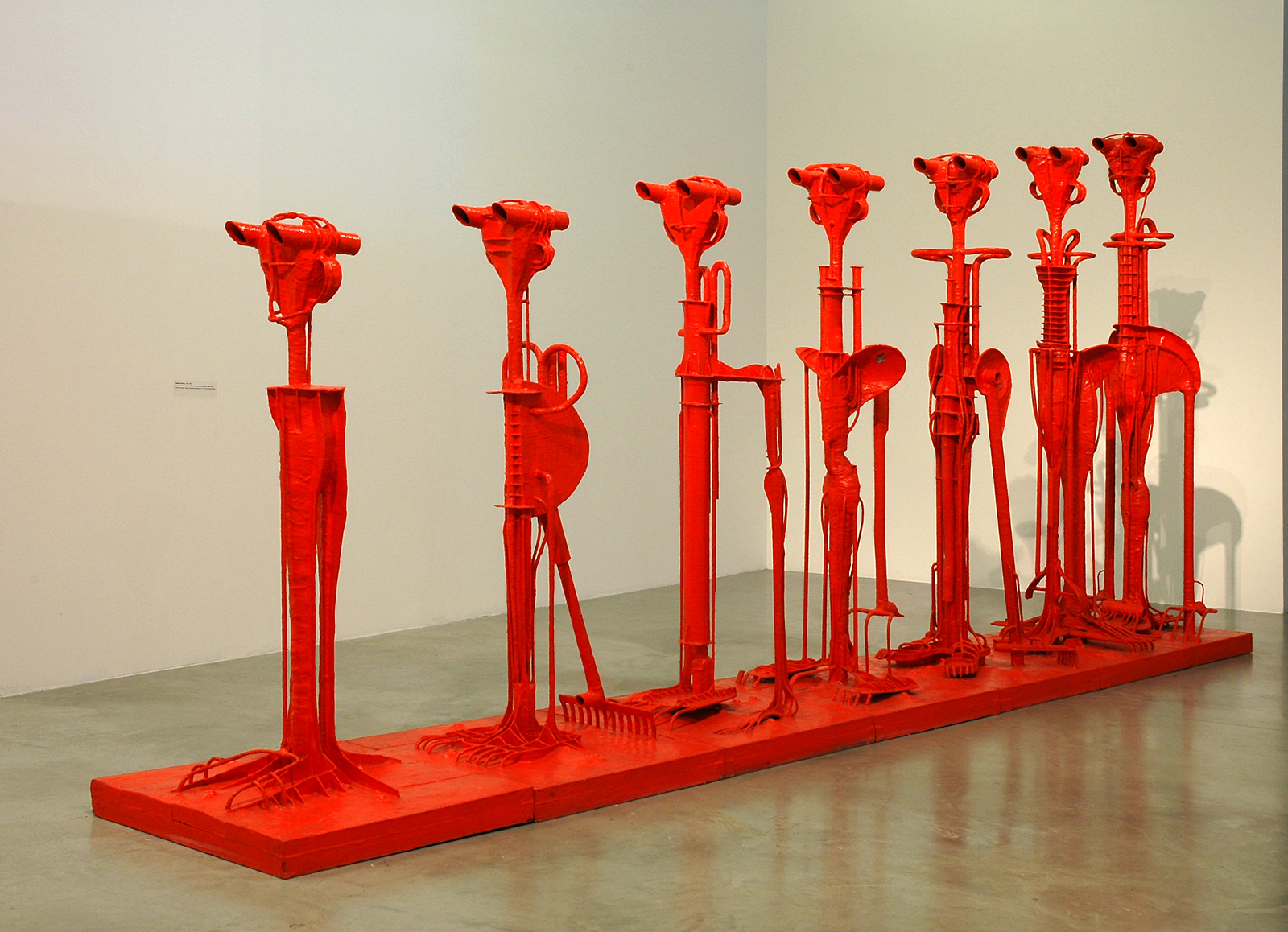
Family (1967–1969)

Nepraš gradually began to incorporate movable elements into his sculptures, at first only as non-functional cranks that did not move anything (Head - Grinder, 1960s), but his version of Dialogue from 1969 to 1970 already contains a horizontal cogged track on which a head moves between two torsos. He also tried to involve the audience (Just keep rotating, 1967). In the 1970s, he created another series of distinctively red-coloured smaller sculptures made of wires and other metal elements, wrapped in textiles (Red Head, 1975, Head, 1977).

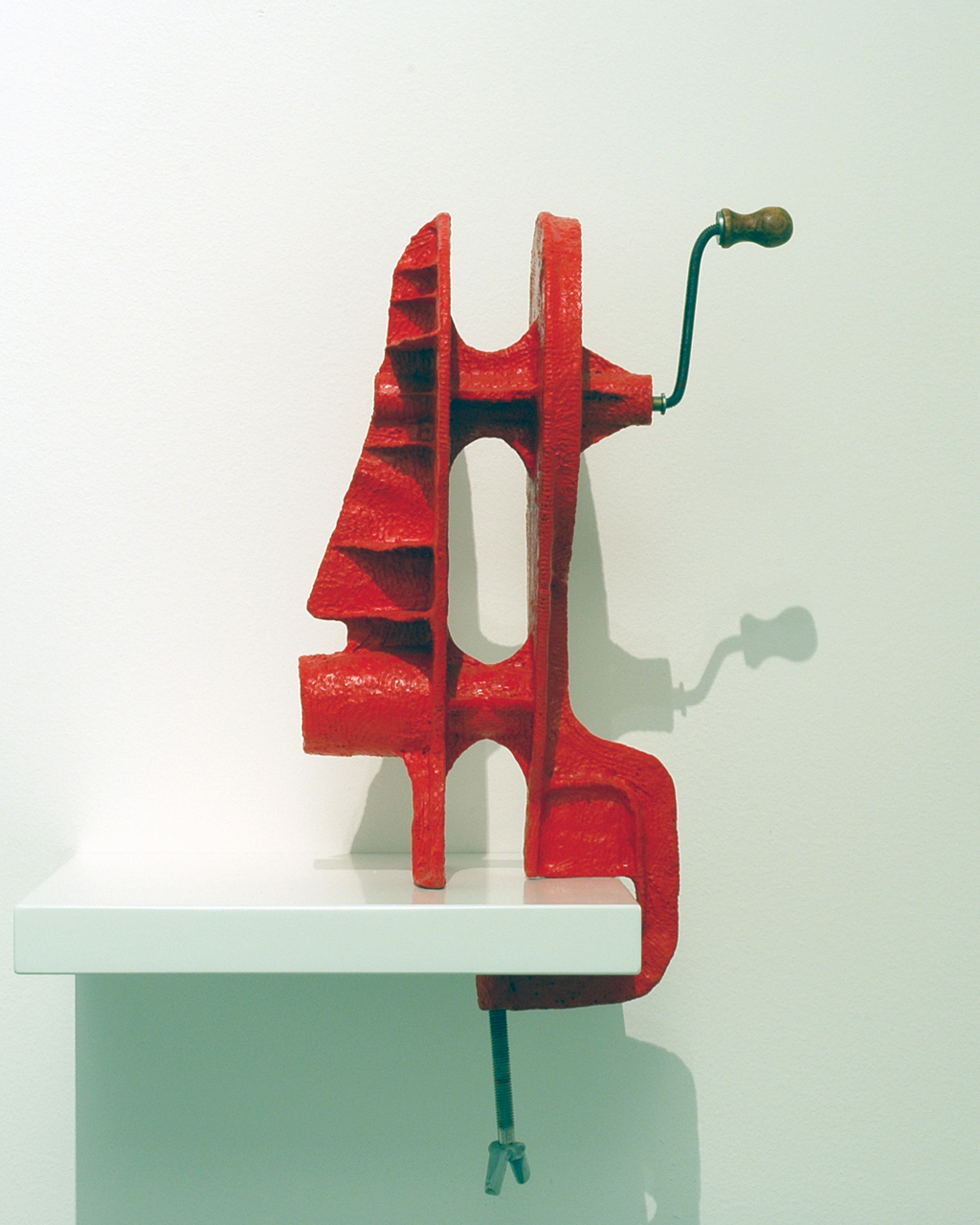
Head - Grinder (1960s)

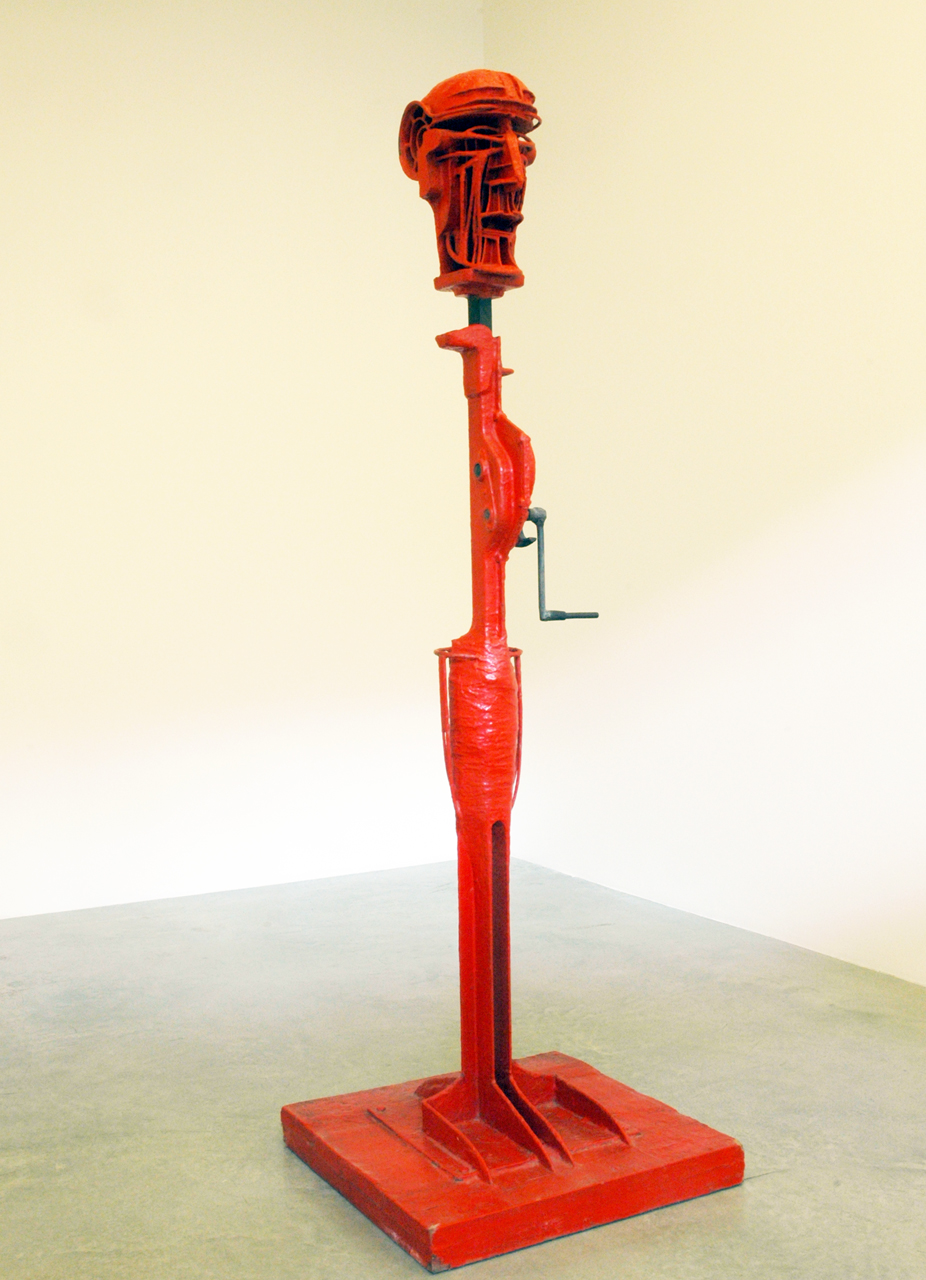
Just keep rotating (1967)

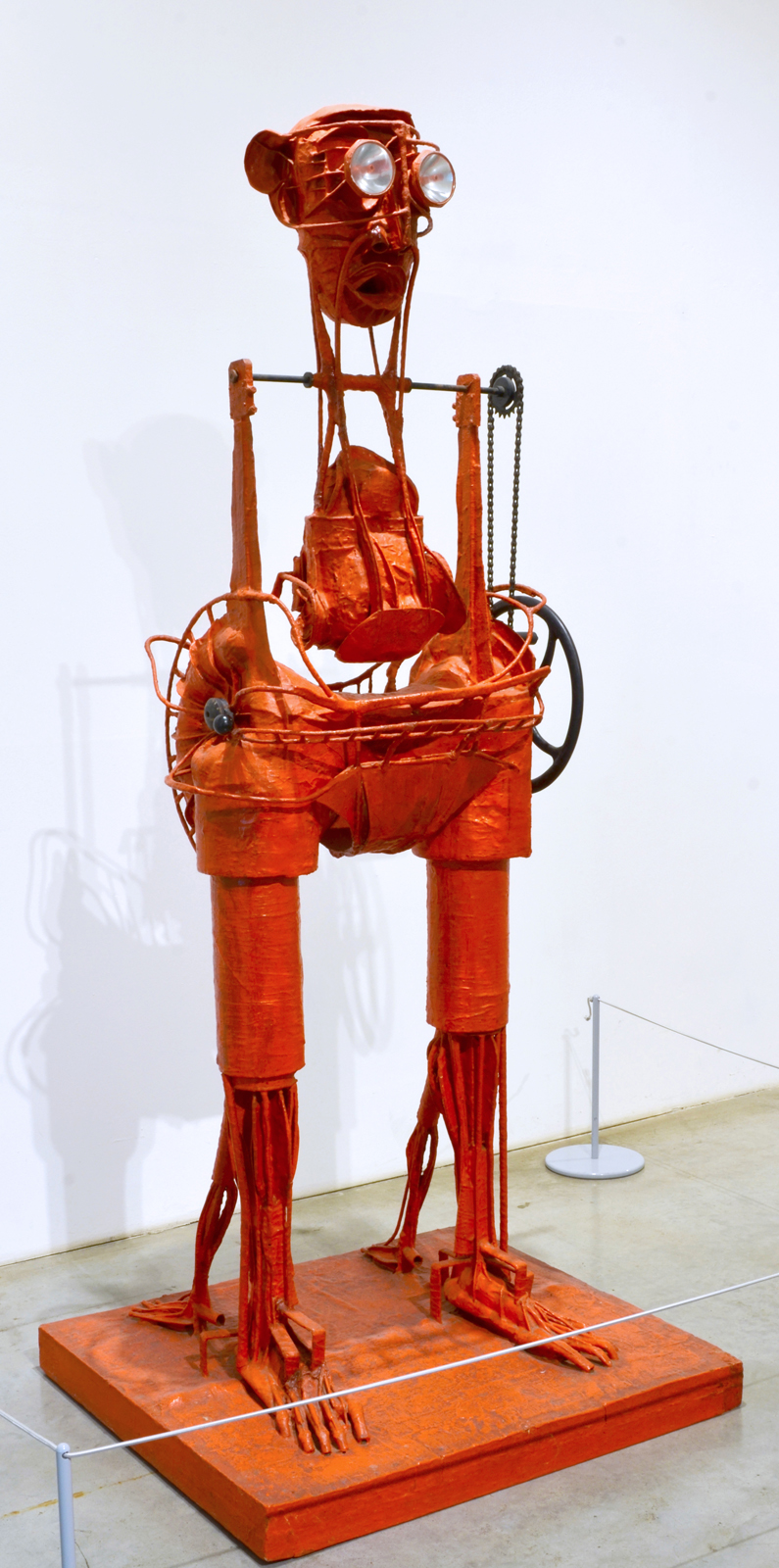
Just keep rotating (1967–1968)

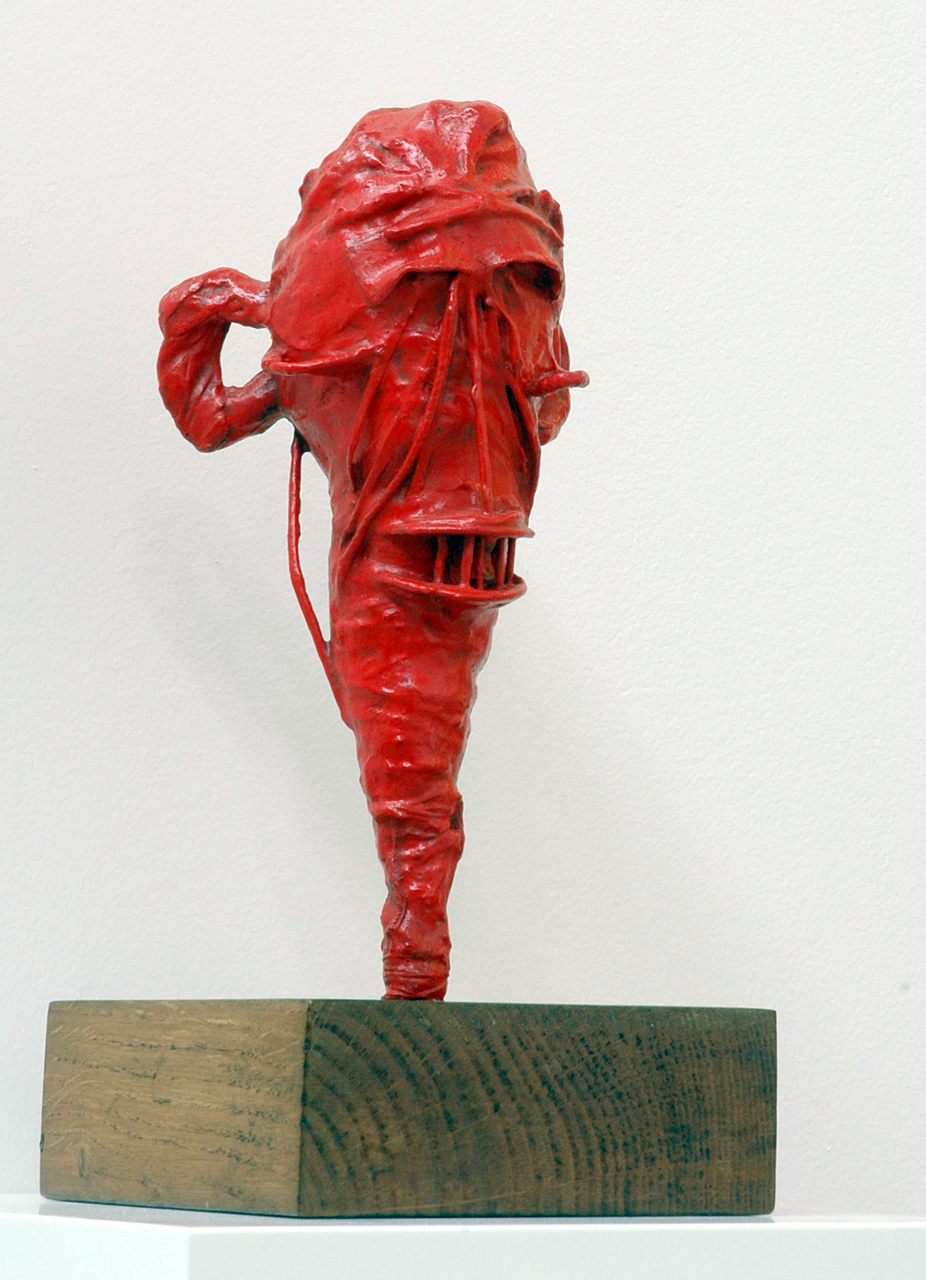
Red Head (1970s)

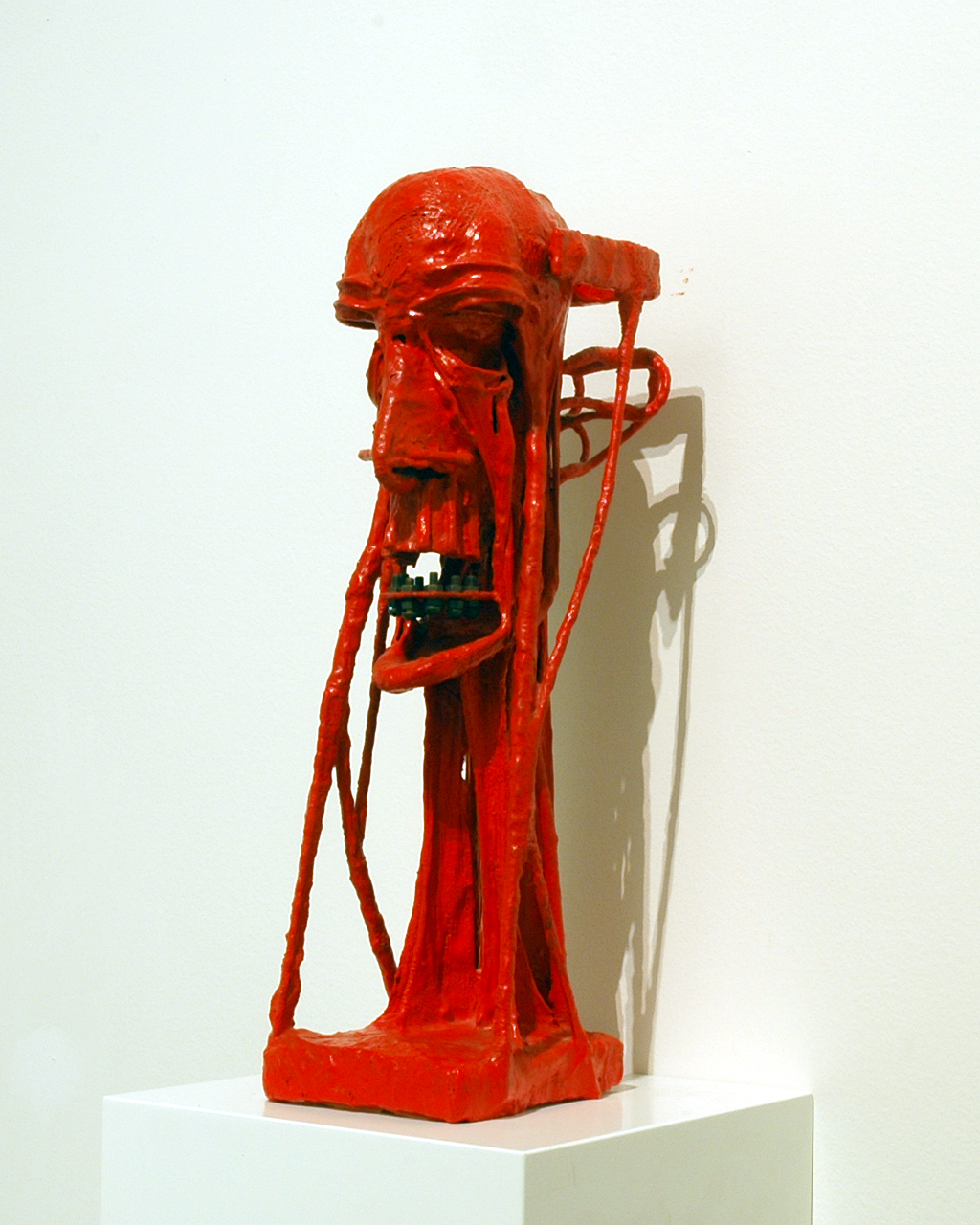
Red Head (1975)

Karel Nepraš practised the technique of modelling and casting cast iron at the Spatial forms sculpture symposium in Ostrava in 1969, where he created his key work Family Ready to Leave. Cranks, gears and chains became an integral part of Nepraš's sculptures. He has since used cast iron in its raw form as a basic element of his heads, figures, and assemblages with moving gears (Bigger Rebukes Smaller 1969–1970) created through the mid-1970s.

The increasing political oppression after the Soviet occupation of Czechoslovakia also inspired two cast-iron sculptures conceived as presses: Figures with Filling I and II (1969–1970) or red cast-iron sculptures of figures joined tightly together ('Crowd, 1969-1970). The reinforcements and ribs of the cast-iron casts have their antecedents in Nepraš's drawings. In 1972, he created the sculptural installation The Assault on the Rabbit Hutch as an undisguisedly stark monument to the times, thematizing the dysfunction, horror and irony of the situation, with mechanized dehumanized busts of a manipulated man. The work was purchased at the time by the well-known Milanese gallerist Arturo Schwarz.

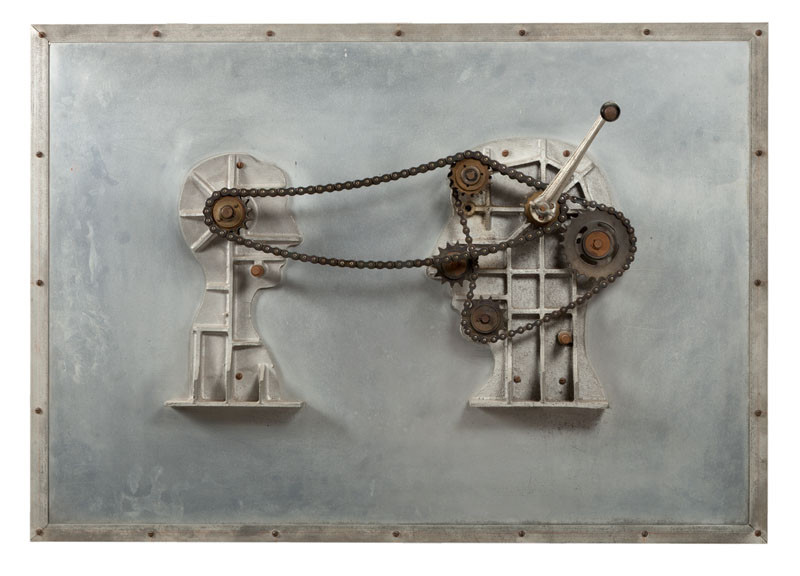
'Bigger Rebukes Smaller (1969-1970), Nátional Gallery Prague

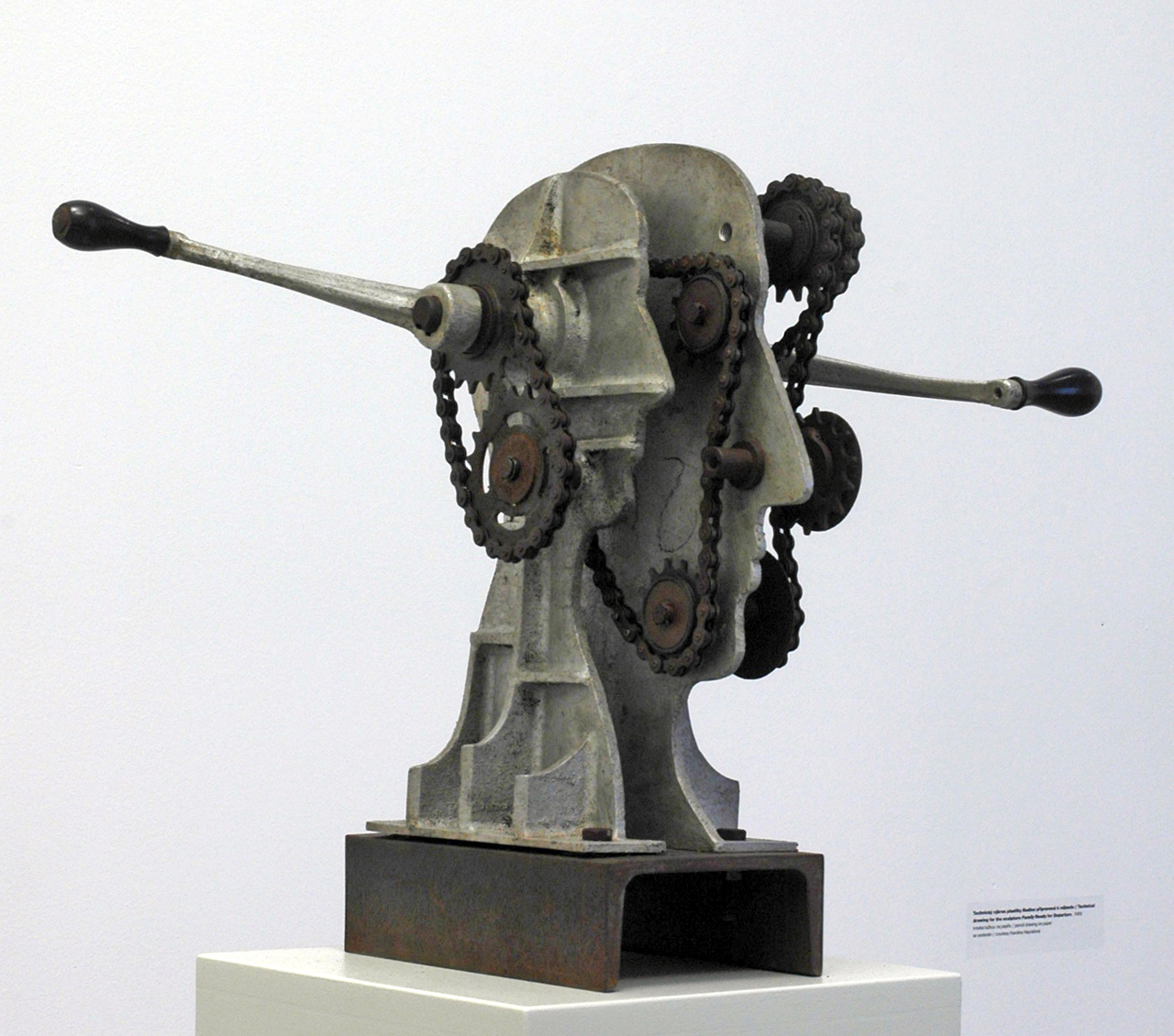
Untitled (1970s)

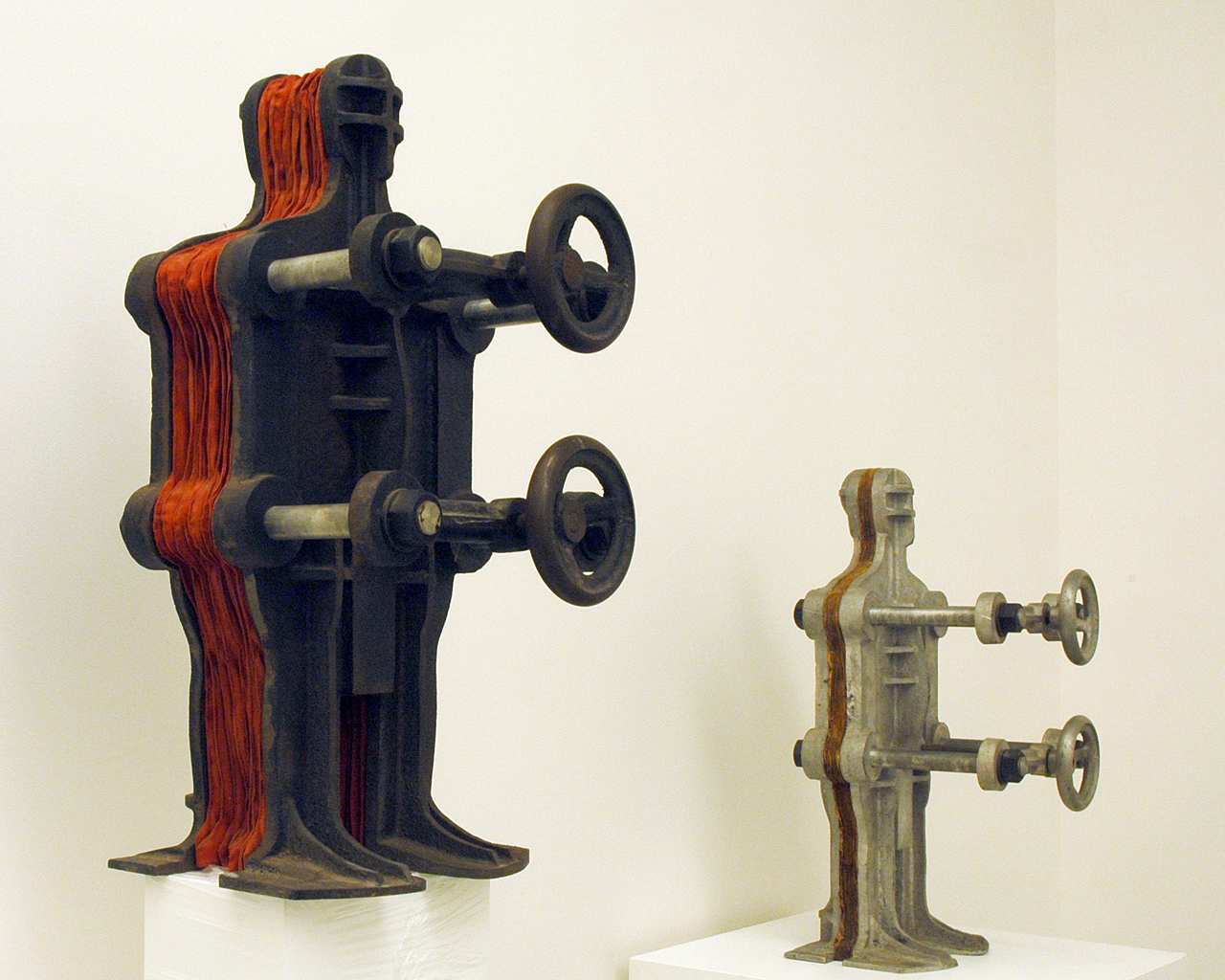
Figures with Filling I and II (1969-1970)

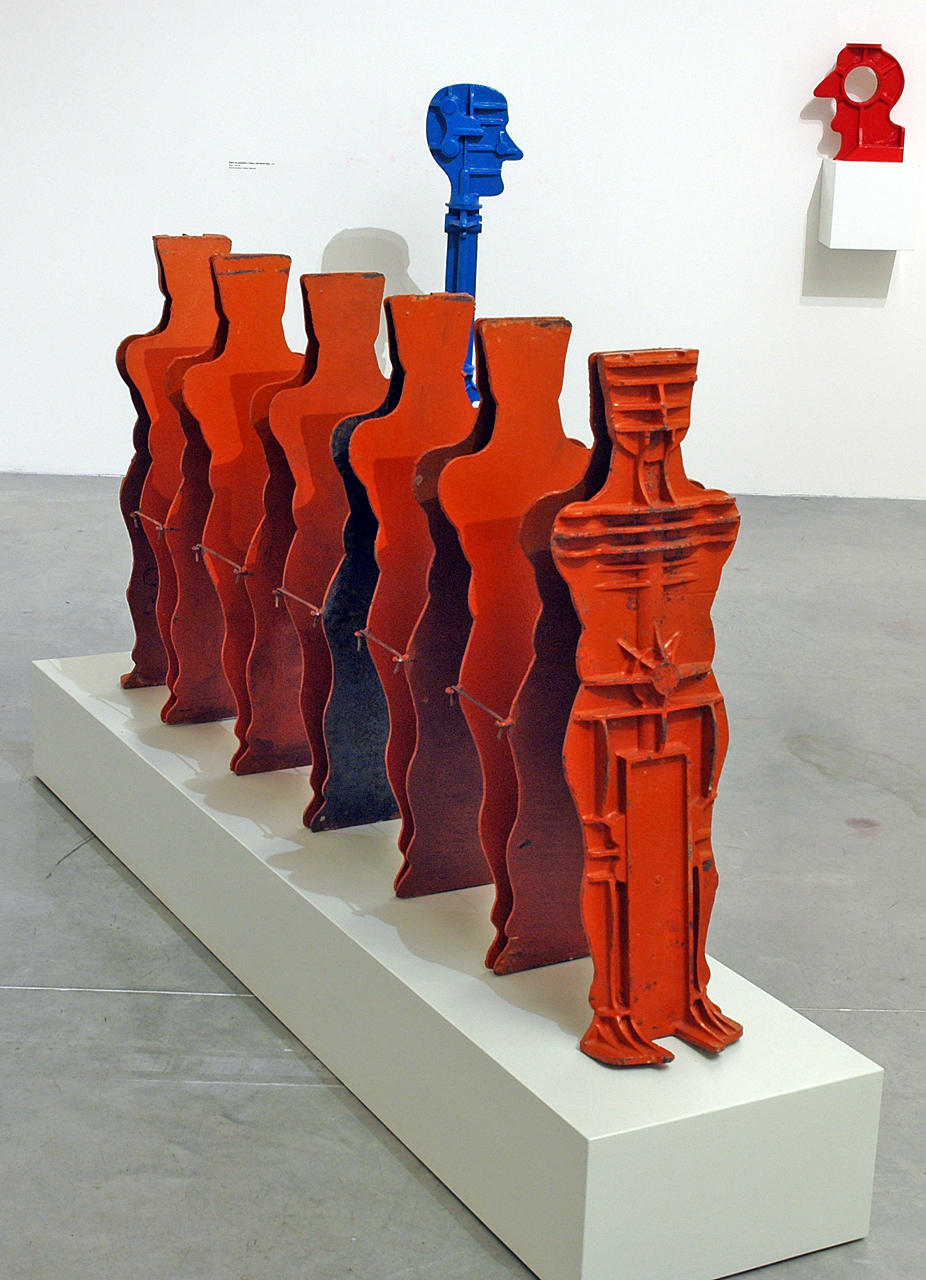
Crowd (1969-1970)

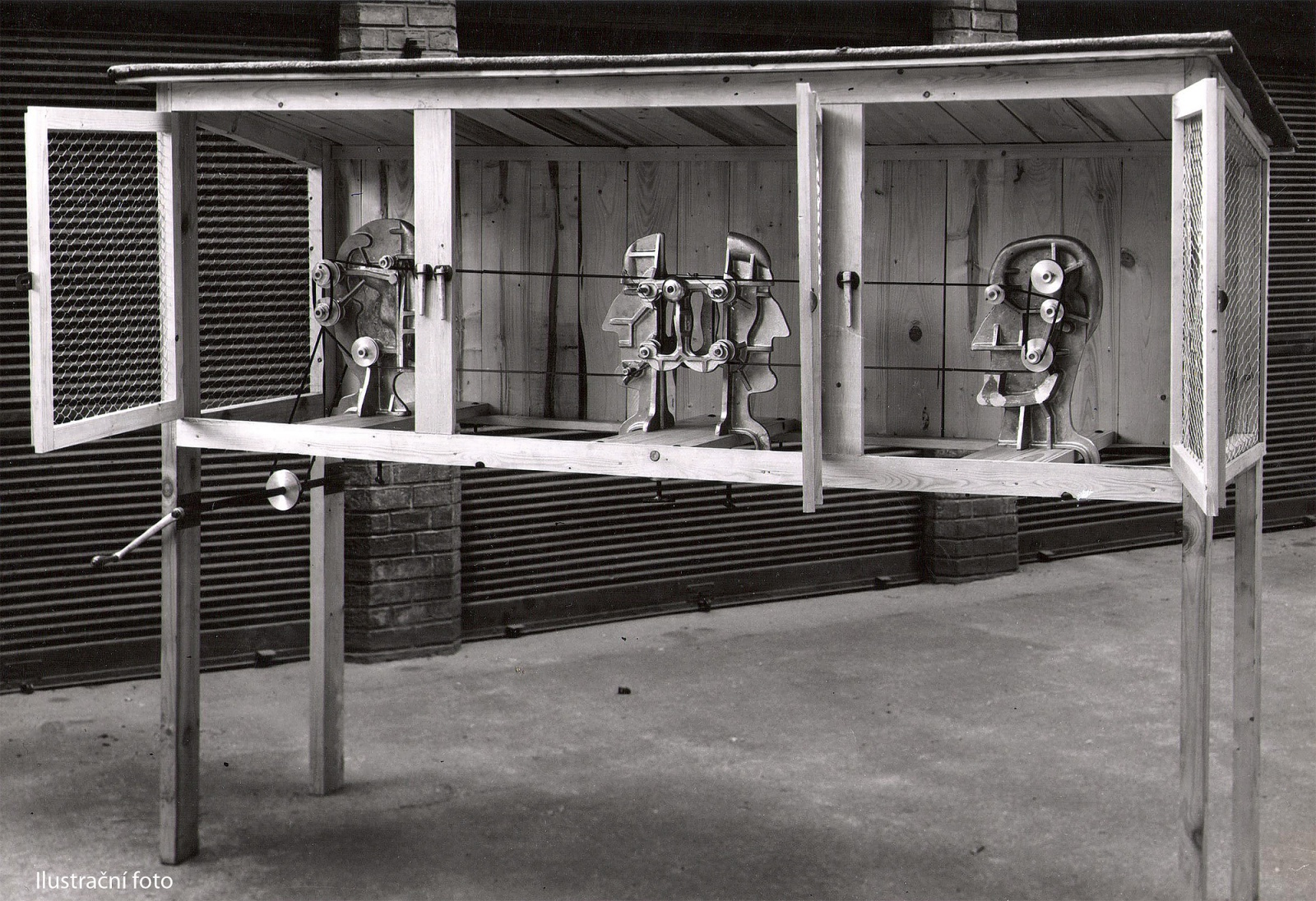
The Assault on the Rabbit Hutch (1972)

Figures assembled from mechanisms and technical components are automata in which only their anthropometry is related to humans. But one can find in them a subtle humour in the details, and an absurd humour in the possible but meaningless applicability. Nepraš's humour attacks the intellect and releases tension. At the same time, the sculptor's conception of man as a mechanism without individuality is weakened by the artistic means used. The contrast between the drastic motif and its artistic travesty is strongly appealing. It excludes the tragedy and pathos of extreme situations and, as a bitter comedy, is closer to reality, which also mixes different genres. It finds its starting point in self-reflection and critical reckoning, which includes a methodical disregard for the self.

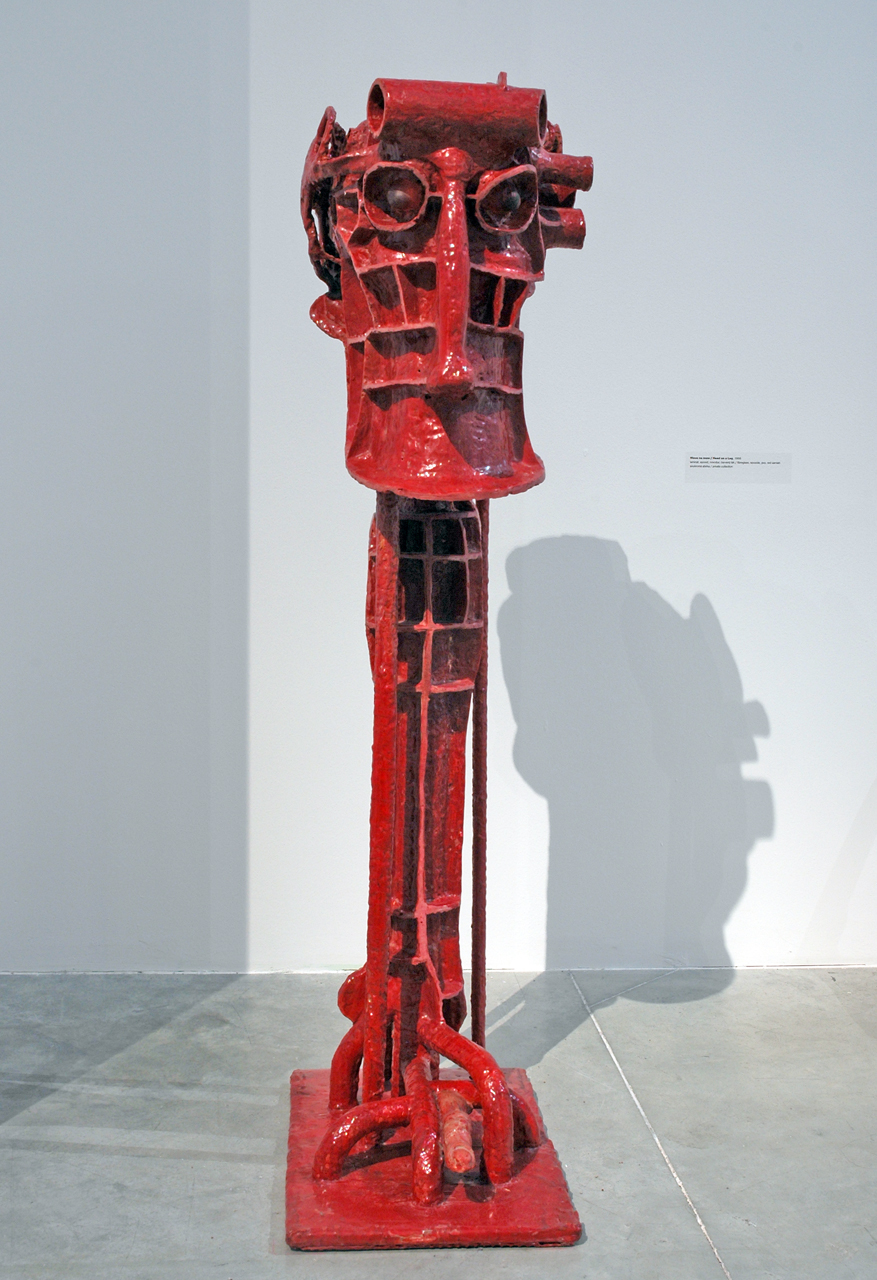
Head on foot (1966)

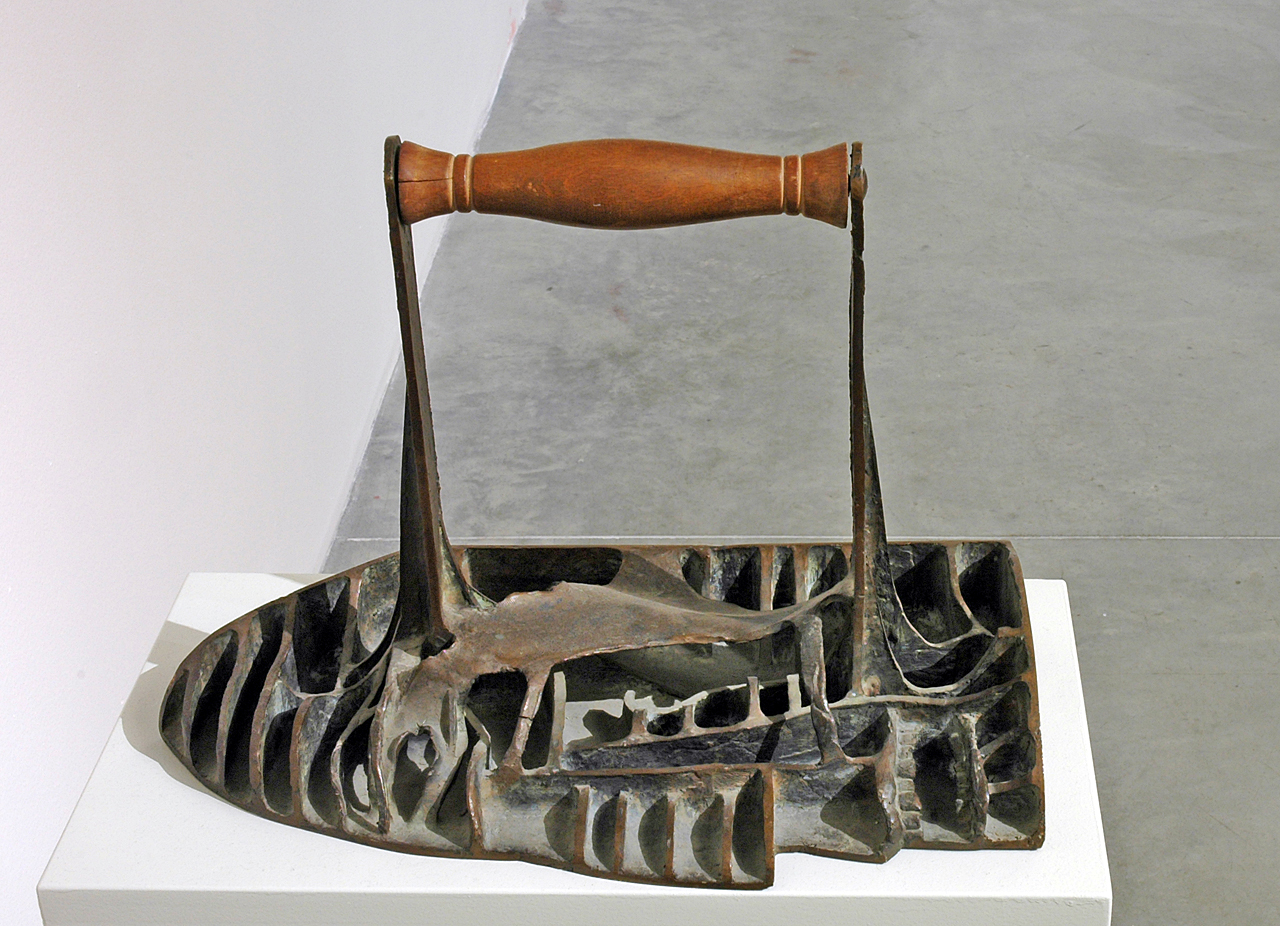
Iron - face (1968)

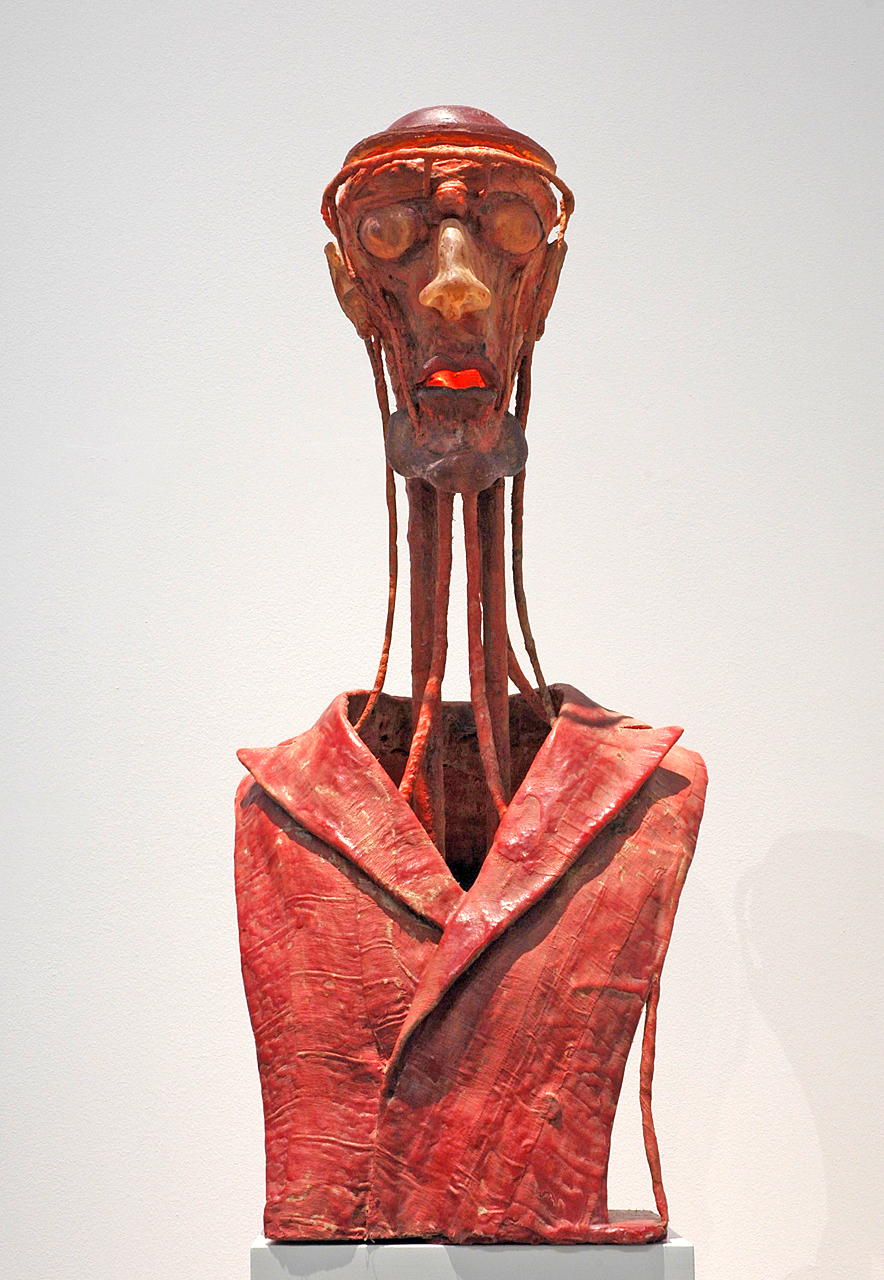
Bust (1969)

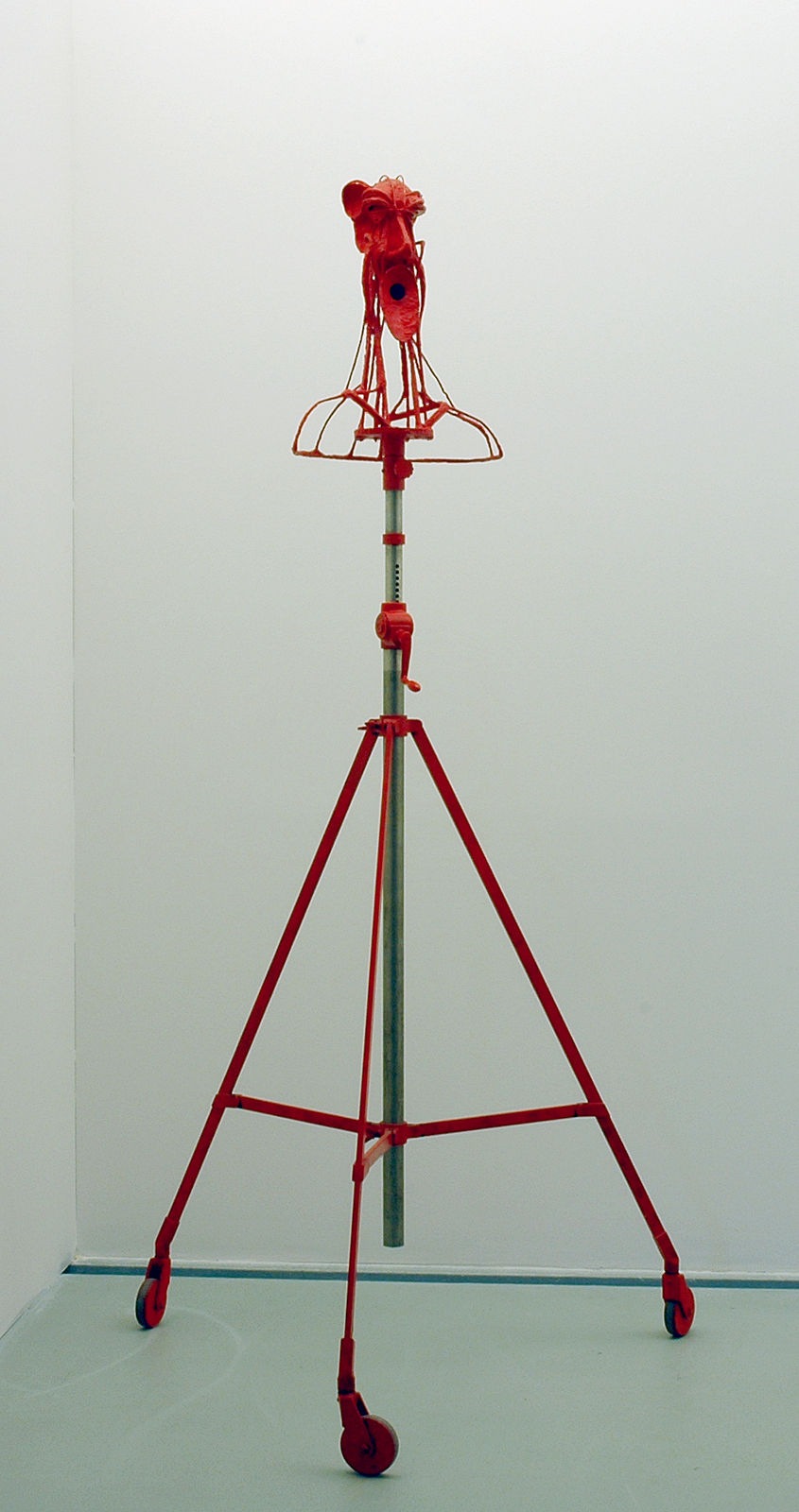
Head - watch tower (1970–1971)

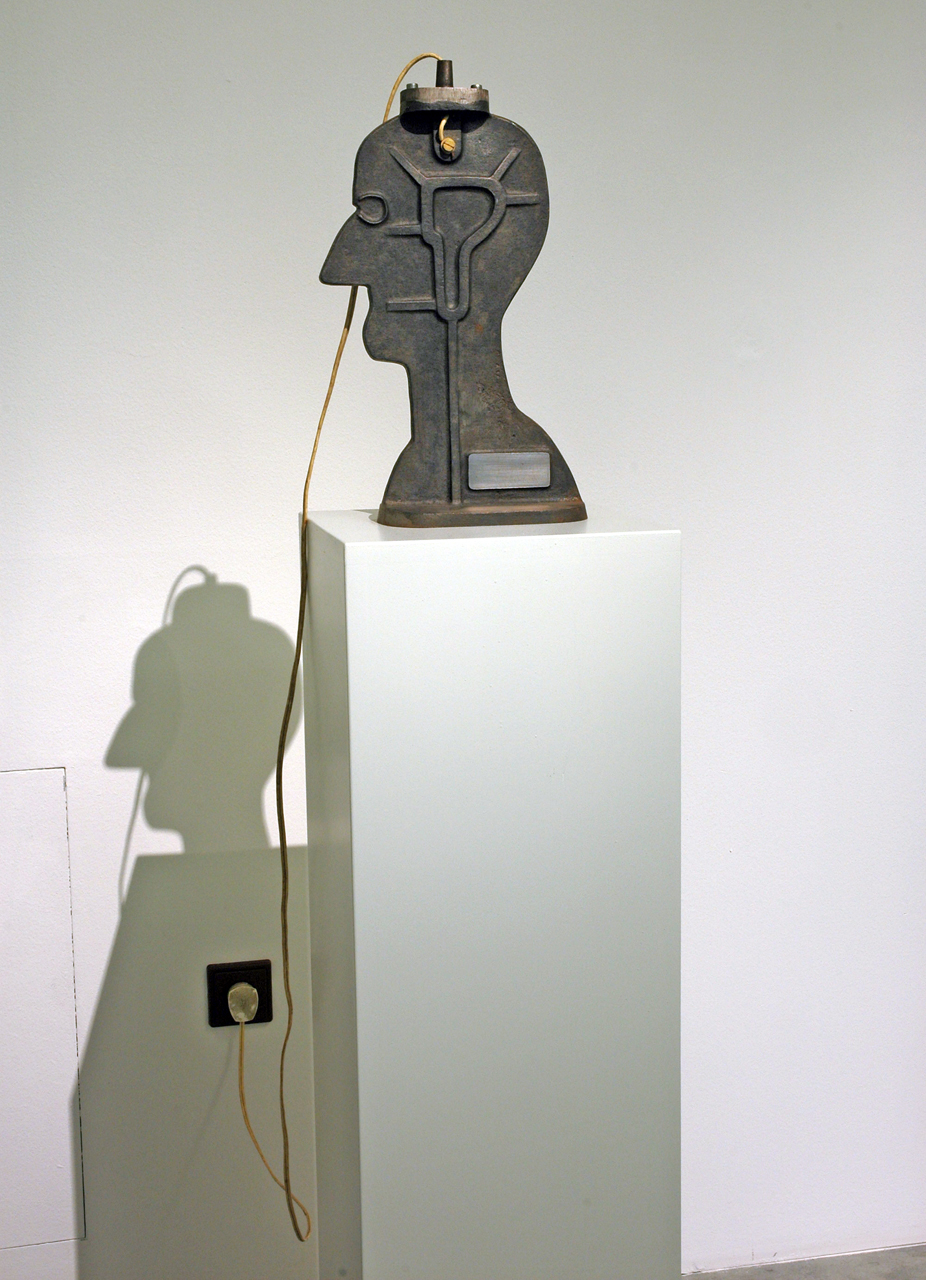
Suicide attempt (1976–1977)

=== Metal sculptures and assemblages (1970s–1990s) ===
The sculptor later increasingly used prefabricated cast iron elements, pipes, screws, wheels and plumbing fittings to assemble objects (Figural Sculpture with Screw, 1972, National Gallery in Prague, An Attempt at Self-Portrait) or combines cast iron casts with tools (variations on the theme Harvest, 1993/94), with stoneware, plumbing fittings and various banal objects such as Head-fountains or Portraits. In the late 1980s, Nepraš returned to the beginnings of his sculptural work, but the materials he used and the technique of joining them had changed. In addition to pipes, which only pretend to be functional, he used other plumbing materials and fittings. For his exhibition in the unofficial gallery at Opatov, he created a set of relief portraits in which, by carefully selecting the materials used, he attempted to characterize a few selected people from his surroundings (Portrait of S.S, 1989).

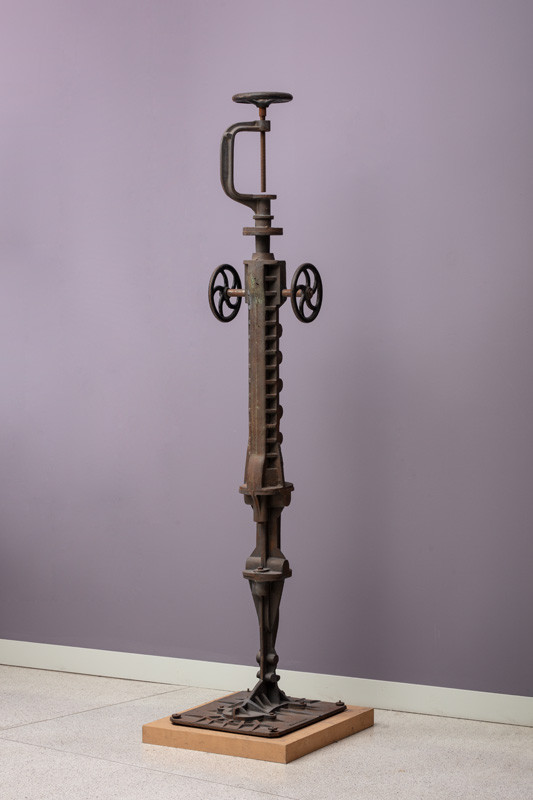
Figural Sculpture with Screw (1972), National Gallery Prague

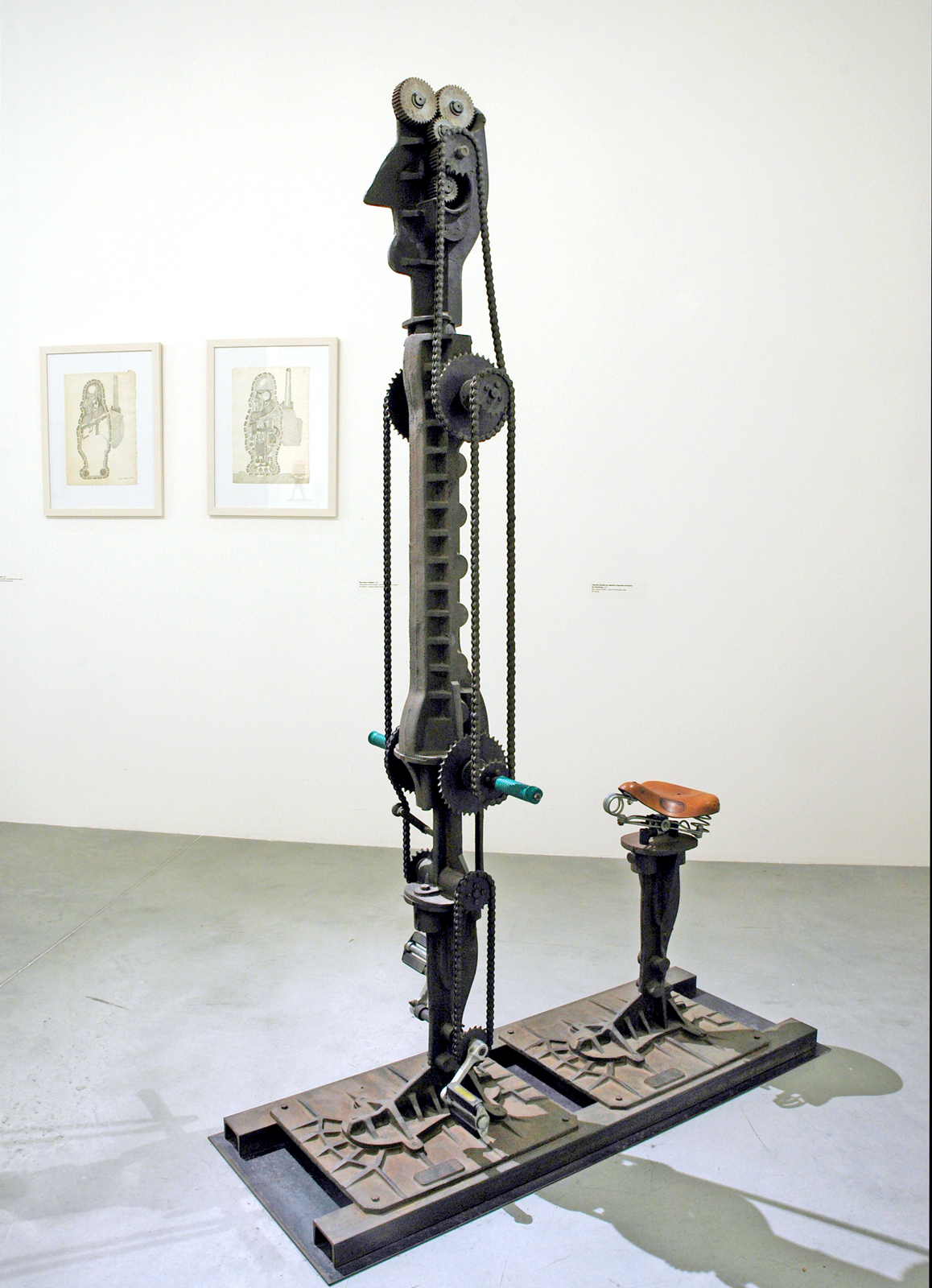
Figural sculpture for pedalling (1972)

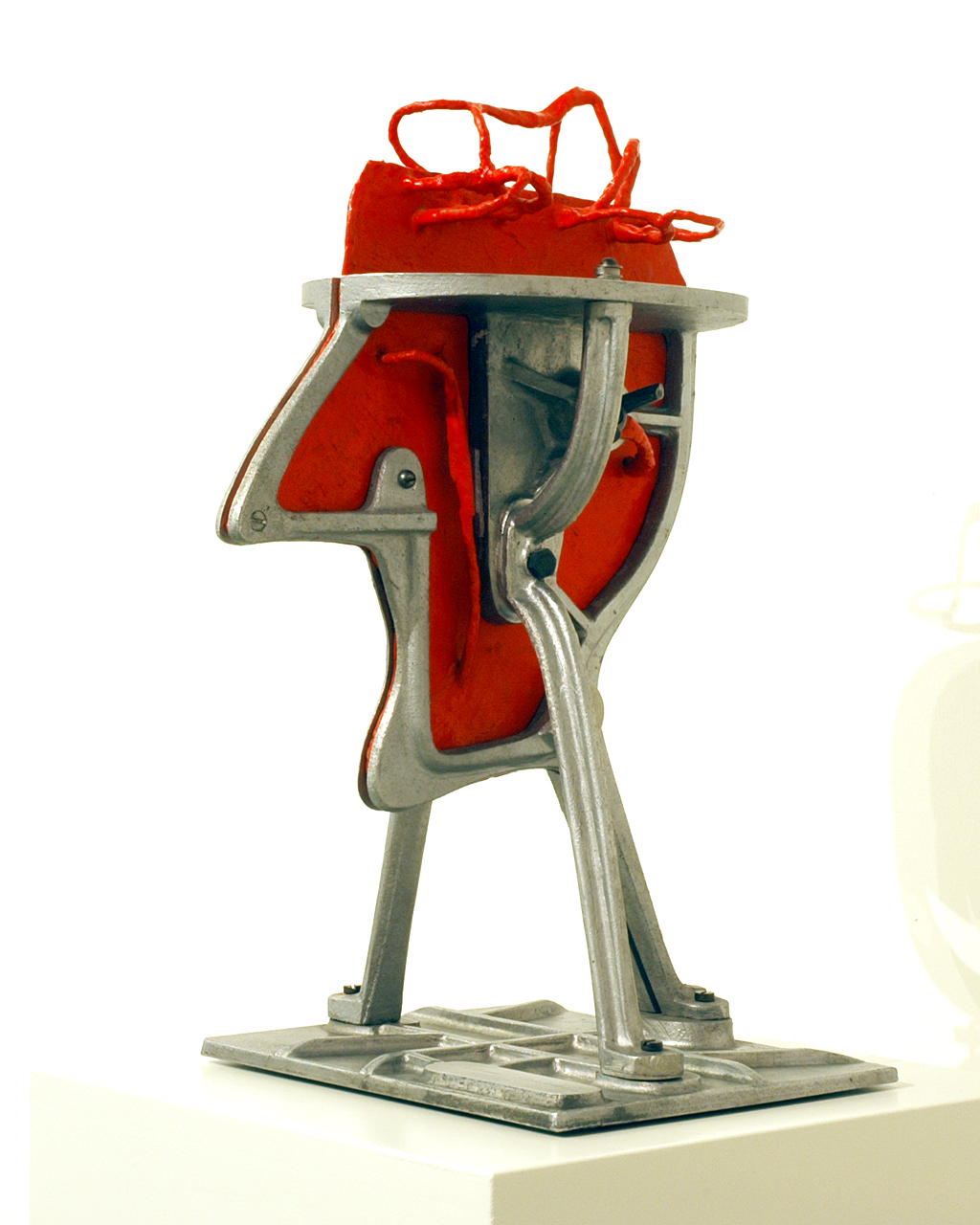
Head with red filling (1975)

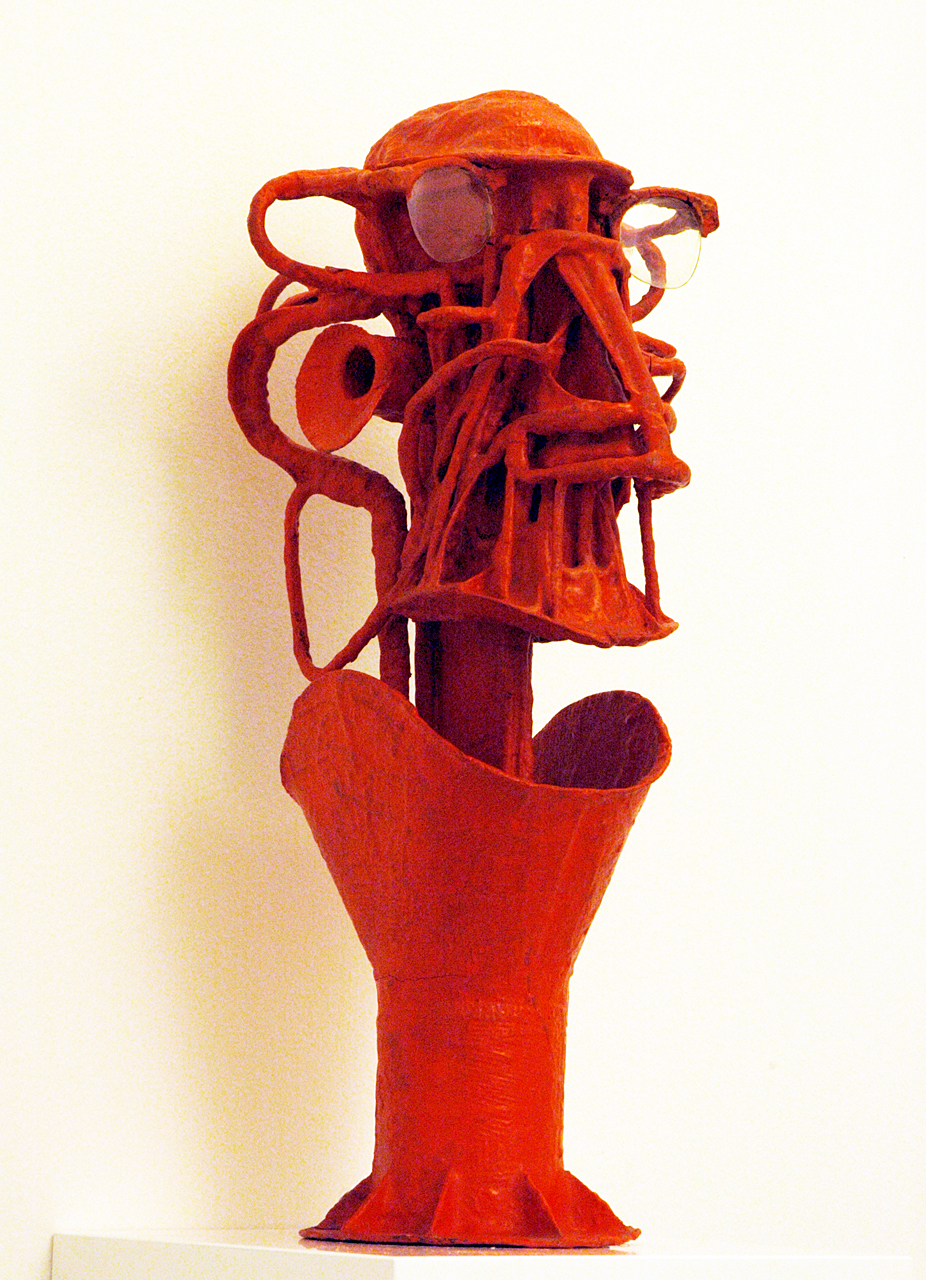
Head (1977)

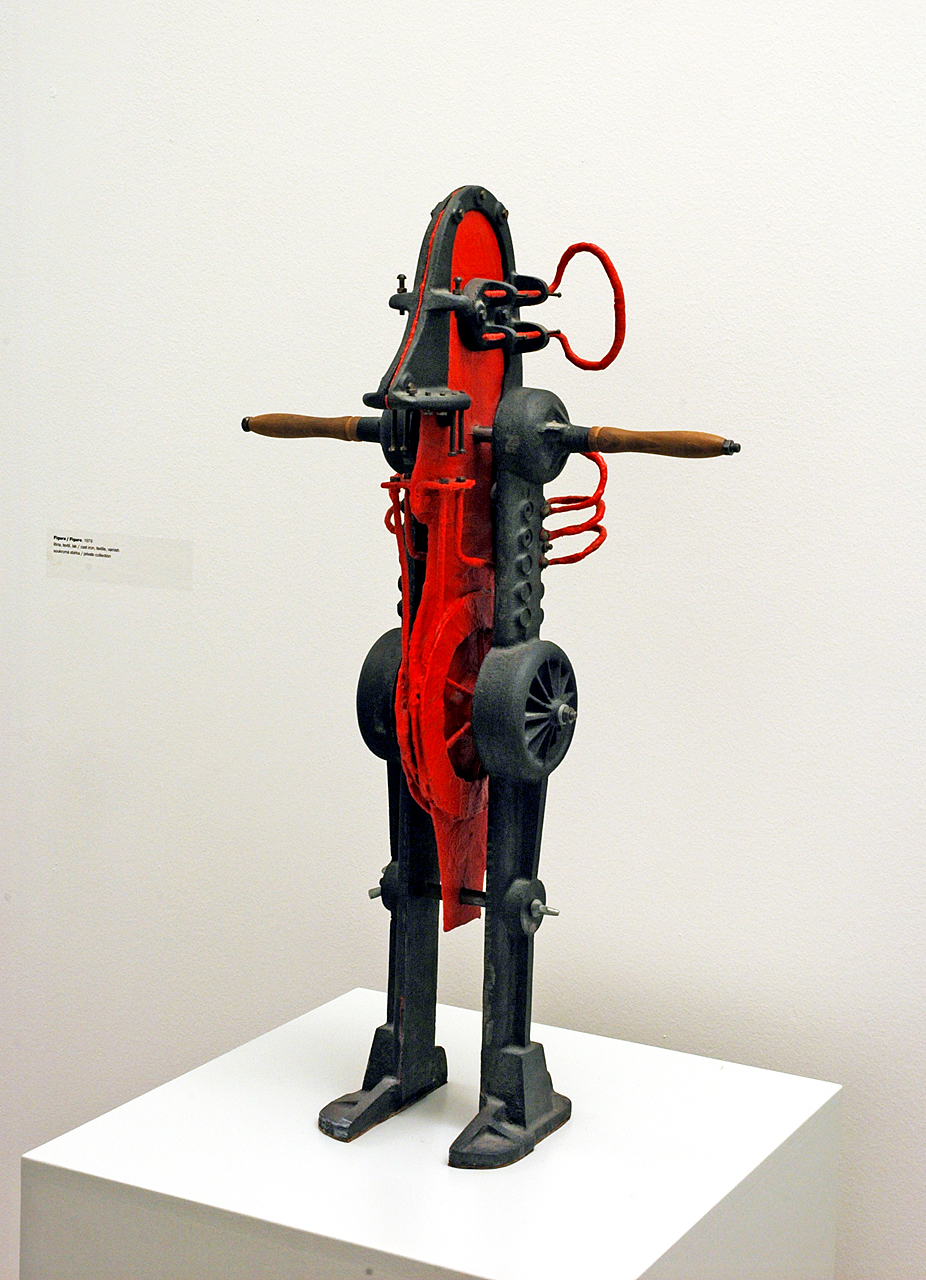
Figure (1979)

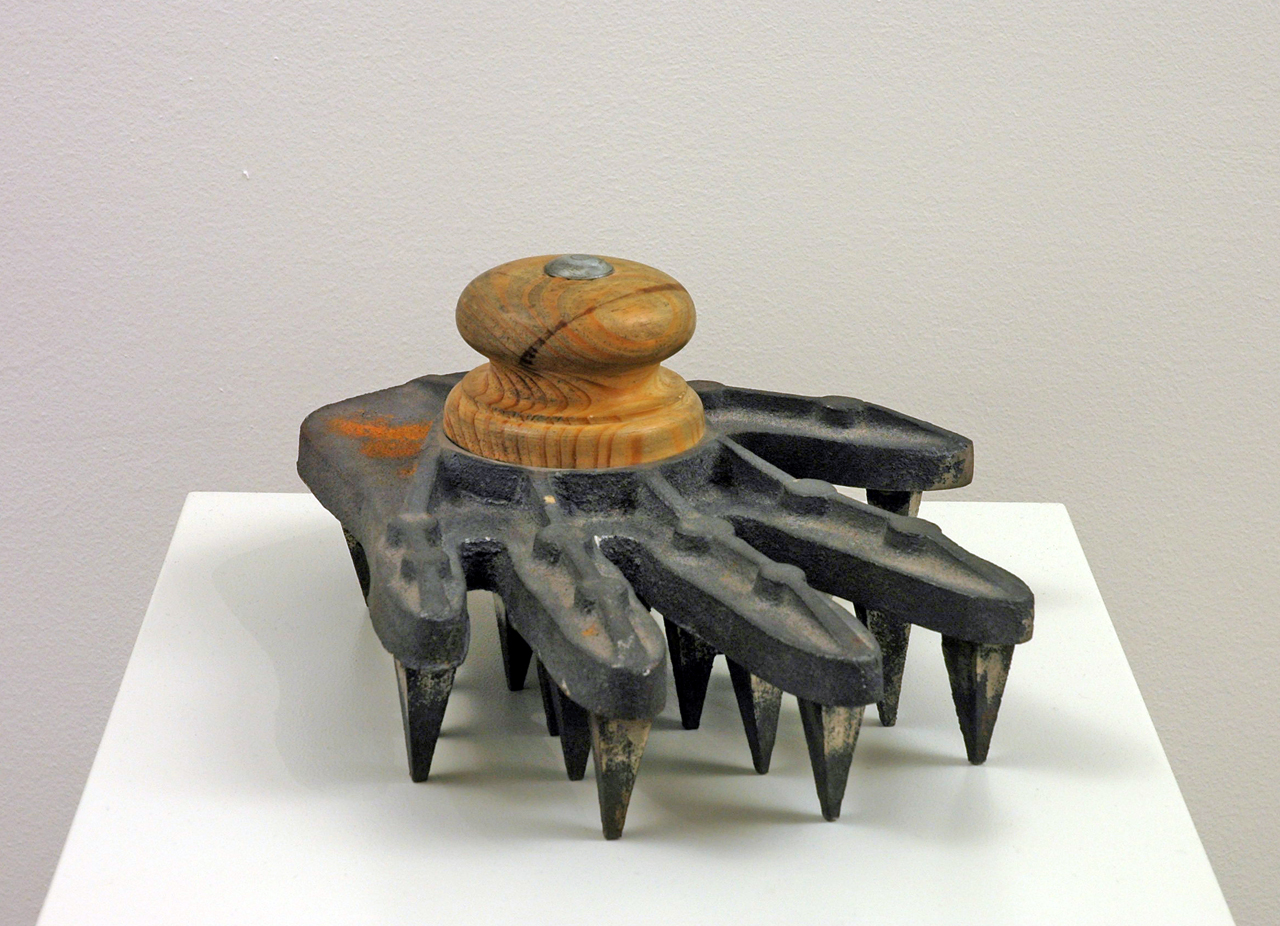
Big slap (1980s)

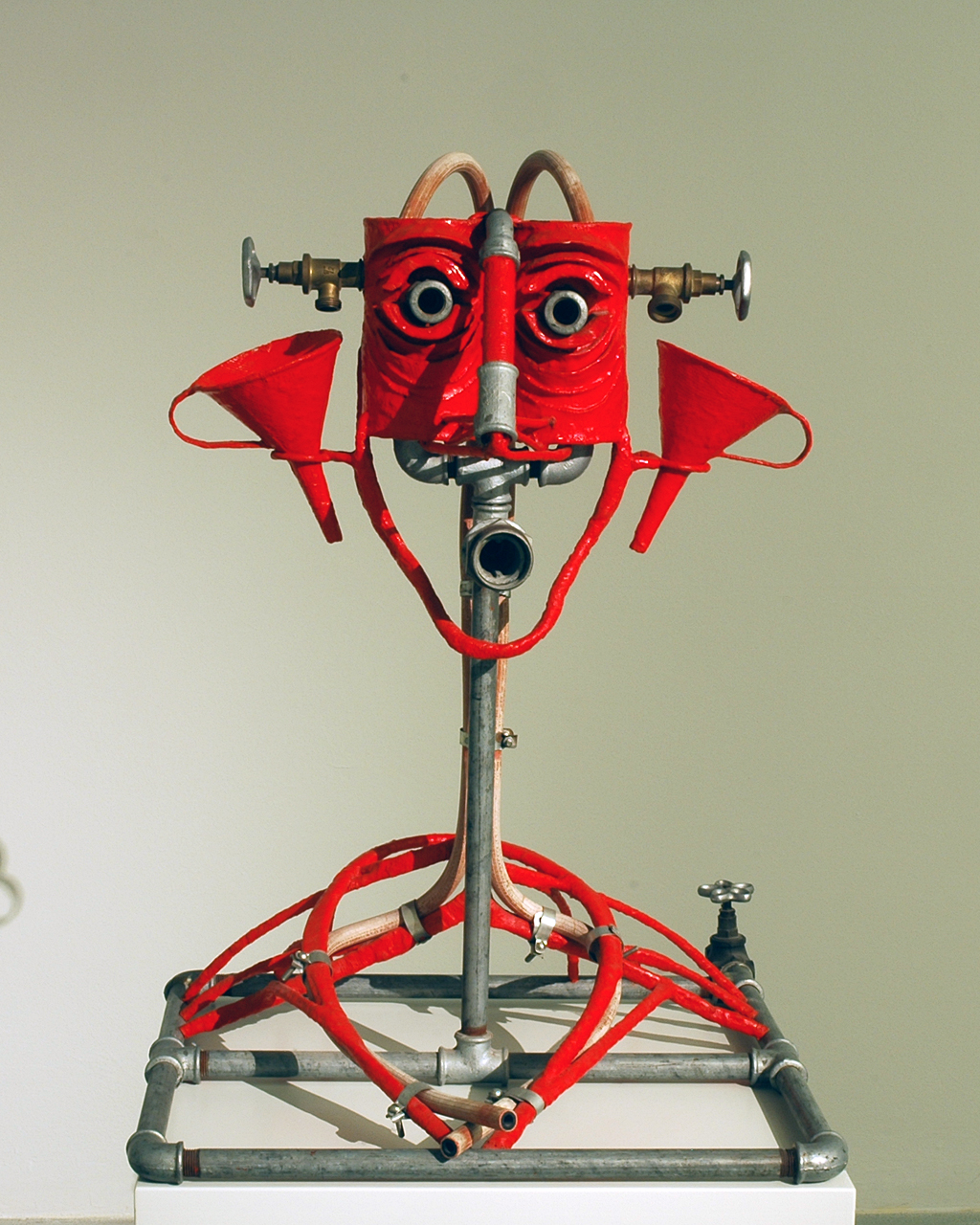
Head - fountain IV (1983)

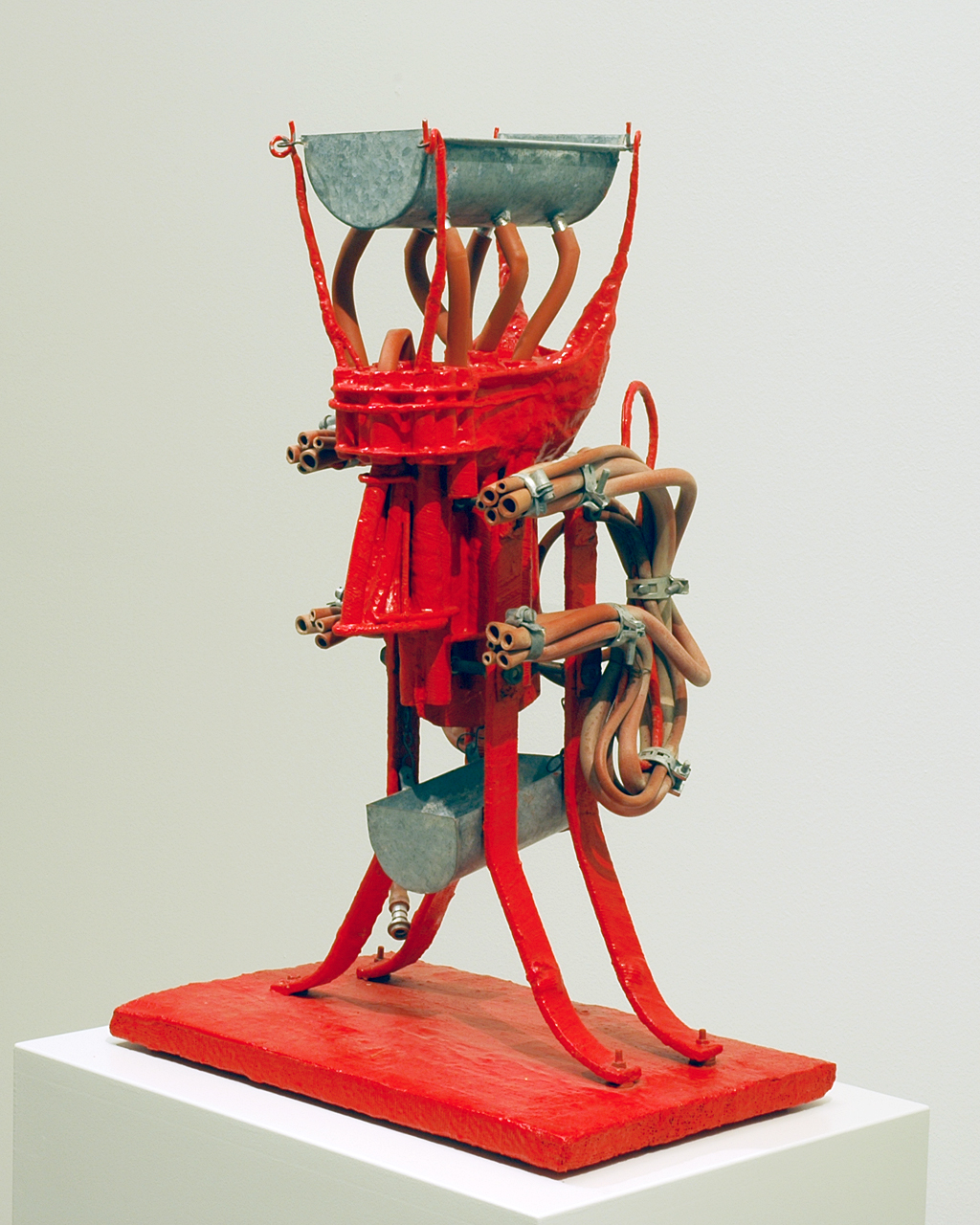
Head - fountain V (1985)

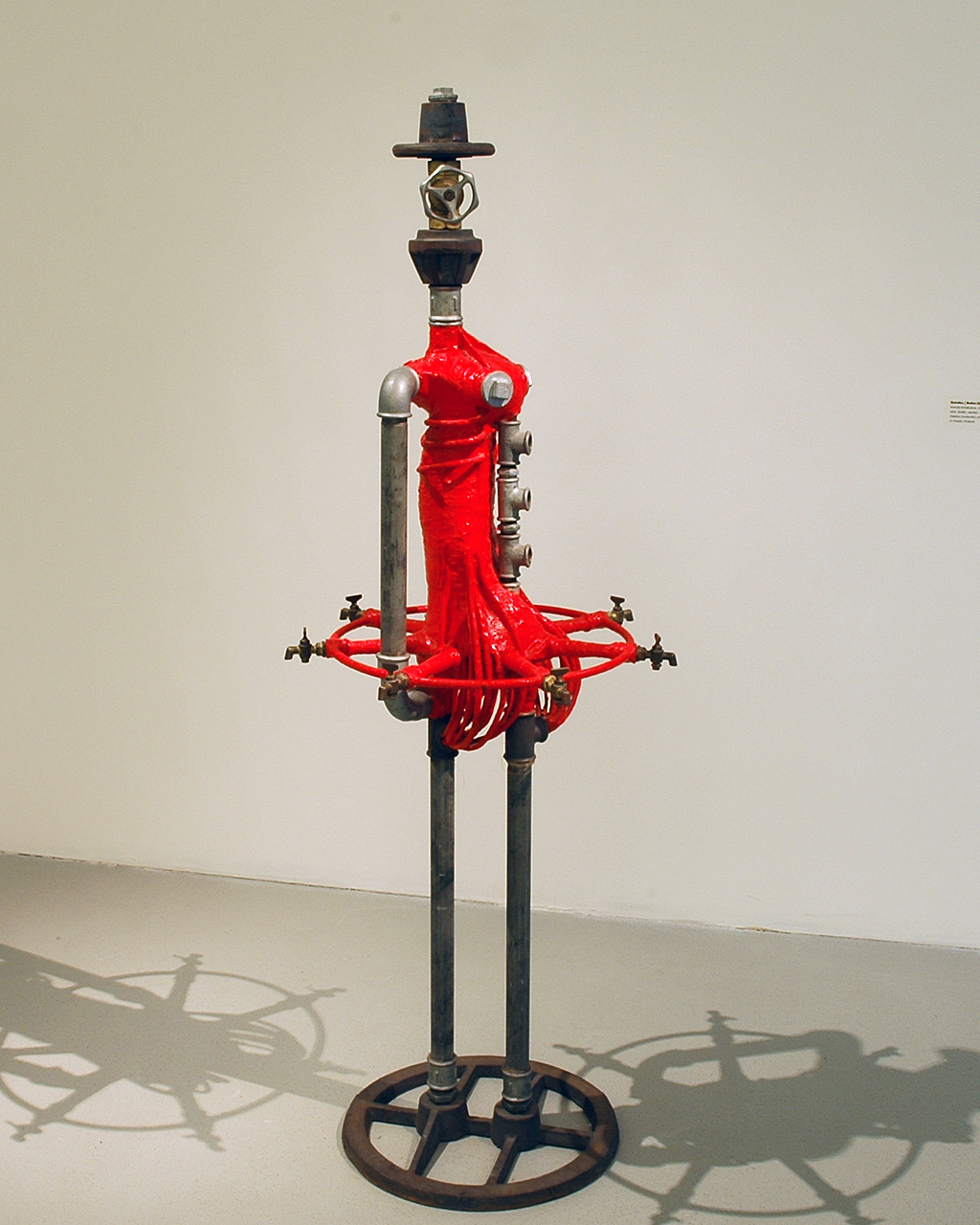
Ballerina (1987)

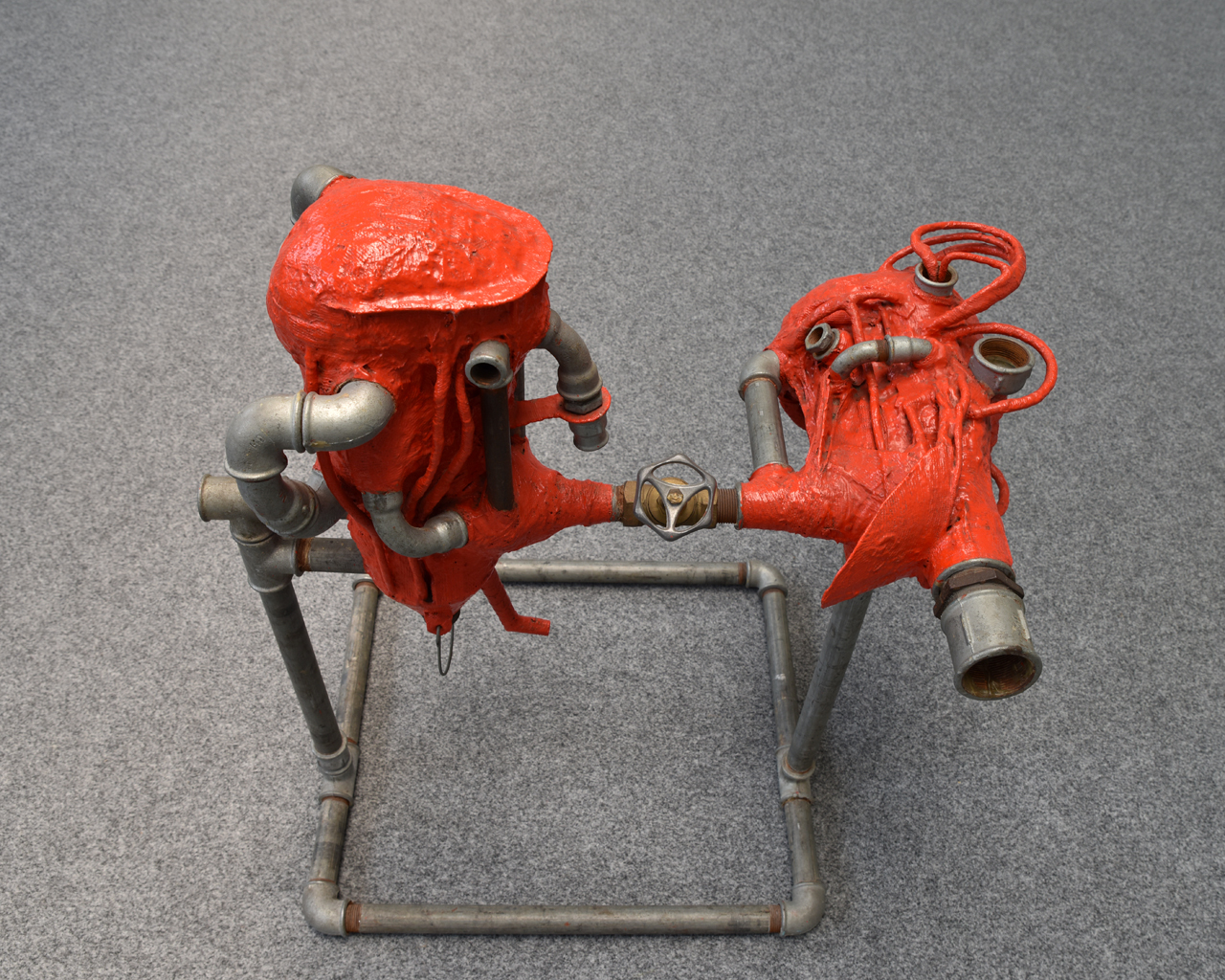
The Kiss (1987), Regional Gallery of Art, Karlovy Vary

The theme of dialogue, which in fact reflects the impossibility of dialogue, accompanies Nepraš's work until the end of the 1980s. One of the last variants is two black heads on shovel handles, drowned in black washtub, which could serve as illustrations of the absurdist plays by Samuel Beckett (Dialogue VI, 1989). At the same time, he assembles individual sculptures into new contexts of meaning (variants of Snow White and the Seven Dwarfs, 1988–1991), or creates conceptual environments (The Lament Wall, 1990, Bath for MV). In 1990, he participated in the International Sculpture Symposium at Lemberk Castle and created a spatial installation made of pipes and cast iron tubes resembling a giant animal skeleton.

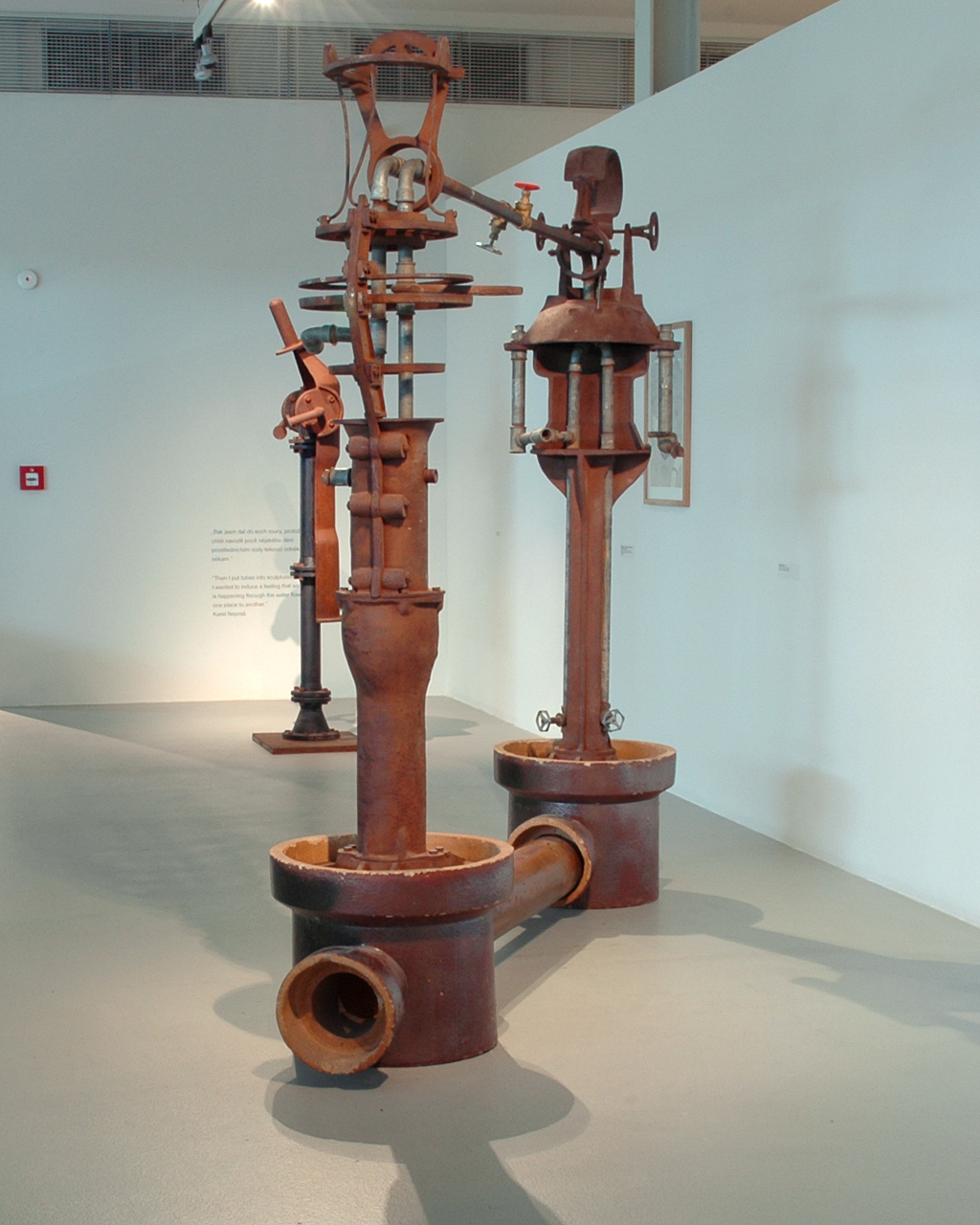
Dialogue V (1981)

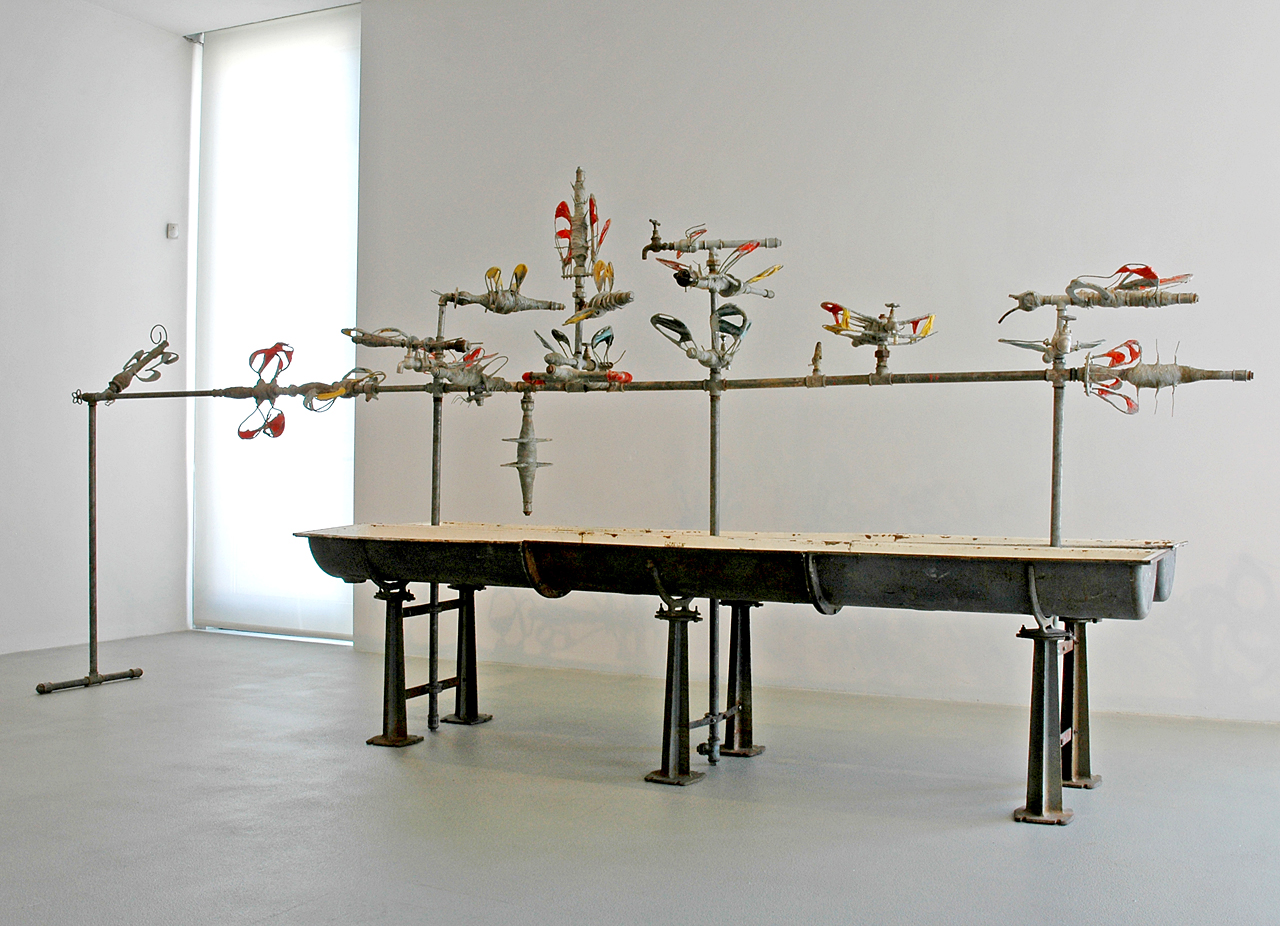
Bath for M.V. or S.S. (1988)

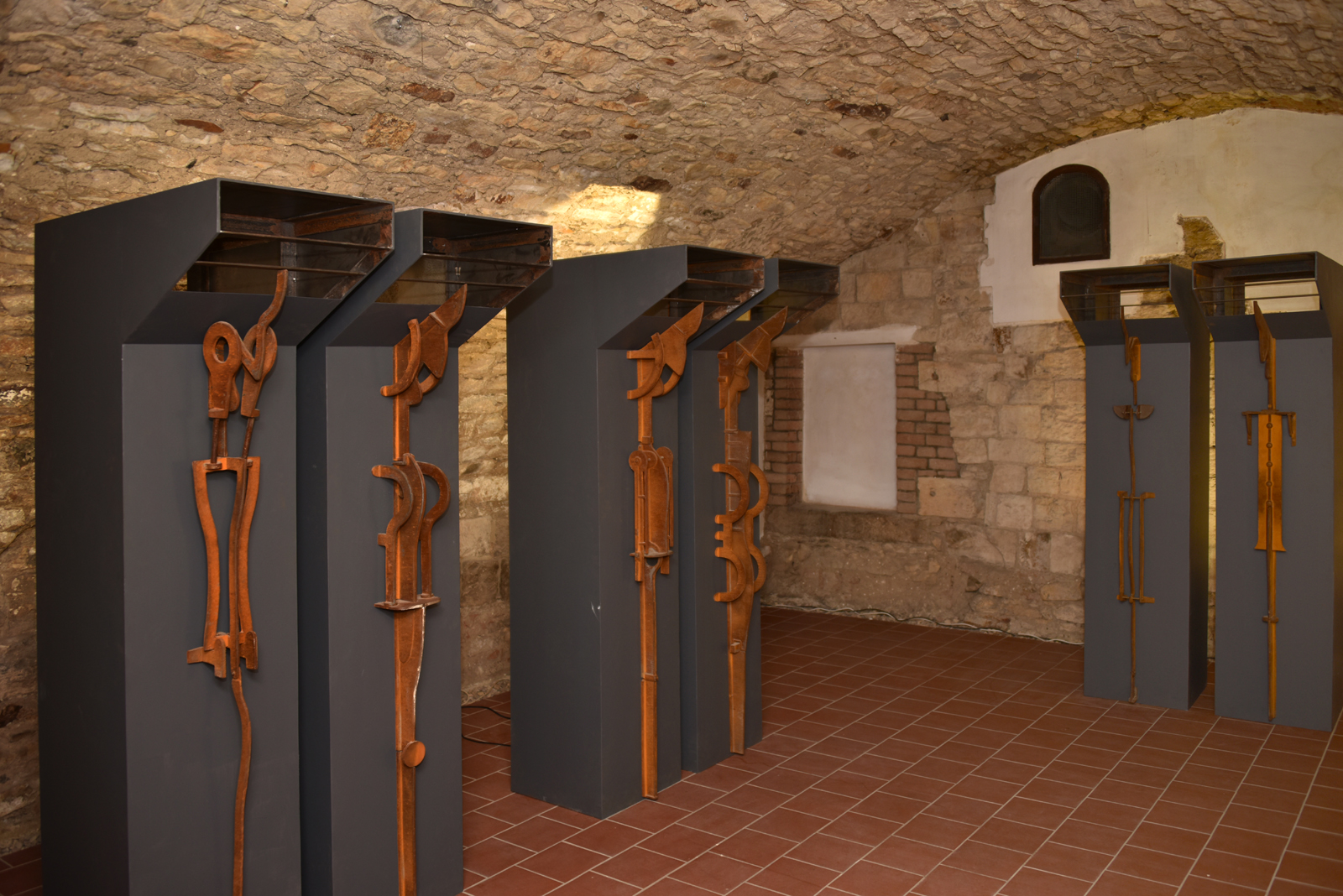
The Lament Wall II (1990s)

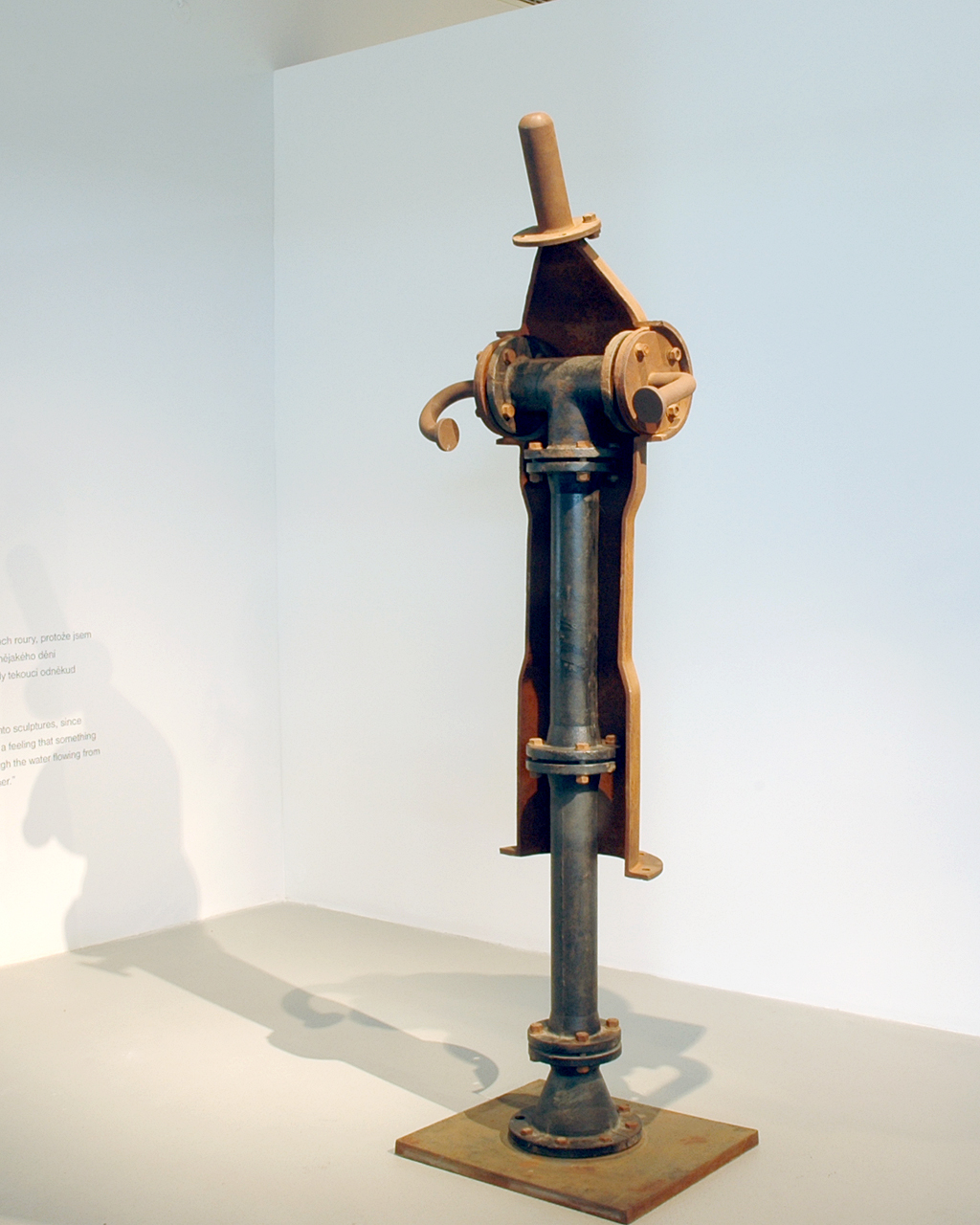
Dancer (1990s)

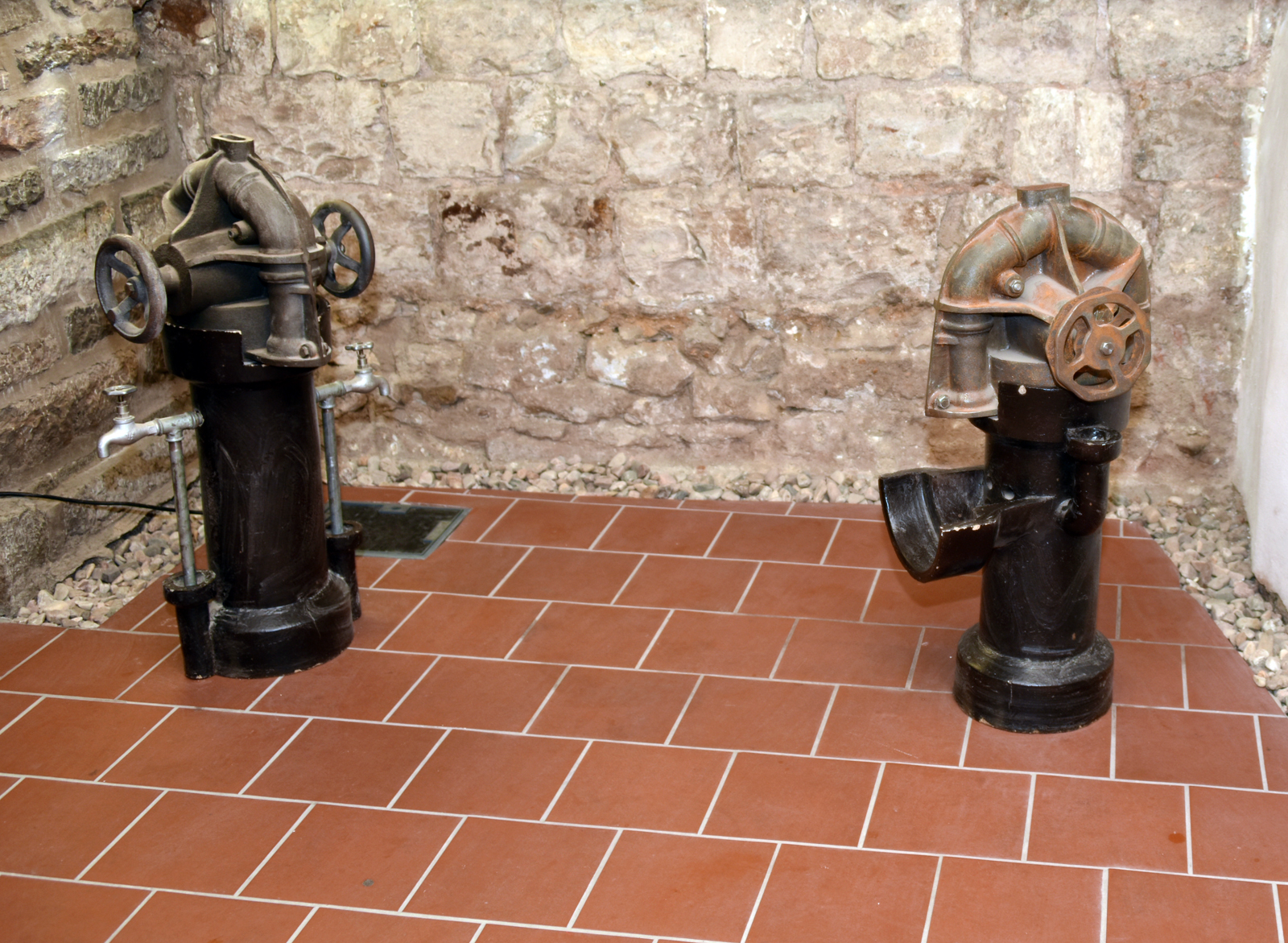
Heads (1990s)

=== Electroporcelain and stoneware ===
The ceramic object Dialogue VIII - lightning rod was created during the symposium Prostor Zlín in 1994. Since the mid-1990s, when Nepraš participated in the international ceramic symposium Light, Shadow and Porcelain in Louny, he has been working on a series of sculptures made of porcelain and stoneware. He learned to work with electroporcelain, which he used in smaller relief sculptures (Drying Landscape, 1995, Snow White and the 7 Dwarfs IV, 1995, Manifestation at Temelín, 1995–1996, Thurn-Taxis Ditch, 1995). The reliefs, with many parodic details, are characterized by a relaxed sense of playing out the situations and present a delicate humorous play devoid of black colouring.

In the 1990s, a series of busts was created as assemblages on a porcelain body in the shape of an inverted urinal or washbasin (Porcelain Bust I, 1996, Porcelain Bust II, 1998). After figurative objects-assemblages (Breasts in a Different Way, 1996–1997, Sitting, 1999), he created original variations parodying sanitary ware (the Tender Toilet Bowls series, 1999).

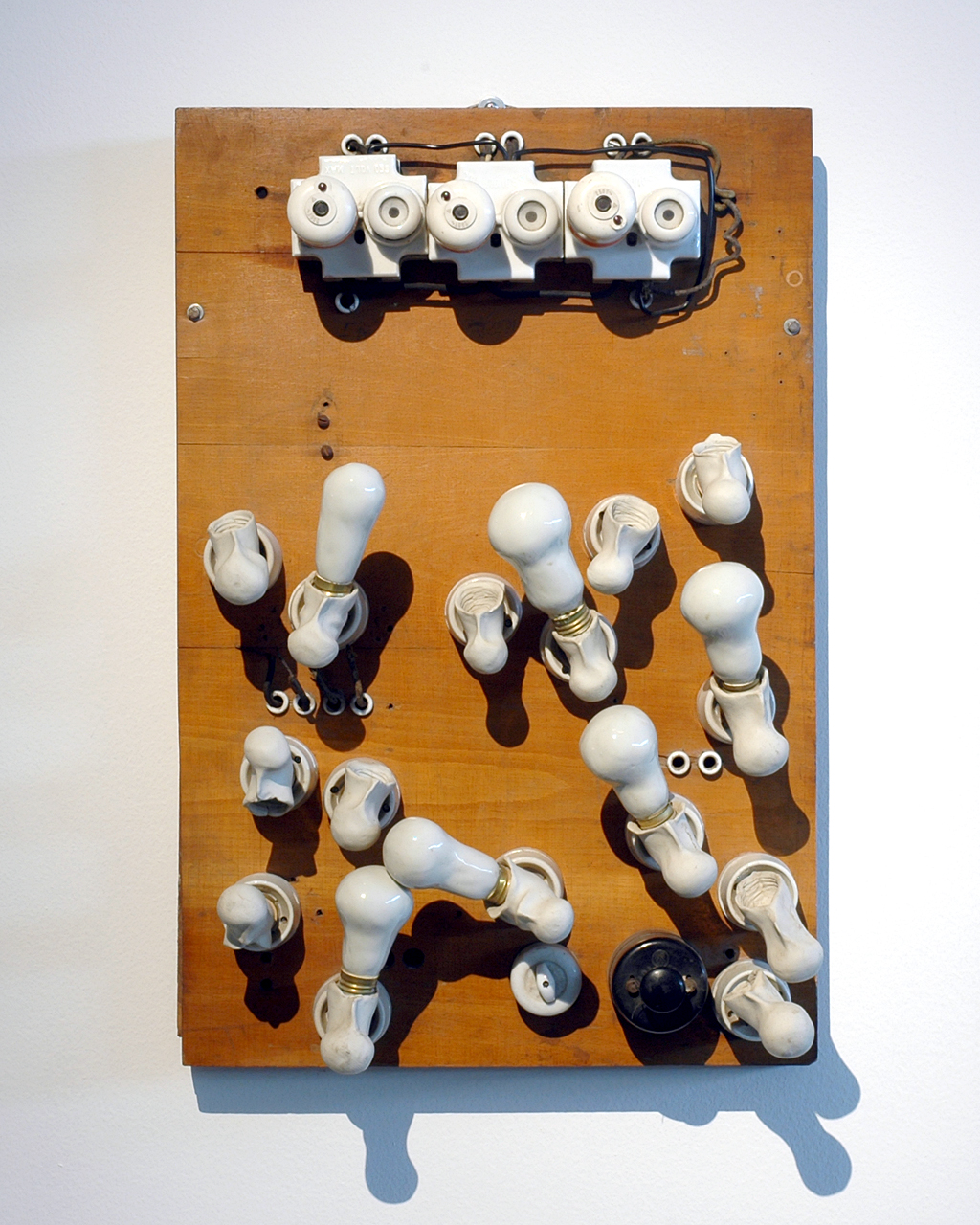
Manifestation at Temelín (1995–1996)

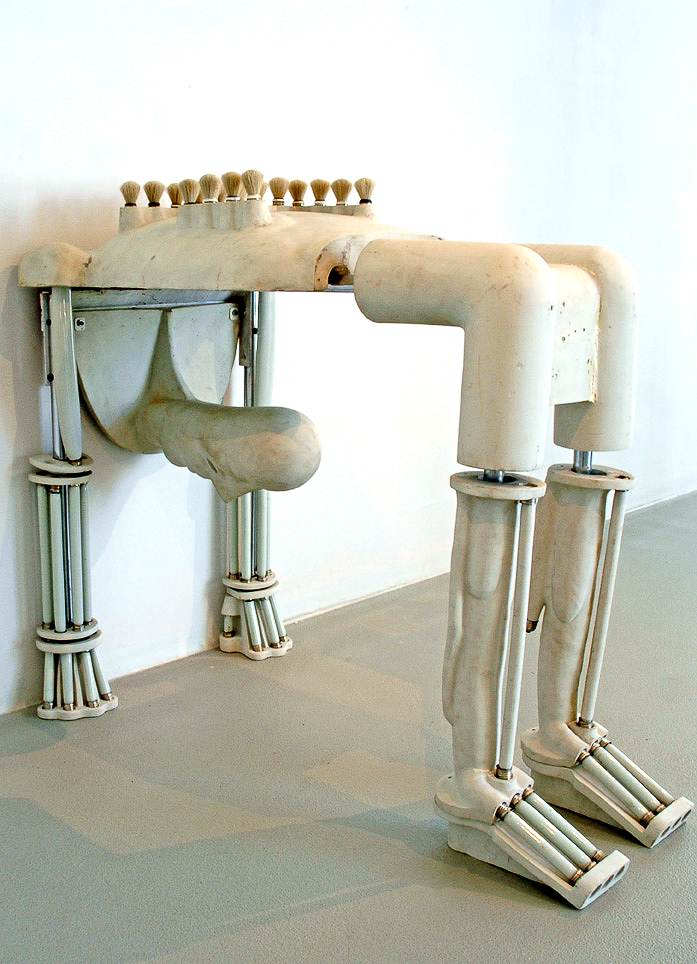
Breasts in a Different Way (1996–1997), porcelain, shaving brushes, 120x97 cm

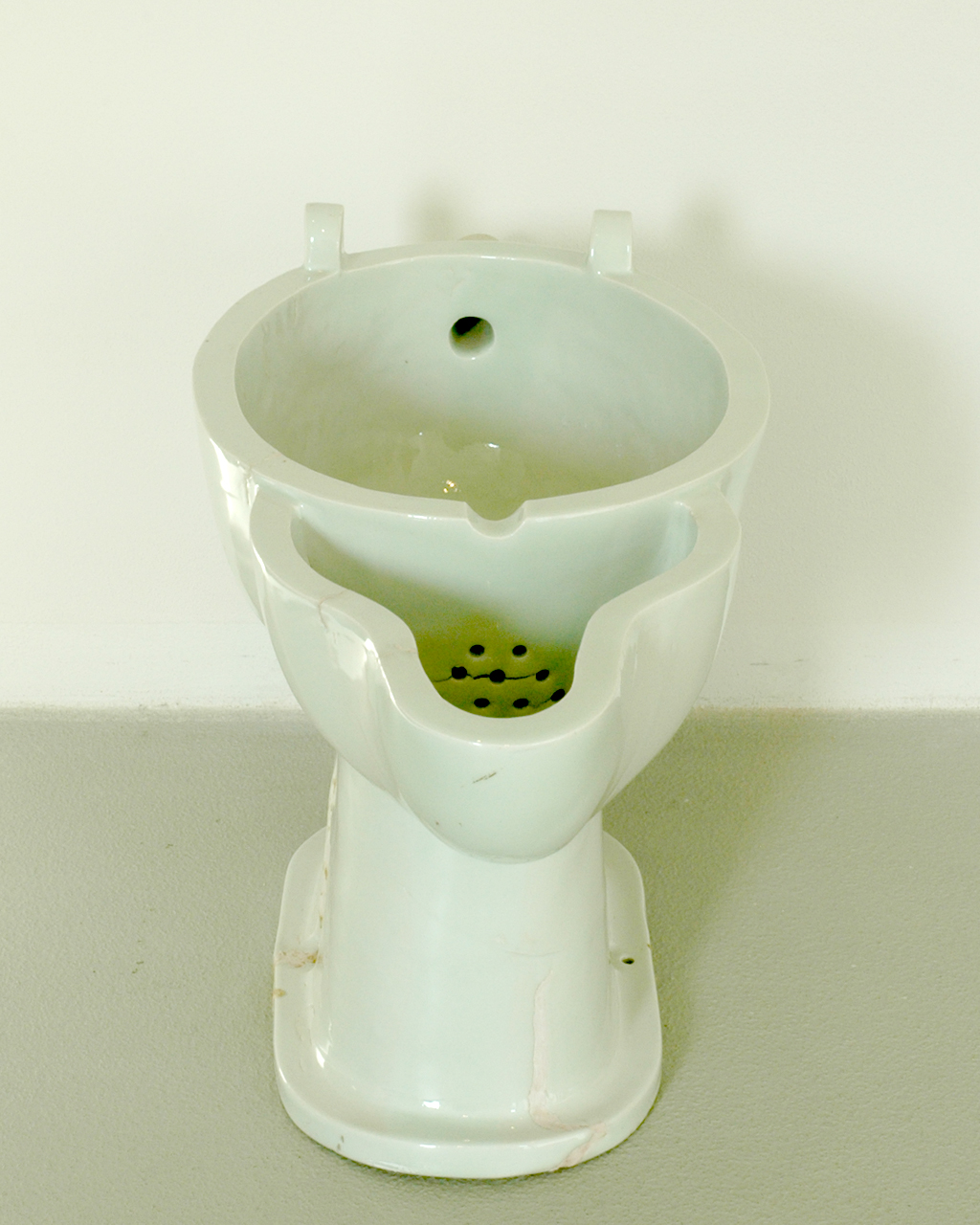
Toilet - men's and women's urinal, from the series Tender Toilet Bowls (1999)

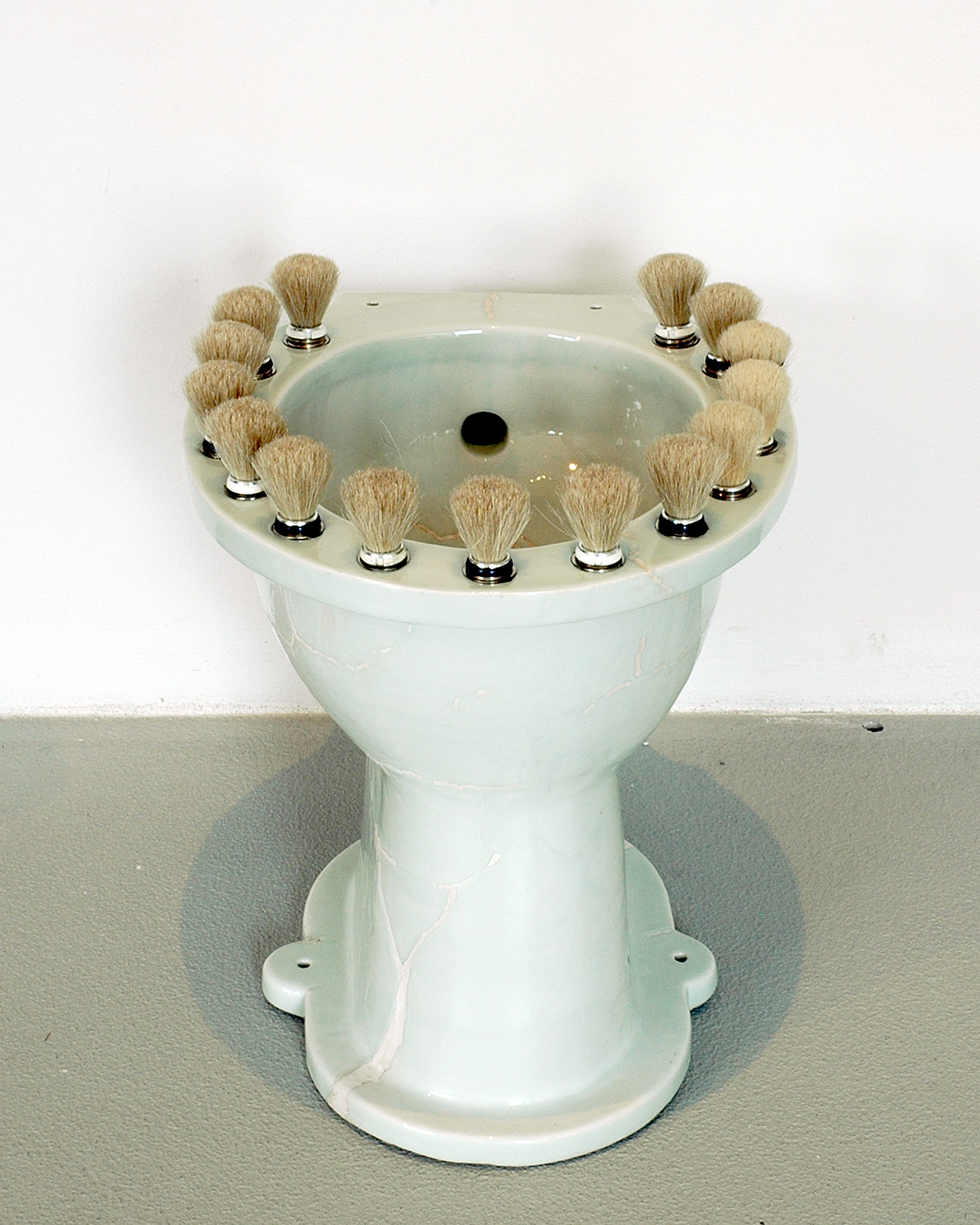
Toilet, from the series Tender Toilet Bowls (1999)

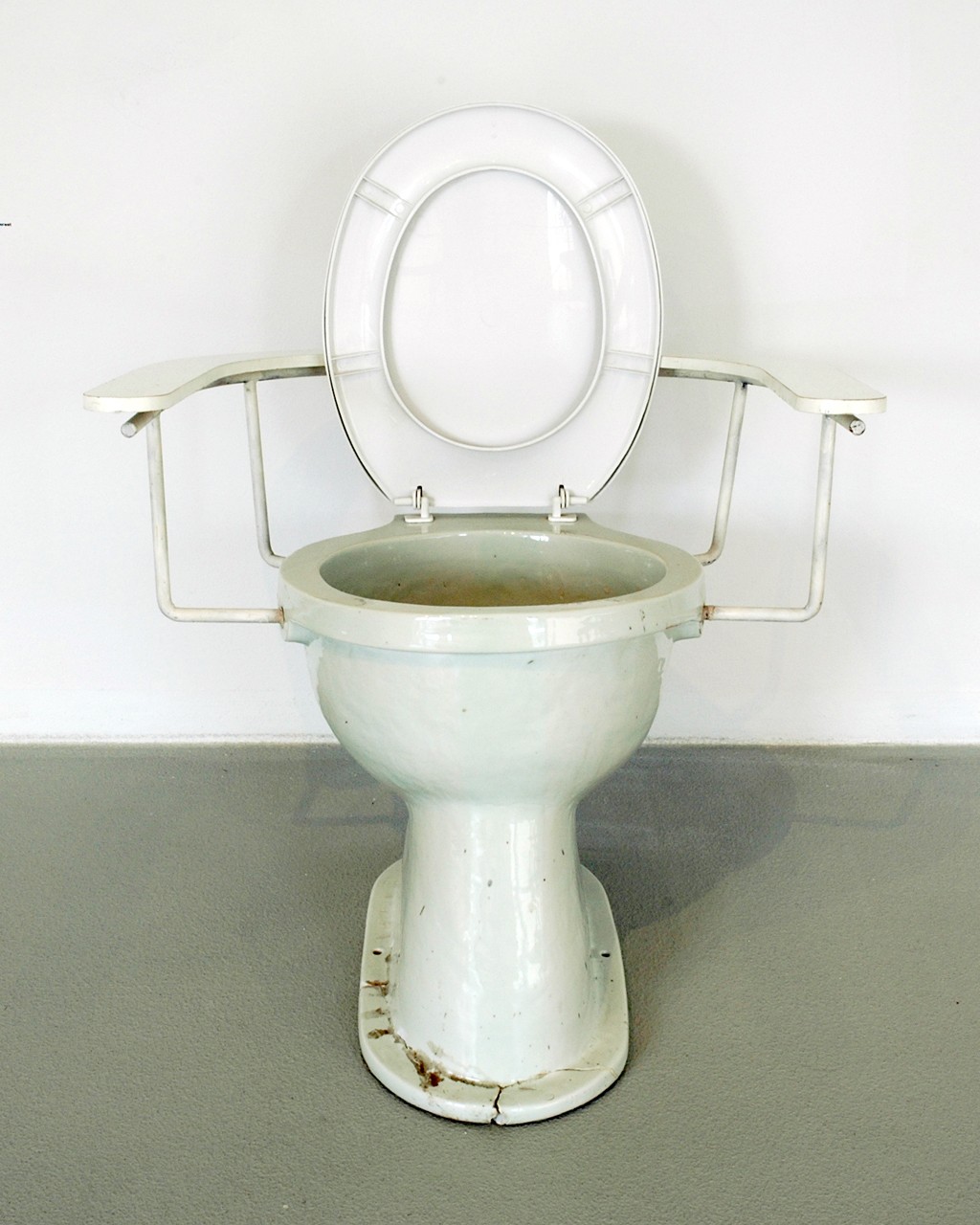
Toilet with backrest, from the series Tender Toilet Bowls (1999)

=== Late works ===
During the symposium in Greiz, he created monumental figures in cast iron. Towards the end of his career, Nepraš reduced the volumes and range of materials and restricted himself to the use of plumbing pipes and couplings, some of which he cast in bronze. They feature a contrast between the sublime tradition of noble materials and the interpretation of the figure through the water pipe. In their title, he demonstratively claims historical inspiration with the self-irony inherent in all his work. His most recent sculptural works were a series of minimalist metal sculptures, Egypt-Giacometti-Nepraš (National Gallery Prague), in which pure sculptural form contrasts with the non-artistic materials used.

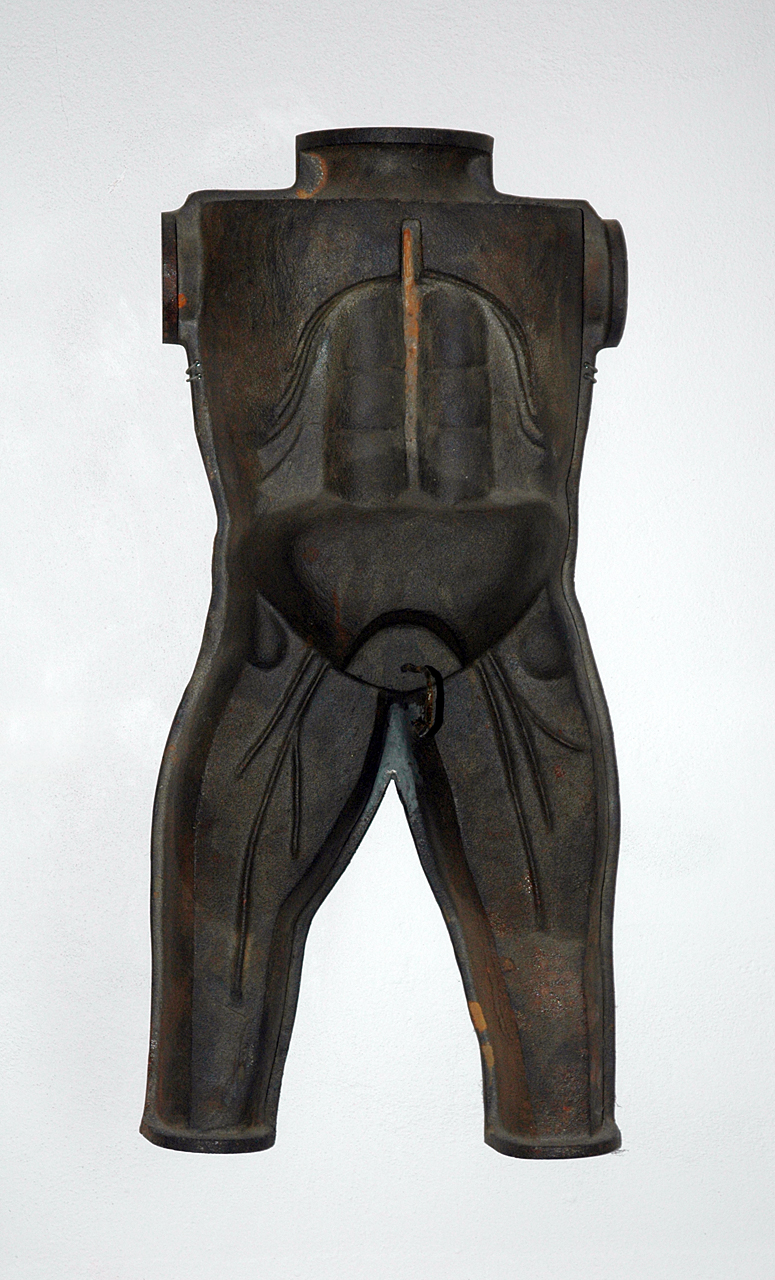
from the series The Measure of Accountability (1993)

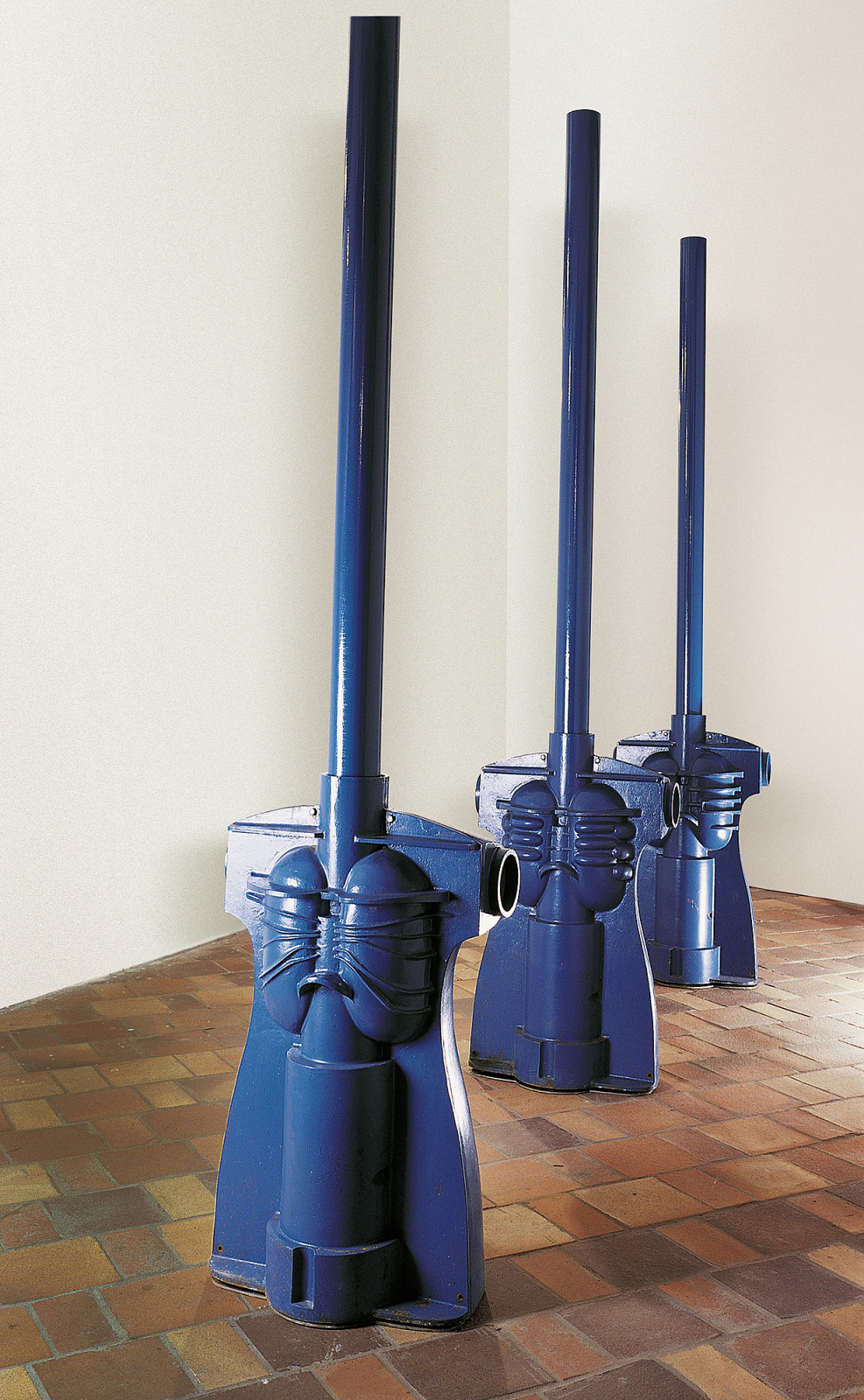
Three Half-figures (1999)

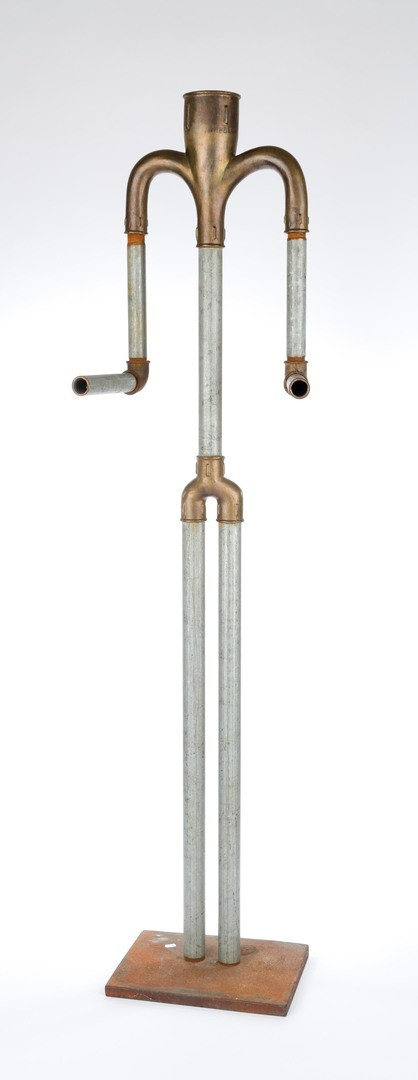
Standing figure (1990s)

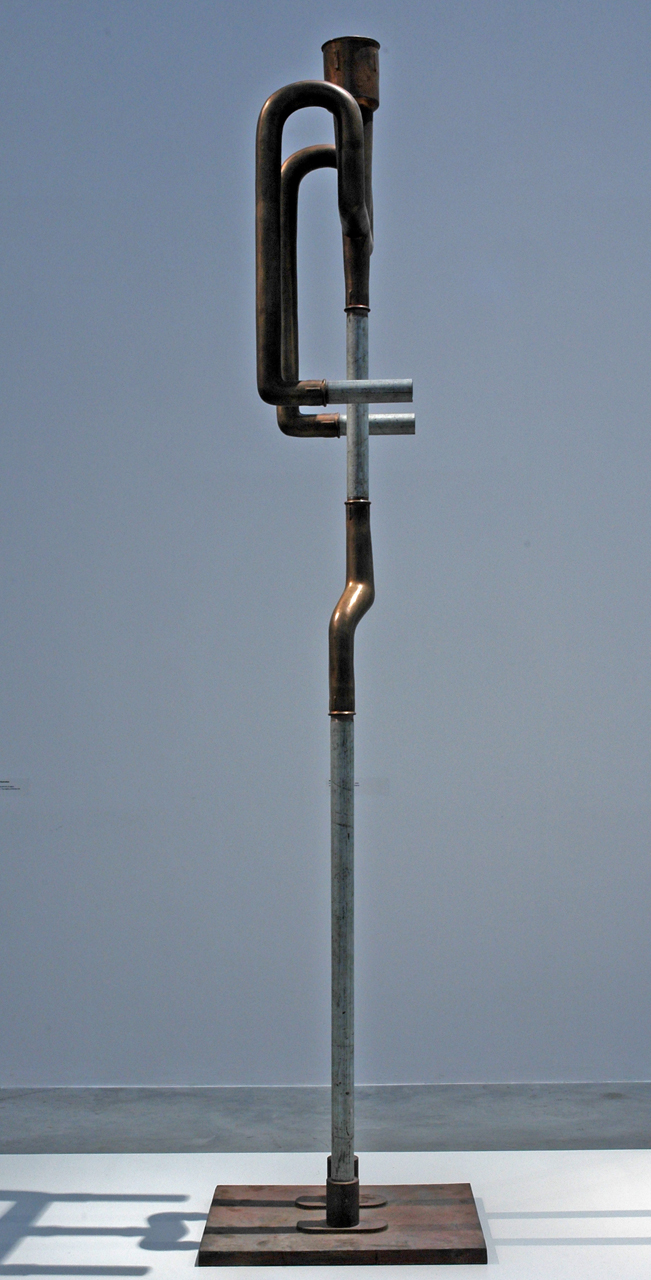
Standing (1999)

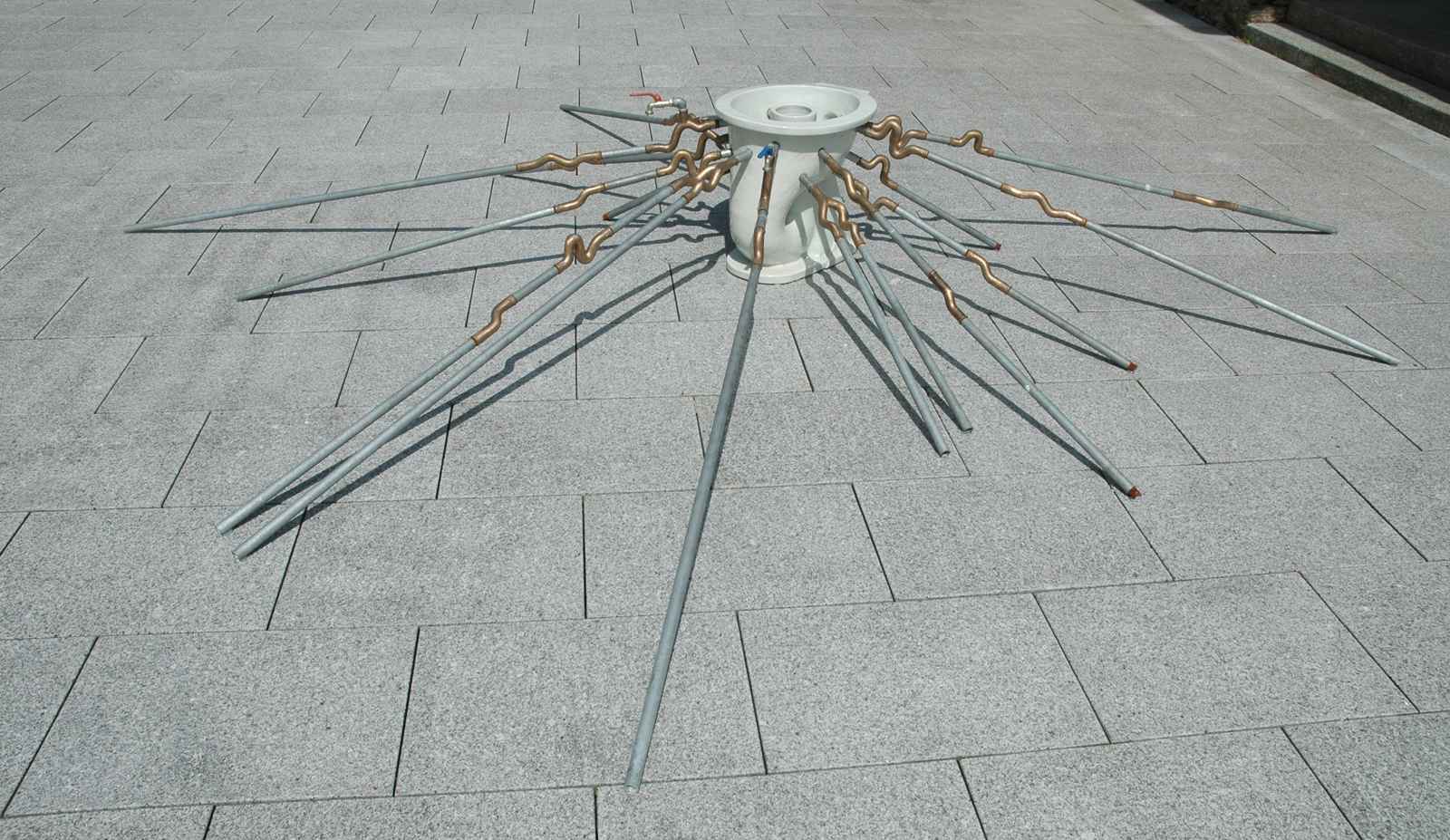
Springs of the Vltava River (2000)

Karel Nepraš was never interested in current trends in art, but rather in tradition and relied on his intuition. He was blessed with an extraordinary dose of black humour and as a seemingly non-participant or cruel observer he drew attention to small and large tragedies of human fates. His work was playful and spontaneous, and his humour, sometimes bordering on the unbearable, was a serious and cruelly truthful statement. Although he is often considered the founding figure of the "Czech grotesque", his sculptures have their roots in the tragic period of the 1950s and the times of normalization after the occupation of Czechoslovakia in 1968. They have a strong existential subtext and cannot be interpreted in a conventional way. His "Dialogues" are thus rather a reflection on the impossibility of dialogue, "Figure with a filling" is a press for a figure, "Moroa" and other sculptures made of wire and textile are "monsters whose eccentric physicality teeters on the edge of the line between horror and ridiculousness" (M. Halířová).

==== Quotes ====
Never mind what you emphasize. But you have to emphasize something' KN, in: Jaroslav Anděl (ed.), Karel Nepraš, 2012, p., p. 111

You can laugh any way you like, but art, even if it is grotesque, is serious KN, Ironstory

=== Realizations in public space ===
In 1962 Karel Nepraš participated in a commission for the Church of St. Peter and Paul in Jedovnice, for which he designed the railings for the choir with the organ. The altar was created by Mikuláš Medek and Jan Koblasa.

The first commission in collaboration with architect Pavel Kupka was a relief with stylized aluminum heads in the entrance to the Office Machines building in Prague on Můstek (1969–1971). The relief has been missing since the rebuilding of the Prague Metro station in the 1990s. During the realization of the aluminium reliefs, Nepraš mastered the technique of modelling moulds for casting and thus remained completely independent in his further work. The second commission was a copper advertising banner Tailor's dummy - Gown (1968) in pedestrian zone, conceived as a house sign.

Karel Nepraš has mastered the technique of modelling and casting in cast iron at the 1969 Sculpture Symposium of Spatial Forms in Ostrava, where he created his principal work Family Ready to Leave (1969) (uninstalled in 1974 and destroyed in the 1980s). The reconstructed sculptural group, created in 2011-2015 according to preserved Nepraš's designs, is exhibited permanently in Centre of Contemporary Art DOX, Prague.

In the early 1970s, he also took interest in the design of a modern fountain for the castle park in Litomyšl. In the 1970s, Nepraš was forced to make a living as restorer for existential reasons. Thanks to the architect Pavel Kupka, he was at least able to create some realizations in architecture, for example on the facade of the Mourning Hall in Svitavy (1973).

Karel Nepraš also used cast iron elements and steel in larger objects for public space (Cameraman, 1988, Bower and Springhouse, 1989, Home for the elderly in Malešice). After the revival of the Ostrava Symposium, Nepraš created the sculpture Yogi in 1993, which was installed in the Milada Horáková orchard in Ostrava. In 1993–1994 he started collaboration with the Regional Gallery in Zlín and during symposium Prostor Zlín (Space Zlín) has created large sculpture group Dialogue VIII - Lighting conductor, which is installed since 1994 in front of Alternative - Culture Institute Zlín.

Continued cooperation with arch. Kupka was important for his projects for architecture also in the 1990s. At that time he abandoned assemblages and created a series of stylistically pure cast-iron torso casts (Measure of Responsibility, 1993), figural columns for Liechtenstein Palace (realized by SVOAS, Stará Huť's foundry and engineering plant), semi-figures – columns Three Figures (1999, Museum Kampa) or designs for the stone elements of the staircase of Liechtenstein Palace. In his inventive design of the balustrades and railings of the stair hall, he applied the motif of singing angelic choirs in profile.

In front of the Tuscany Palace at Hradčany Nepraš's stone columns are made in Baroque proportions of stylized busts of ladies wearing a neckcloth, thus forming the counterpart of the male guards of Prague Castle. The height of the bollards in the sloping terrain creates a straight line horizontally. Nepraš's grotesque relief masks above the non-functional fireplace in the main hall of the palace complete the mannerist character of the hall. Kupka and Nepraš are united by a special degree of artistic sensitivity and a desire for maximum purity and perfection of formal order. Nepraš's work is not only an accompanying decoration, but co-determines significantly the character of the place and brings the spirit of the present into Baroque palaces.

Nepraš's latest realization for public space is the Monument to Jaroslav Hašek, which contains a merger of two classical ideas - an equestrian statue and a Herm. Nepraš has been designing this untypical monument for Hašek since 1995 In the case of the monument, where the necessity of a realistic portrayal of the face could not be circumvented, Nepraš solved the need for free expression with a minor spitefulness in the style of his drawings and perched the bust of the writer on a plinth that runs through the body of the horse. The stylized sculpture of the horse was refreshed by a counter with beer trays and an unobtrusive quotation of his earlier sculptures composed of plumbing materials. Originally, the monument was to include a functional beer tap. The sculptor did not live to see the completion of the monument and therefore the bust of Jaroslav Hašek and the horse's legs was created by the sculptor's daughter Karolína Neprašová in 2005.

In 2008, another cast of the horse statue from the Jaroslav Hašek monument was placed in the reconstructed Nostic Palace (Ministry of Culture). The horse passes through the wall and while its rear part is located in the former stables, the head of the horse is visible in the dominant view from the palace courtyard.

==== Sculptures in public space ====
- Family ready to leave (1969), Ostrava, destroyed in the 1980s, second cast of sculpture installed on the terrace at the Centre of Contemporary Art DOX, Prague
- Tailor's dummy - Gown, Na Můstku street, Prague (1970s)
- Two-side relief of Sundial and facade of the Mourning Hall in Svitavy (1973)
- Cameraman, Barrandov, Prague (1989)
- Bower and Springhouse, Prague-Malešice (1989)
- Figural Columns (27 executed nobles of Bohemia), Liechtenstein Palace, Prague (1988–1993)
- Yogi, Ostrava (1993)
- Dialogue VIII - Lighting conductor, Zlín (1994)
- Stylized figural columns, Fireplace, Tuscany Palace, Prague (1994–1998)
- Communication, OSJEP Brno (1999)
- Monument of Jaroslav Hašek, Prokopovo square, Prague-Žižkov (1995–2005)
- Horse statue, Nostic Palace (Ministry of Culture)
- Permanent exposition of sculptures in front of the Trade Palace, National Gallery Prague (before 2020)
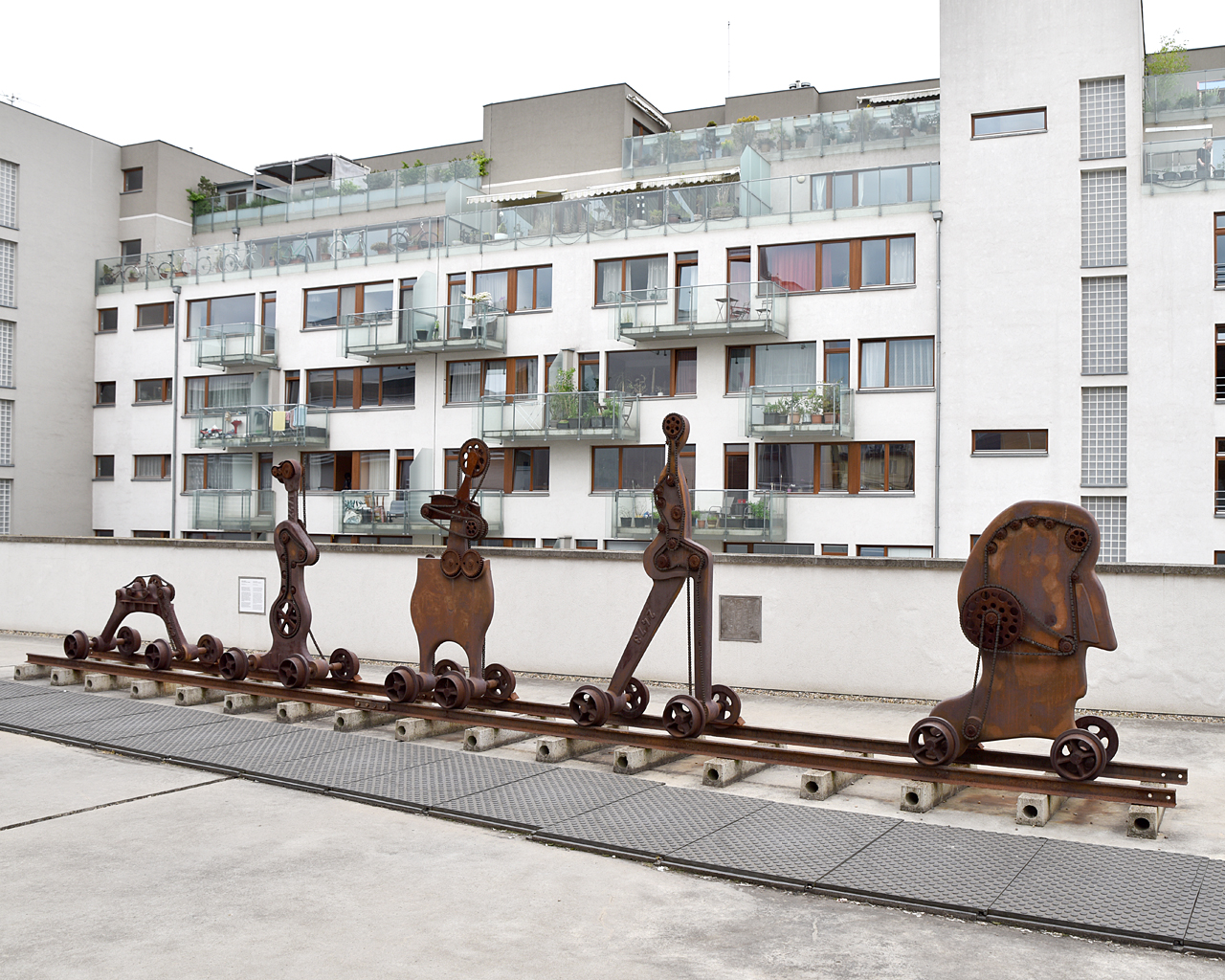
Family ready to leave (1969), second cast of sculpture, DOX, Prague

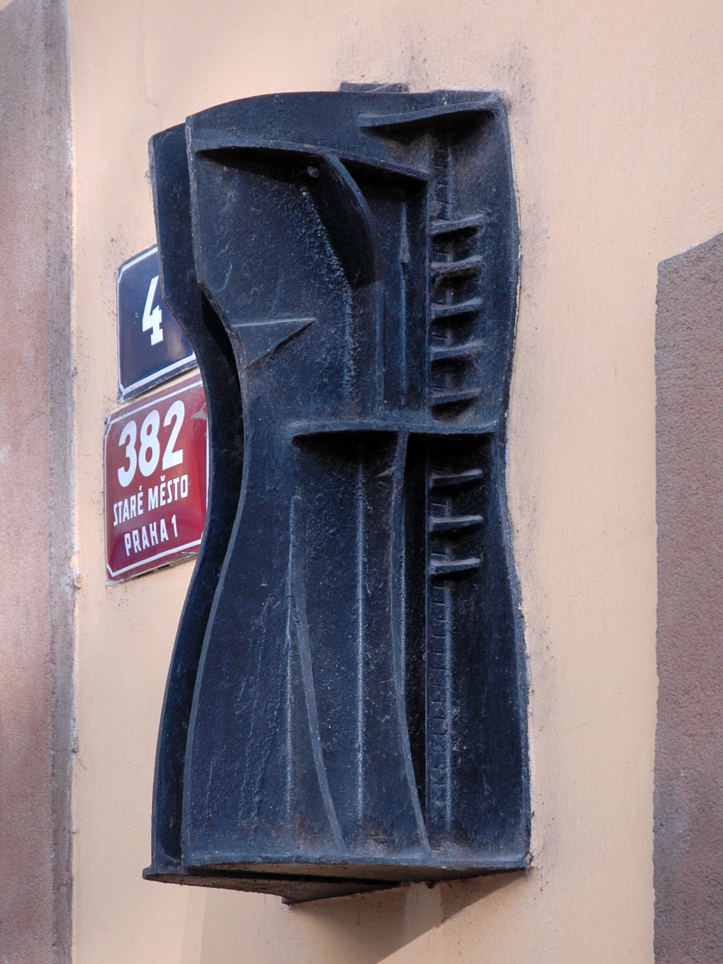
Tailor's dummy - Gown, Na Můstku street 4, Prague (1970s)

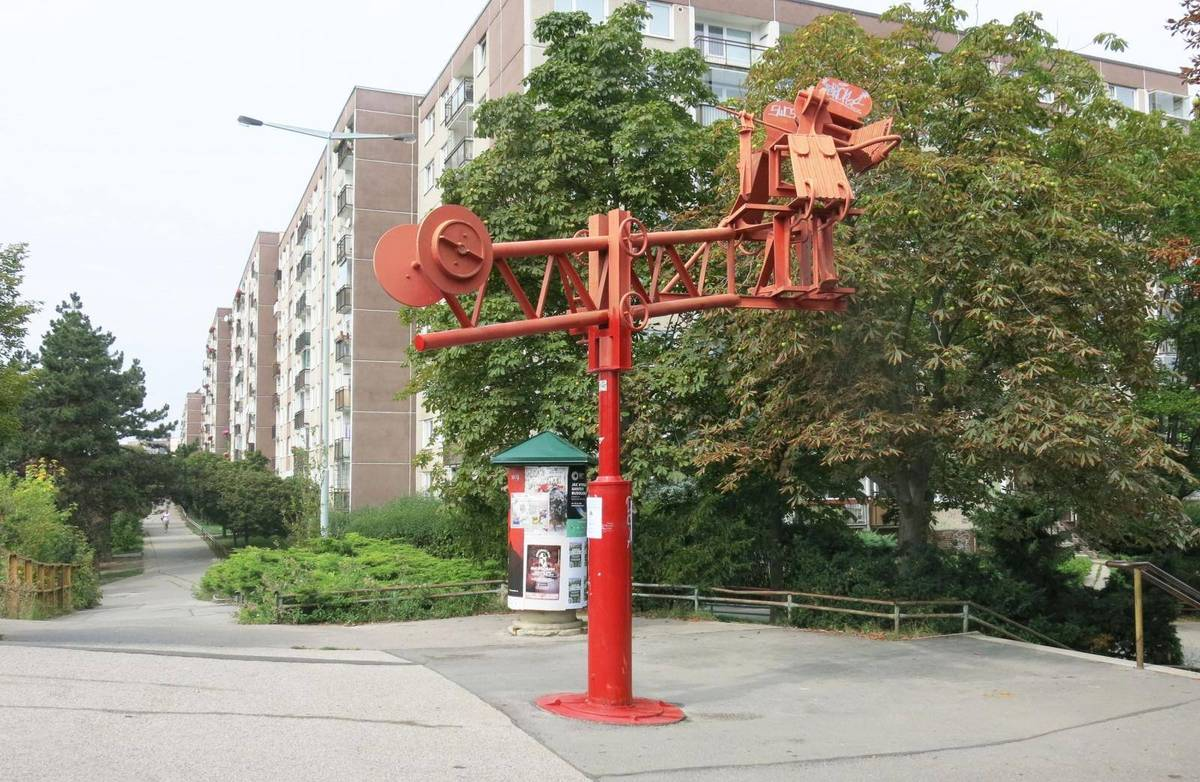
Cameraman, 1989, Prague-Barrandov

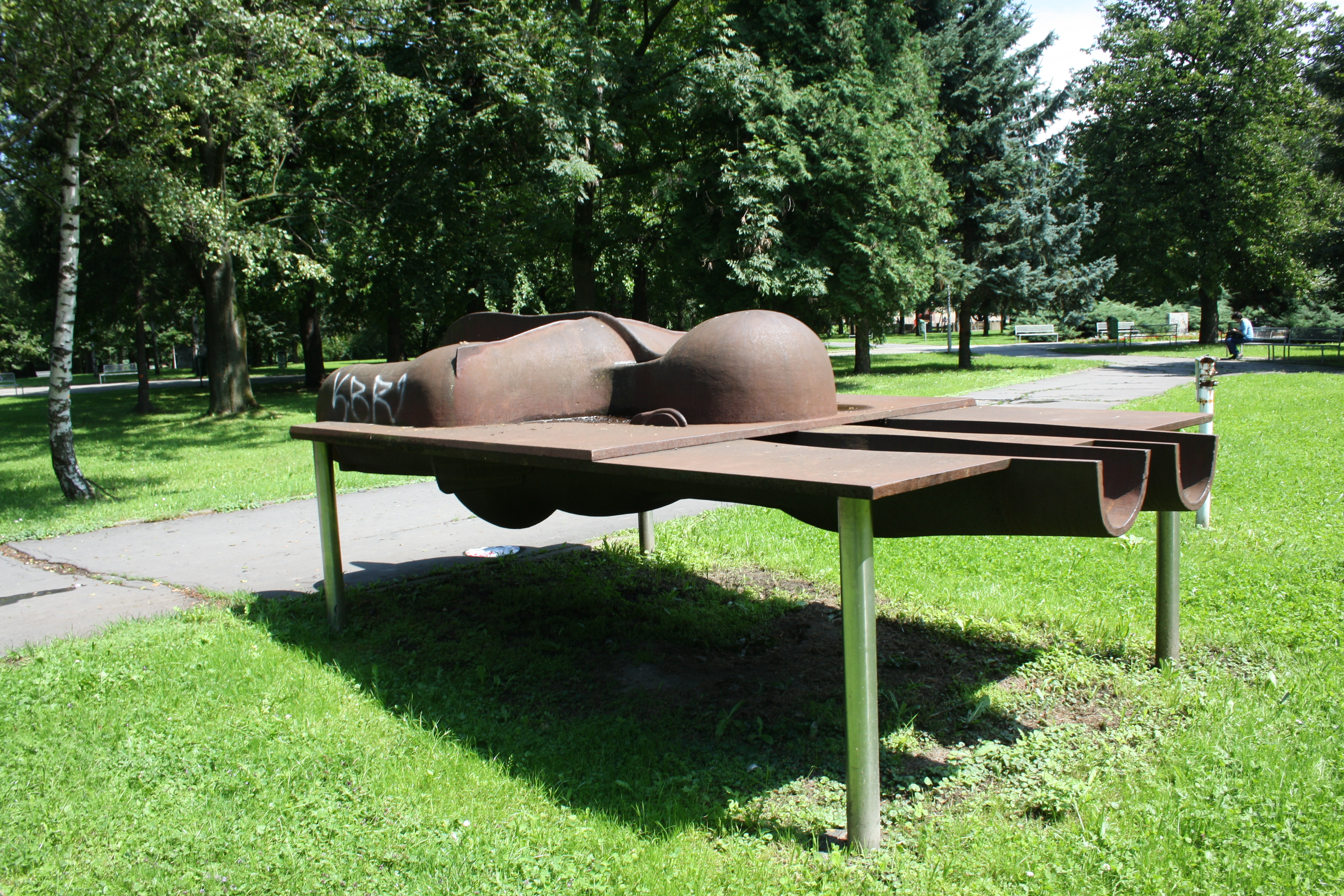
Yogi (1993), orchad of Milada Horáková, Ostrava

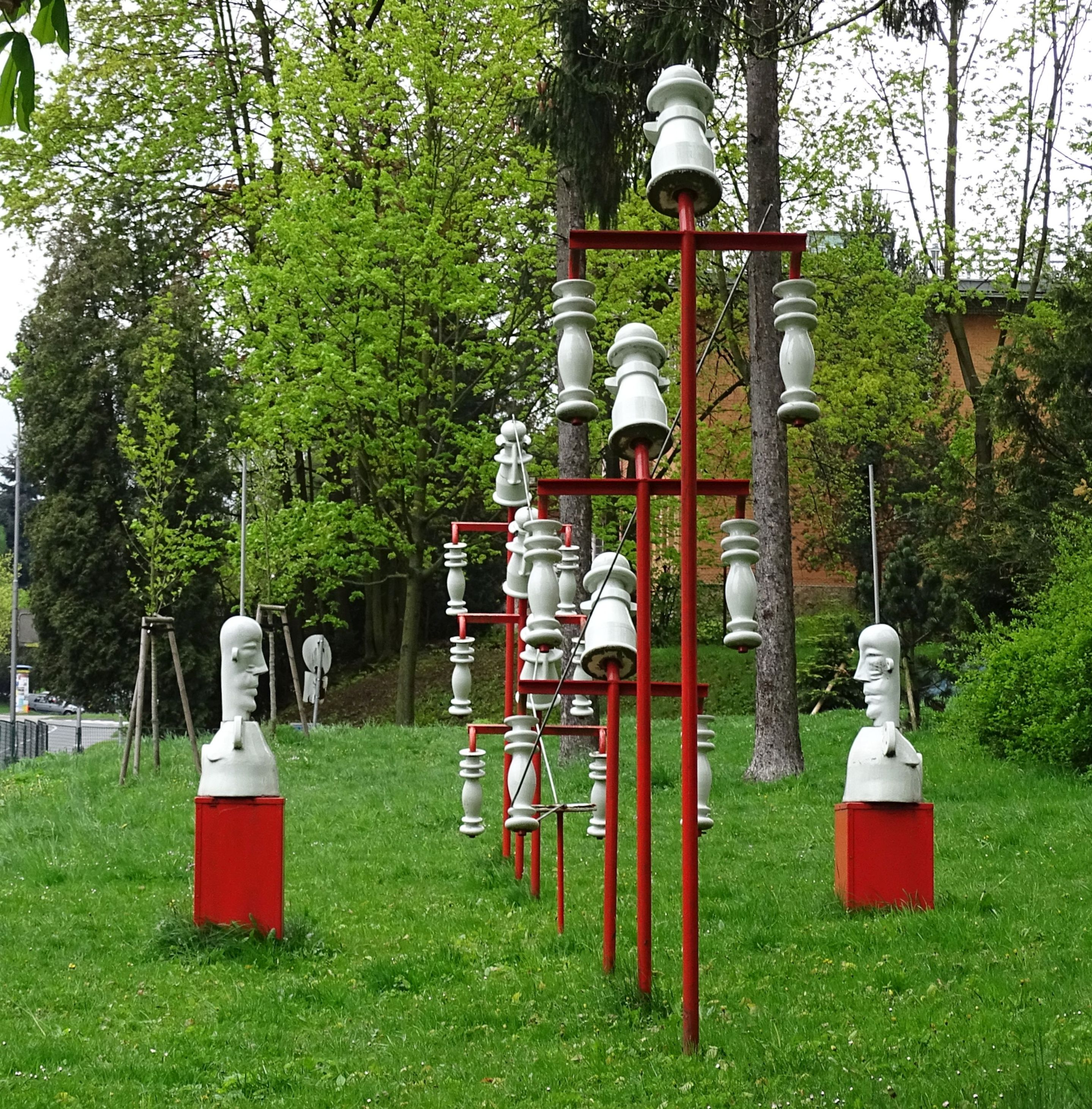
Dialogue VIII - Lighting conductor, Zlín (1994)

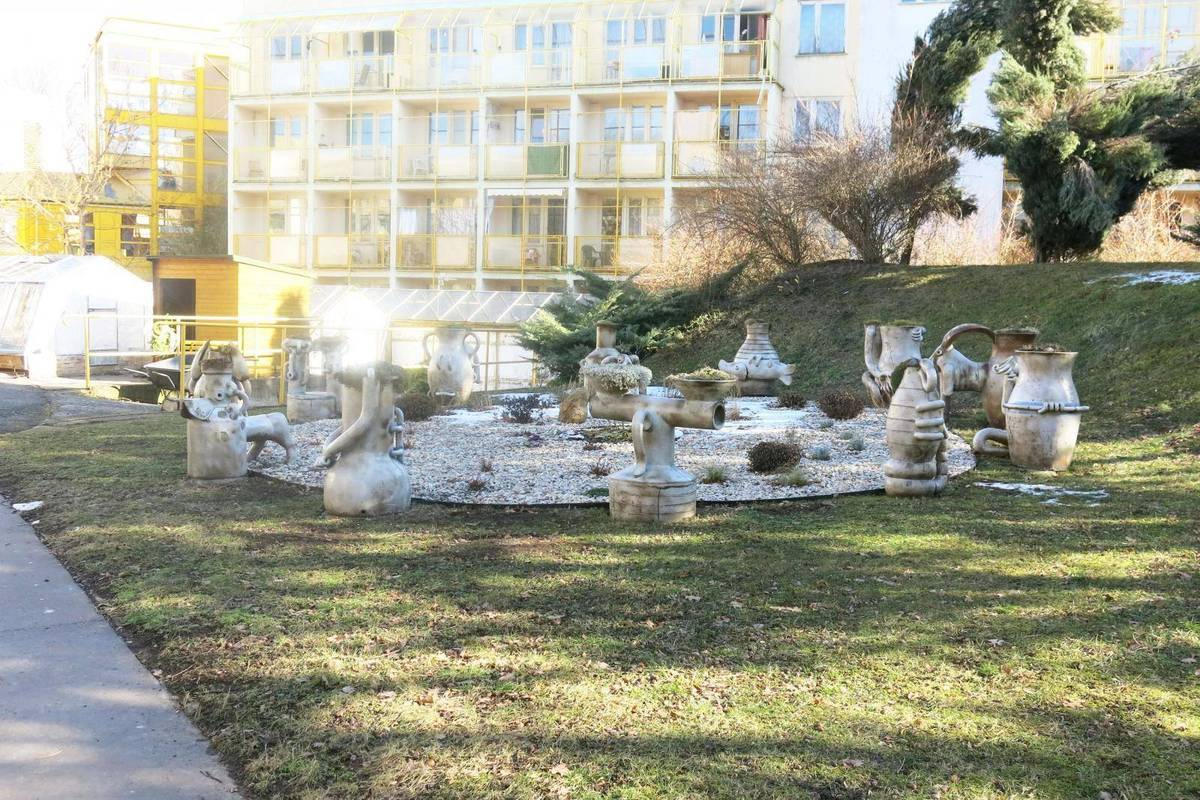
Ceramic sculpture zodiac at the home for the elderly in Řepínská Street, Prague

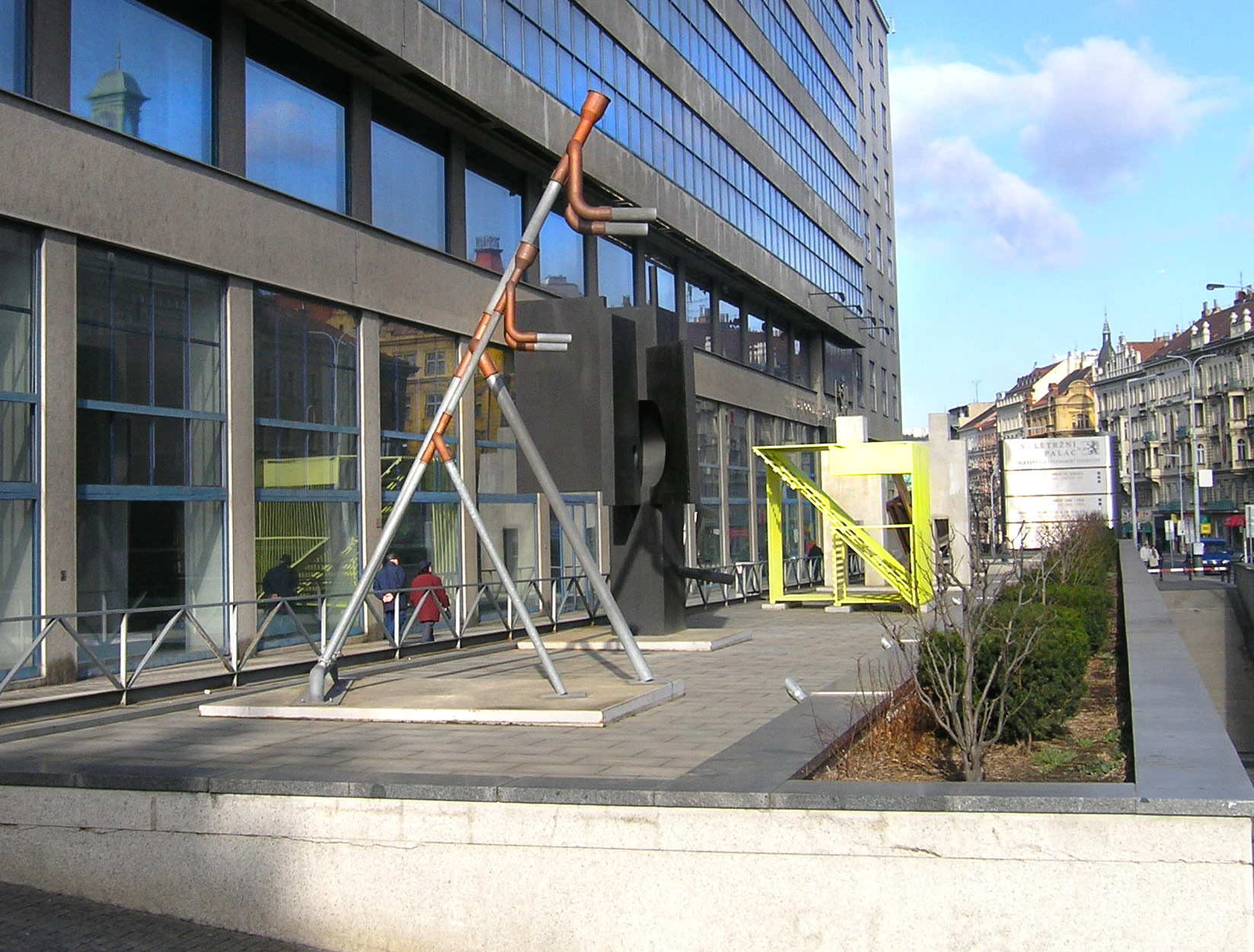
Egypt-Giacometti-Nepraš, Trade palace, National Gallery Prague (before 2020)

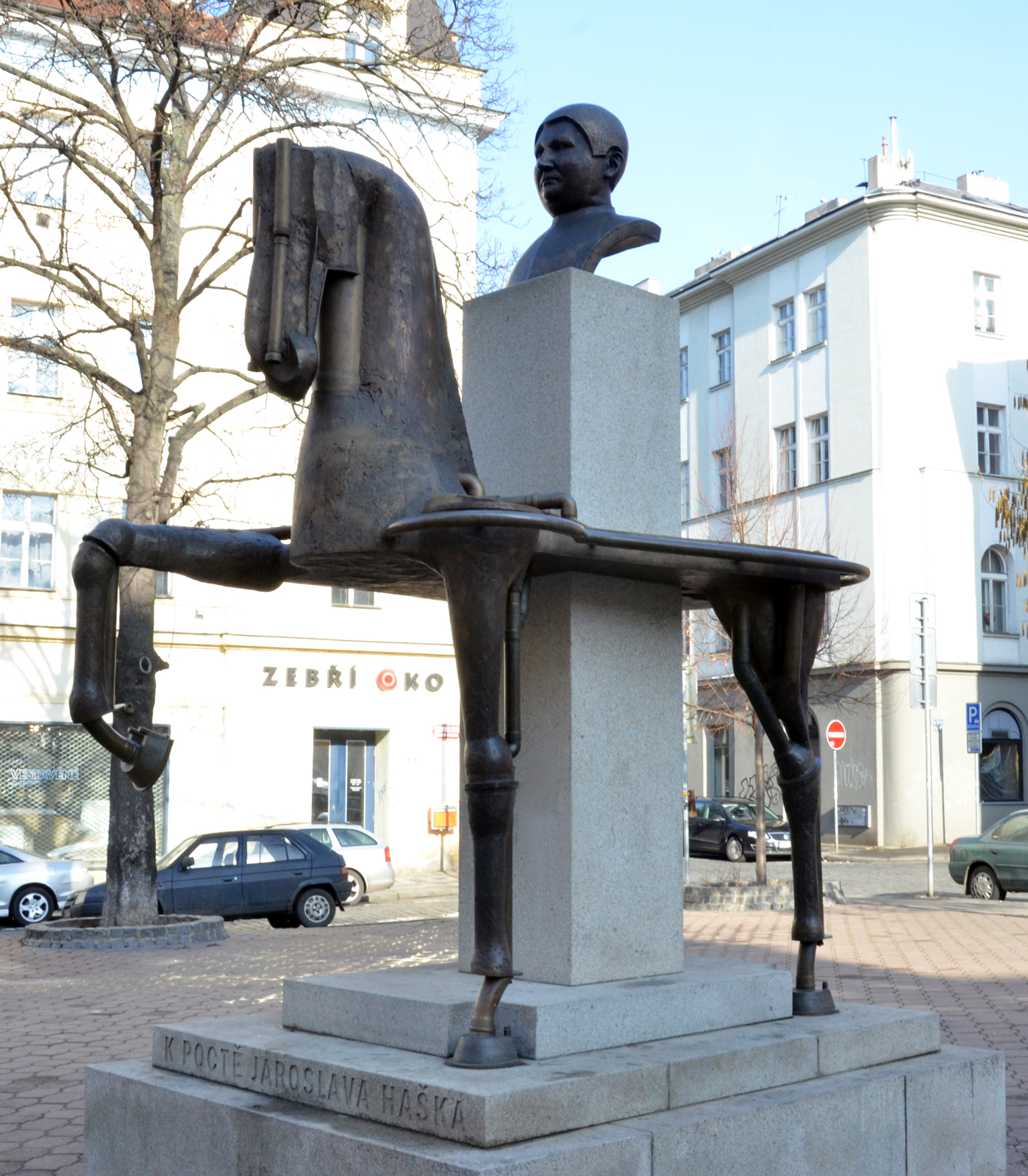
Monument of Jaroslav Hašek (2005)

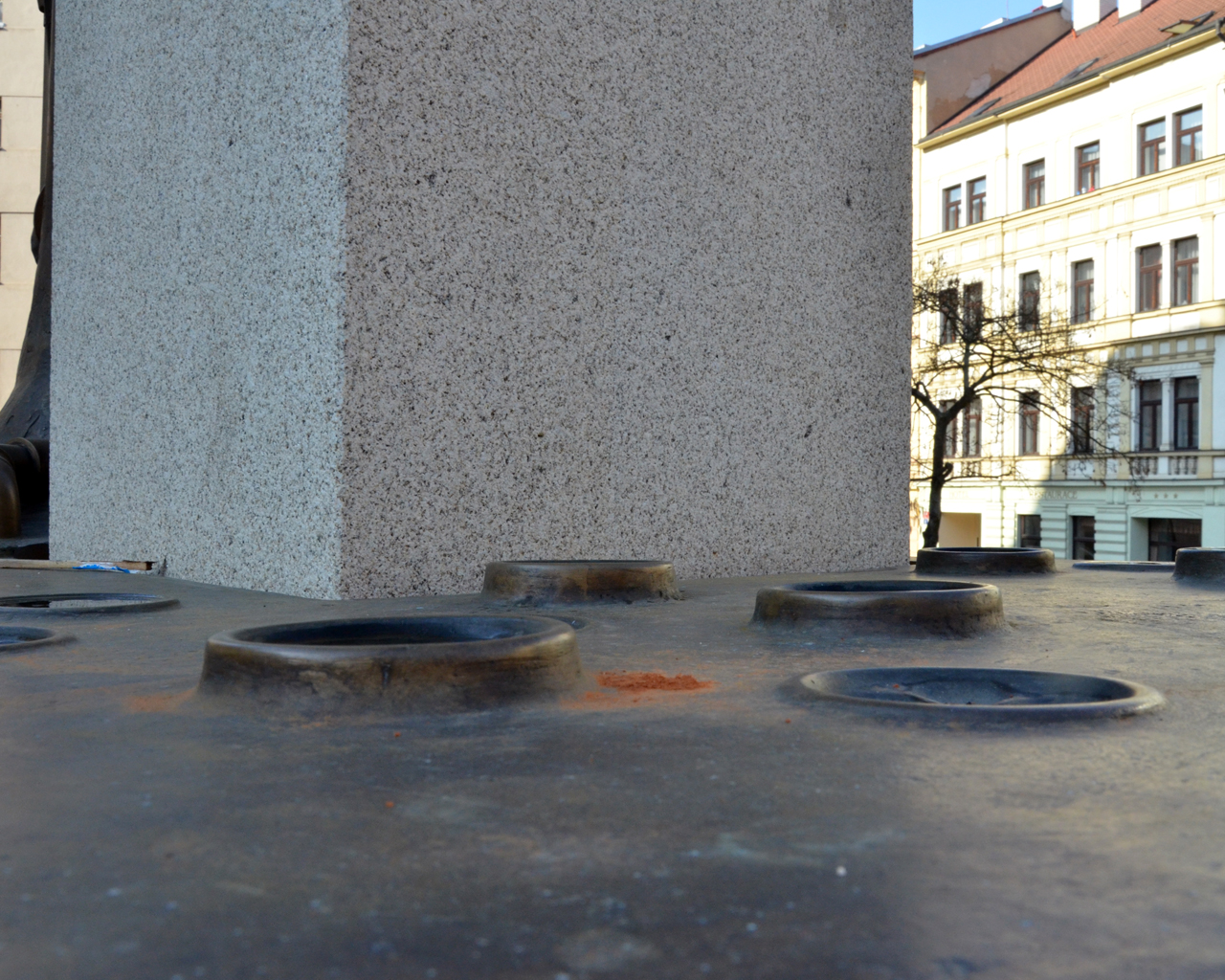
Monument of Jaroslav Hašek (2005), detail

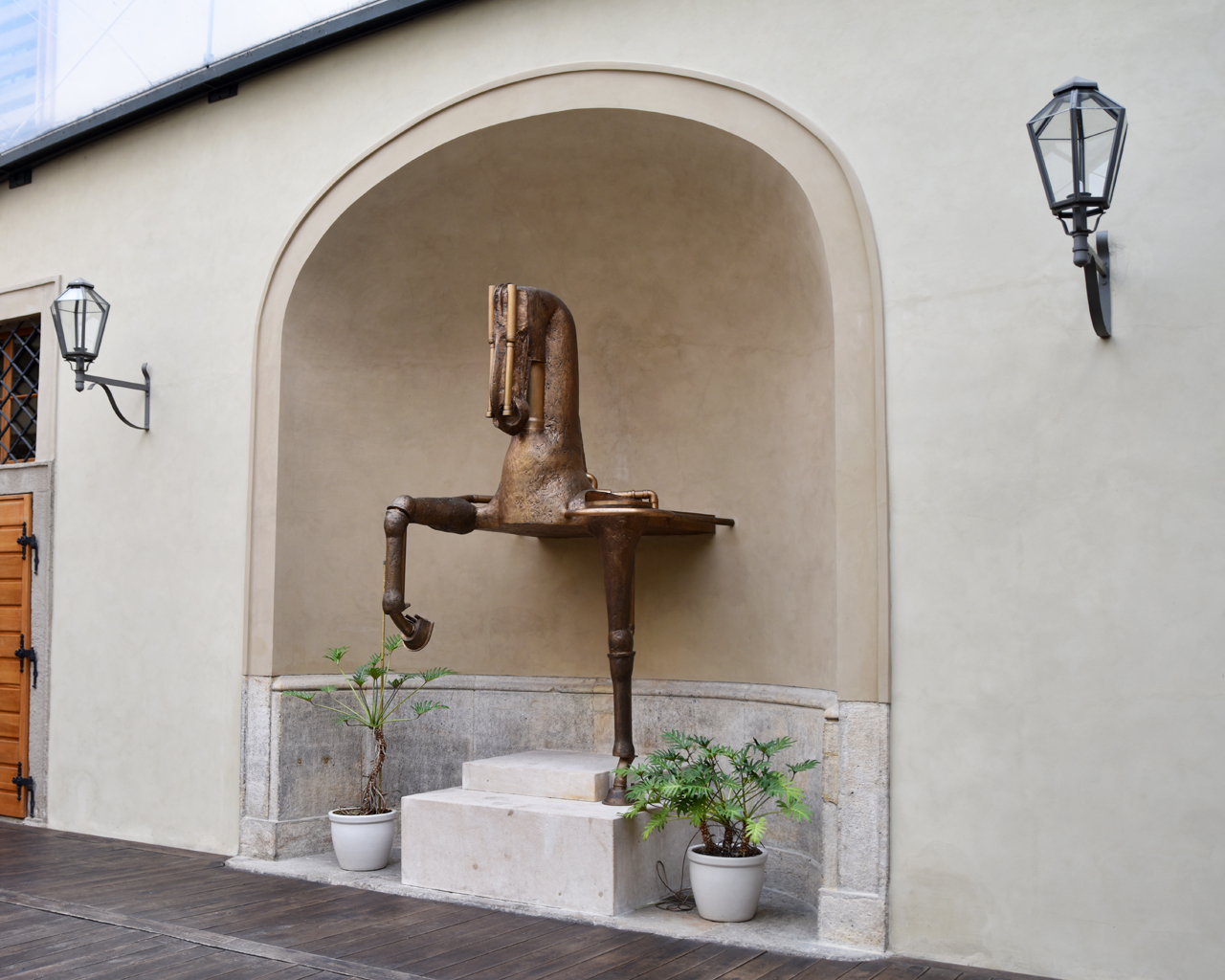
Horse(2008), Nostic Palace (Ministry of Culture)

==== Realizations in architecture ====
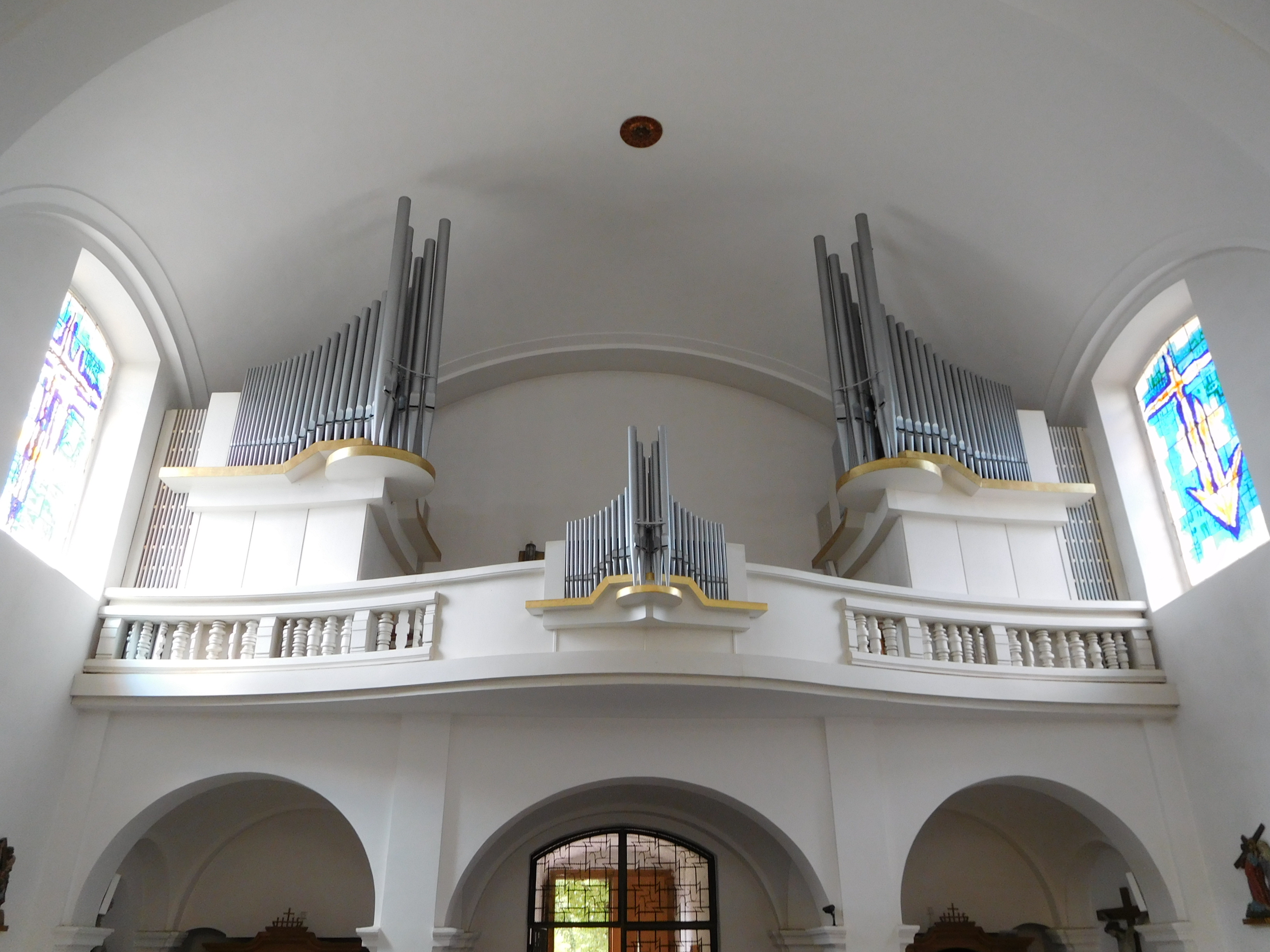
railings for the choir, Church of Sts. Peter and Paul, Jedovnice (1963)

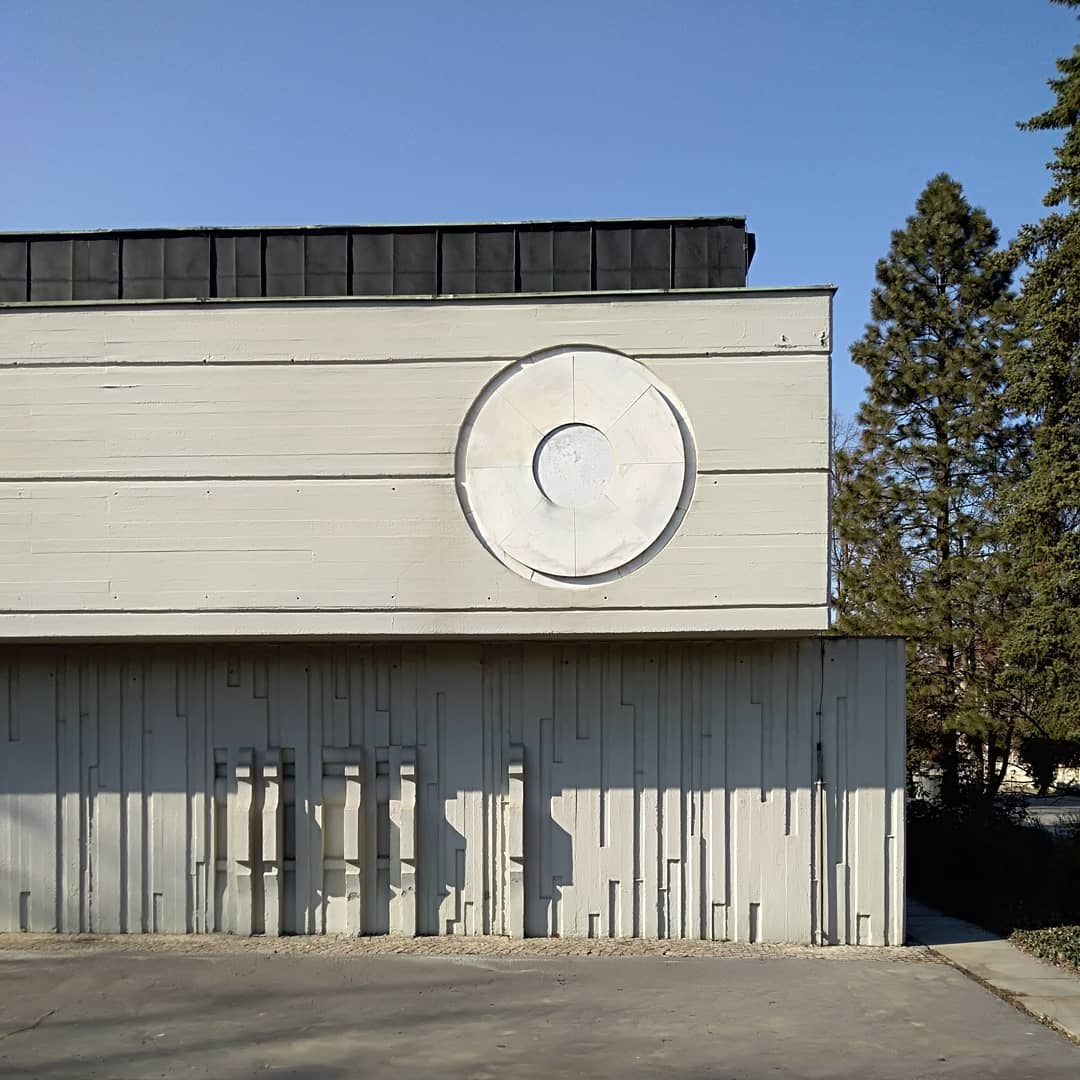
facade of the Mourning Hall in Svitavy (Nepraš, arch. Kupka, 1973)

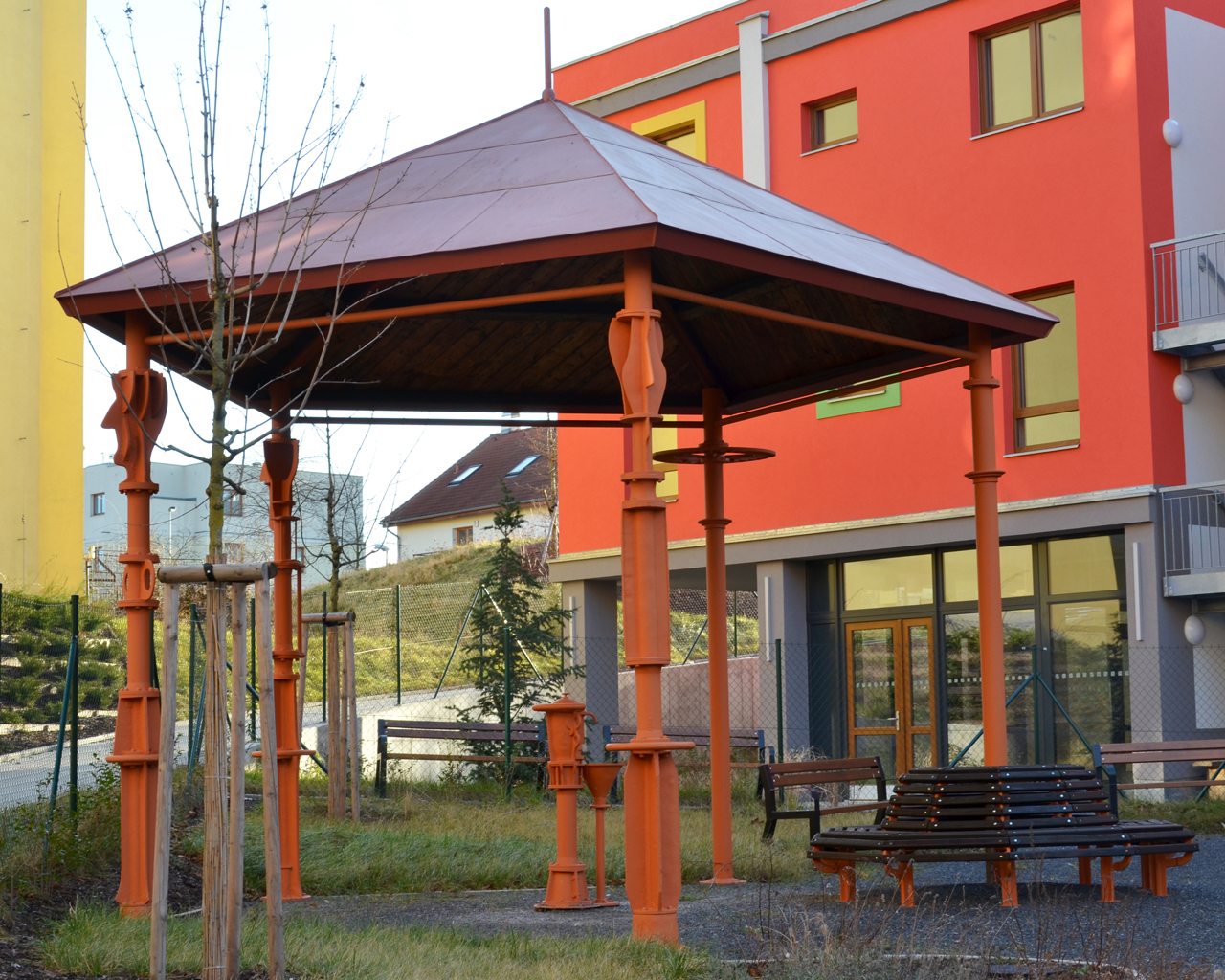
Bower and Springhouse, Home for the elderly in Prague-Malešice (1989)

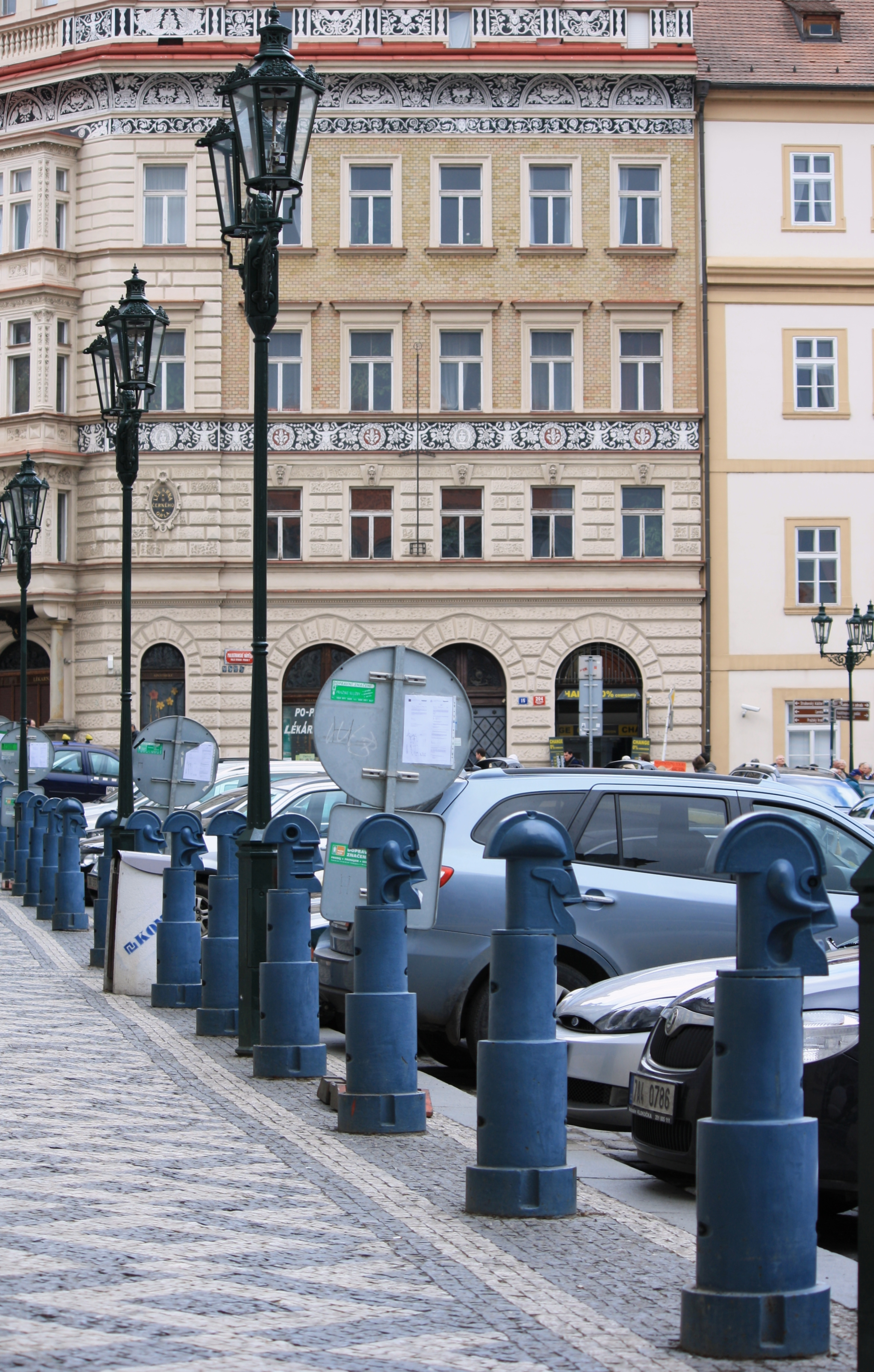
Figural columns (27 executed nobles of Bohemia), Liechtenstein Palace, Prague (1993–1995)

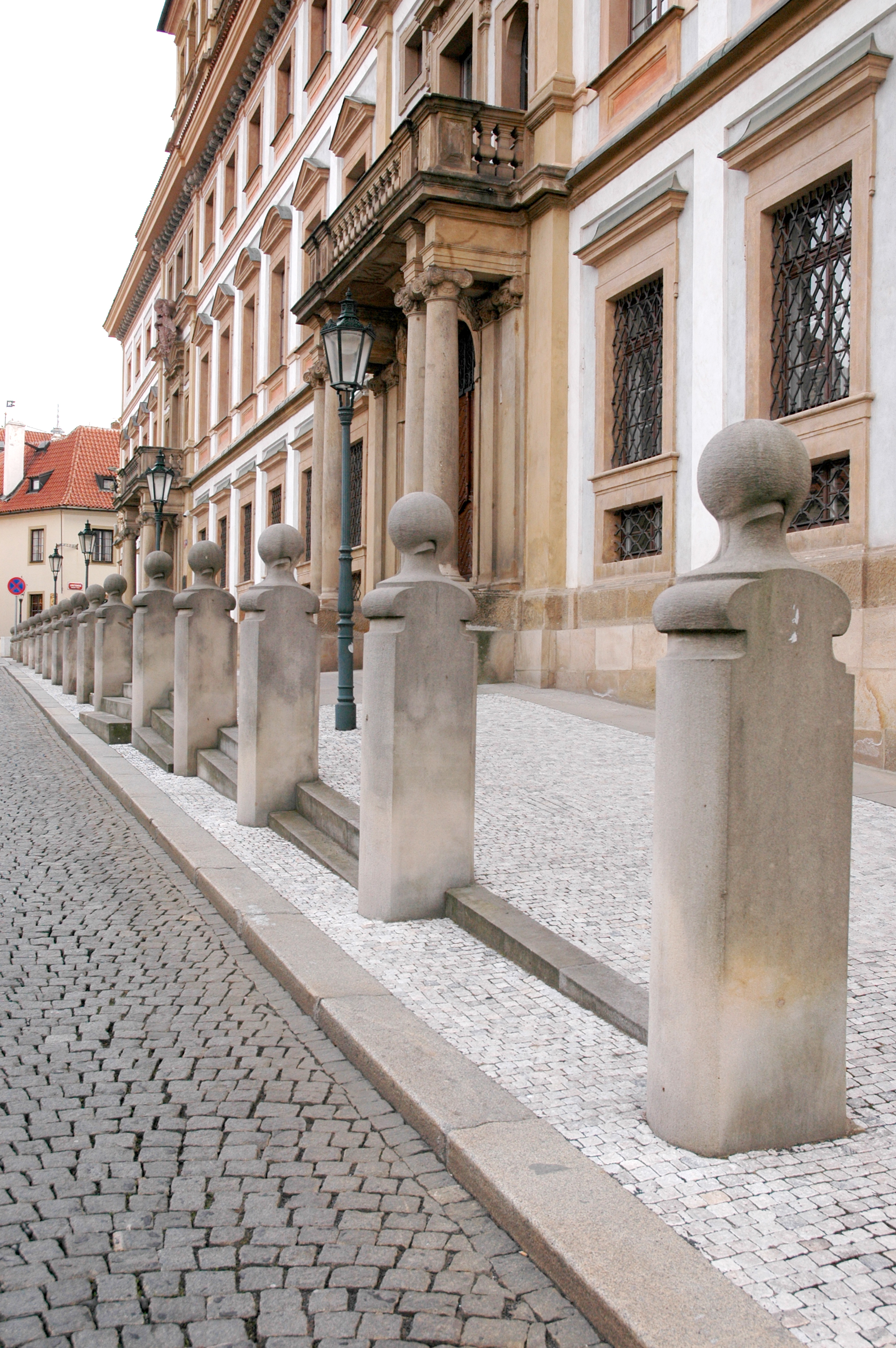
Stylized figural columns in front of the Tuscany palace, Prague (1994–1998)

=== Publications ===
- Totenklagen / Funeral songs / Cants funèbres, Artia, enterprise for foreign trade, Prague 1966
- Puppenbusen (Satirische Zeichnungen), Heinrich Heine Verlag GMBH, Frankfurt 1969

=== Representation in collections ===
- National Gallery Prague
- Moravian Gallery in Brno
- Museum Kampa, Foundation of Jan and Meda Mládek
- National Gallery of Art, Washington, D.C.
- Library of Congress, Washington, D.C.
- Musée d'art moderne de la Ville de Paris
- Museum Bochum
- Museum of Art, Łódź
- Aleš South Bohemian Gallery in Hluboká nad Vltavou
- Gallery of the Central Bohemian Region (GASK) in Kutná Hora (formerly Czech Museum of Fine Arts, Prague)
- Benedikt Rejt Gallery, Louny
- Prague City Gallery
- Gallery of Modern Art in Hradec Králové
- Gallery of Fine Arts in Cheb
- Gallery of Fine Arts in Ostrava
- Museum of Art Olomouc
- Regional Gallery in Liberec
- Museum of Art and Design Benešov
- private collections at home and abroad

=== Exhibitions ===
==== Author's (selection) ====
- 1960 Labyrinth of the World, cartoons, Rokoko theatre, Prague
- 1963 Puppet theatre, cartoons, Paravan theatre, Prague
- 1964 Sculptures, drawings, prints, Gallery at Charles Square, Prague
- 1969 Sculptures, Studium Generale, Stuttgart
- 1970 Račte točit / Just keep rotating, Václav Špála Gallery, Prague
- 1978 Karel Nepraš: Zeichnungen, plastiken, Sonnenring Galerie, Münster
- 1989 Karel Nepraš, Opatov Gallery, Prague
- 1991 Kresby, grafika, ilustrace, kreslený humor a drobná plastika / Drawings, prints, illustrations, cartoons, small sculptures, National Gallery Prague
- 1991 Sculptures, Old Town Hall, Prague
- 1992/94 Sochy / Sculptures, Regional galleries in Karlovy Vary, Olomouc, Ostrava
- 1999 Nalakuj si sám / Paint it yourself, Gambit Gallery, Prague
- 1999 Iron Story, Peron Gallery, Prague
- 2000 Karel Nepraš, Centre tchèque Paris
- 2000 Karel Nepraš 1960 - 2000, Egon Schiele Art Centrum, Český Krumlov
- 2002 Karel Nepraš, Benedikt Rejt Gallery, Louny
- 2002 Sedící, stojící, kráčející / Sitting, standing, walking, Queen Anne's Summer Palace (Belvedere), Prague
- 2007 Karel Nepraš, House of Art, Zlín
- 2008 Karel Nepraš: Česká krajina / Czech landscape, Gallery of modern art in Hradec Králové
- 2012 Karel Nepraš, DOX, Centrum současného umění / Centre for Contemporary Art, Prague
- 2016 Karel Nepraš: Family ready to leave, DOX, Centre for Contemporary Art, Prague
- 2019 Karel Nepraš: Egypt—Giacometti—Nepraš, Museum of Art and Design, Benešov

==== Collective (selection from over 300) ====
- 1954 1. Malmuzherciáda, Klub unitářů, Prague
- 1957 Výstava na jeden den / Exhibition for single day, Střelecký ostrov, Prague
- 1964 Výstava / Exhibition D, Nová síň Gallery, Prague
- 1964 Socha / Sculpture 1964, Liberec
- 1965 Šmidras, Letohrádek Ostrov
- 1965 Junge tschechische graphiker, 1. Teil, Alpbach
- 1965 Jeune Avant-garde Tchécoslovque, Galerie Lambert, Paris
- 1966 Tschechoslowakische Kunst der Gegenwart, Akademie der Künste, Berlín
- 1967 Mostra d'arte contemporanea Cecoslovacca, Castello del Valentino, Turin
- 1967 Fantasijní aspekty současného českého umění / Fantasy Aspects of Contemporary Czech Art, Regional Gallery of Highlans, Jihlava, Václav Špála Gallery, Prague
- 1967 17 tsjechische kunstenaars, Galerie Orez, The Hague
- 1968 Die Logik der durchsichtigen Nacht, Kunstamt Wilmersdorf, Berlín
- 1968 Šmidrové / Šmidras, Václav Špála Gallery, Prague, Regional Gallery, Hradec Králové
- 1969 22 grafici della Cecoslovacchia, Libreria Feltrinelli, Florence
- 1969 Sept jeunes peintres tchécoslovaques, Galerie Lambert, Paris
- 1969 Arte contemporanea in Cecoslovacchia, Galleria Nazionale d'Arte Moderna e Contemporanea (GNAM), Rome
- 1969 Nová figurace / New Figuration, Mánes, Prague
- 1969 Socha a město / Sculpture and Town, Liberec
- 1970 Tschechische Skulptur des 20. Jahrhunderts: Von Myslbek bis zur Gegenwart, Schloß Charlottenburg - Orangerie, Berlin
- 1970 Artchemo, Václav Špála Gallery, Prague
- 1970 Karel Nepraš, Naděžda Plíšková, Malinův dům, Havlíčkův Brod
- 1980/81 Eleven Contemporary Artists from Prague, New York University, University of Michigan, Ann Arbor, Michigan
- 1981 Netvořice '81, House of Bedřich Dlouhý, Netvořice
- 1985 Karel Nepraš, Jan Steklík: Žena ve výtvarném umění / Woman in Art, ÚMCH, Prague
- 1985 Barevná socha / Colourful sculpture, Gallery H, Kostelec nad Černými lesy
- 1987 Expressiv. Mitteleuropäische Kunst seit 1960, Vienna
- 1987 Grotesknost v českém výtvarném umění 20. století / Grotesqueness in 20th Century Czech Art, Old Town Hall, Prague
- 1988 Expressiv, Central European Art since 1960, Hirshhorn Museum and Sculpture Garden, Washington, D.C.
- 1988 Jan and Meda Mladek Collection, Herbert F. Johnson Museum of Art, Ithaca, New York
- 1989 Úsměv, vtip a škleb / Smile, Joke and Grin, Palace of Culture, Prague
- 1990 Pocta umělců Jindřichovi Chalupeckému / Artists' Tribute to Jindřich Chalupecký, Prague City Gallery
- 1990 Neoficiální. Umění Československa 1968-1989 / Unofficial. Art of Czechoslovakia 1968-1989, Moravian Gallery in Brno, Regensburg
- 1990 Polymorphie: Kunst als subversives Element Tschechoslowakei 1939-1990, Martin-Gropius-Bau, Berlin
- 1990 Czech Art in the Velvet Revolution, New York City
- 1991 Tradition und Avantgarde in Prag, Osnabrück, Bonn
- 1991 K.Š. Křižovnická škola čistého humoru bez vtipu / K.Š. Crusader school of pure humour without jokes, Prague, Hradec Králové, Olomouc
- 1993 Šmidrové - Škola české grotesky - 12/15 / Šmidras - School of Czech Grotesque - 12/15, Gambit Gallery, Prague
- 1993 /94 Mezinárodní sympozium prostorových forem / International Symposium of Spatial Forms, Ostrava
- 1993/94 Nová figurace / New Figuration, Litoměřice, Pardubice, Brno, Opava, Jihlava
- 1994 Ohniska znovuzrození: České umění 1956-1963 / Focal Points of Rebirth: Czech Art 1956-1963, Prague City Gallery
- 1996 Umění zastaveného času / The Art when Time Stood Still, Prague, Brno, Cheb
- 1997 Česká groteska / Czech Grotesque, Stockholm, Oslo, Helsinki, Bratislava, Košice, Warsaw
- 1999 Sympozium železné plastiky 1998 / Symposium of Iron Sculpture 1998, National Gallery Prague, House of Art, Brno
- 1999 Umění zrychleného času. Česká výtvarná scéna 1958 - 1968 / The art of accelerated time. Czech art scene 1958–1968, Prague, Cheb
- 2000 100 + 1 uměleckých děl z dvacátého století, House of the Black Madonna, National Gallery Prague
- 2001 Barevná socha / Colourful sculpture, North Bohemian Gallery in Litoměřice
- 2004/6 Šedesátá / The sixties, Zlatá husa Gallery, Prague, House of Art Brno, Gallery of Art, Karlovy Vary
- 2004 Kupka - Nepraš: Setkání v architektuře / Kupka - Nepraš: Encounters in Architecture, Jaroslav Fragner Gallery, Prague
- 2005 Šmidrové: Jednou Šmidrou, Šmidrou na věky / Šmidras: Once a Šmidra, always a Šmidra, Bítov Castle, Šternberk Gallery, Atrium, Prague
- 2007 Karel Nepraš a přátelé / Karel Nepraš and friends, Alternativa, Zlín
- 2007 Soustředěný pohled. Grafika 60. let ze sbírek členských galerií Rady galerií České republiky / Focused view. Prints of the 1960s from the collections of the member galleries of the Council of Galleries of the Czech Republic, Regional Gallery Liberec, Regional Gallery of Highlands Jihlava
- 2008 České a slovenské umění 60. let 20. století / Czech and Slovak Art of the 1960s, House of Art, Zlín, Gallery of Fine Arts in Ostrava
- 2009 Kupka - Nepraš: Setkání v architektuře / / Kupka - Nepraš: Encounters in Architecture, Nostic Palace, Prague
- 2010 New Sensitivity, National Art Museum of China, Beijing
- 2010 Roky ve dnech. České umění 1945-1957 / Years in days. Czech Art 1945-1957, Prague City Gallery
- 2013 Křižovnická škola čistého humoru bez vtipu / Crusader school of pure humour without jokes, Brno Gallery CZ
- 2015 Einfach phantastisch!, Barockschloss Riegersburg
- 2016 Šmidrové / Šmidras, Museum Kampa - Jan and Meda Mládek Foundation, Prague
- 2016 Křižovnická škola čistého humoru bez vtipu, Gallery of Modern Art, Roudnice nad Labem
- 2018 Jaro. Československá výtvarná scéna 1966–1968 / Spring. Czechoslovak art scene 1966–1968, Gallery of Modern Art, Roudnice nad Labem
- 2018 Anatomie skoku do prázdna: Rok 1968 a výtvarné umění v Československu / The Anatomy of a Leap into the Void: The Year 1968 and Art in Czechoslovakia, Exhibition Hall Masné krámy, Plzeň
- 2019 MEDA: Ambasadorka umění / MEDA: Ambassador of Art, Museum Kampa – Jan and Meda Mládek Foundation, Prague
- 2020 Odvrácená tvář humoru: Groteska, nadsázka an ironie v českém umění 2. poloviny 20. století ze sbírek GMU / The Reverse Face of Humour: Grotesque, Exaggeration and Irony in Czech Art of the Second Half of the 20th Century from the Collections of GMU, Gallery of Modern Art, Roudnice nad Labem
- 2022/2023 Výtvarný projekt Minisalon / Minisalon art project 15x15x5 cm, Nová síň Gallery, Prague, Umelka Gallery, Bratislava
- 2024 Zámek na zámku: Inspirace románem Franze Kafky Zámek ve výtvarném umění / The Castle at the Castle: Inspiration from Franz Kafka's novel The Castle in Fine Art, Klenová Castle

== Sources ==
=== Monography ===
- Jaroslav Anděl (ed.), Karel Nepraš, 272 p., Centrum současného umění DOX / Centre for contemporary art DOX, Prague, 2012, ISBN 978-80-87446-15-7

=== Author catalogues ===
- Karel Nepraš: Labyrint světa, kreslený humor (cartoons), 8 p., Rokoko theatre, Prague 1960
- Karel Nepraš, cat. Mráz B, 8 p. 1964
- Karel Nepraš: Račte točit / Please turn (1970), cat. Kříž J, 16 p., SVU Prague 1970
- Karel Nepraš: Račte točit / Please turn, cat. Miler K, GVU Havlíčkův Brod 1970
- Karel Nepraš: Zeichnungen, plastiken, cat. Kříž J., 36 p., Sonnenring Galerie, Münster 1978
- Karel Nepraš: Kresby, cat. Tetiva V, 24 p., Dům kultury ROH, České Budějovice 1984
- Karel Nepraš: Tradice, moralismus a groteska, cat. Kroutvor J, 2 p., KS Opatov, Prague 1984
- Karel Nepraš, cat. Juříková M, 2 p., KS Opatov 1989
- Karel Nepraš: Sochy / Scuulptures, Jiří Sopko: Obrazy / Paintings, cat. Valoch J., ZV ROH železáren Veselí nad Moravou 1989
- Karel Nepraš, cat. Igor Zhoř, Docela malé divadlo Litvínov, 1989
- Karel Nepraš, cat. Juříková M, 8 p., Správa kultúrnych zariadení MK SR 1991
- Karel Nepraš: Kresby, grafika, ilustrace, kreslený humor a drobná plastika / Drawings, graphics, illustrations, cartoons and small sculptures, cat. Juříková M, 8 p., National Gallery Prague 1991
- Karel Nepraš: Sochy / Sculptures, cat. Halířová Muchová M, 48 p., Galerie výtvarného umění v Olomouci 1991, ISBN 80-7010-012-5
- Karel Nepraš: Míra zodpovědnosti, 2 p., Galerie Behémót Prague 1993
- Karel Nepraš: Plastiky, 4 p., Městská Galerie ve věži, Planá 1998
- Karel Nepraš: Nalakuj si sám, cat. Kroutvor J, 4 p., Galerie Gambit, Prague 1999
- Karel Nepraš: Iron story, Nepraš K, Mach J, 79 p., Galerie Peron, Prague 1999
- Karel Nepraš, cat. Kroutvor J, Morganová P, 10 p., Galerie Gambit, Prague 2000
- Karel Nepraš: Sedící, stojící, kráčející / Sitting, standing, walking, cat. Rous J, Sedláková L, 92 p., Gema Art, Prague 2002, ISBN 80-86087-41-7
- Kupka – Nepraš: Setkání v architektuře / Encounters in architecture, cat. Horyna M et al., 56 p., J. Fragner Gallery, Prague 2004
- Karel Nepraš, Galerie Gema Prague, 2004, ISBN 80-86087-41-7
- Karel Nepraš, cat. Vítková M, 8 p., Galerie moderního umění, Hradec Králové 2008, ISBN 978-80-85025-75-0
- Karel Nepraš: Egypt - Giacometti - Nepraš, cat. Bartková Ochepovsky A, 24 p., Muzeum umění a designu, Benešov 2019

=== General sources (selection) ===
- Jan Kříž, František Šmejkal, Jeune Avant-garde Tchécoslovaque, Galerie Lambert, Paris 1965
- Geneviève Bénamou, L'art aujourd'hui en Tchecoslovaquie, Paris 1979
- Eleven contemporary Artists from Prague, 96 p., New York University, 1980
- Šedá cihla /Grey brick 78/1985, Jazzová sekce, Prague 1985 (samizdat)
- Brikcius E et al., KŠ: Křižovnická škola čistého humoru bez vtipu / Crusader school of pure humour without the joke, 56 p., SČG, Prague 1991
- Eva Petrová, Nová figurace / New Figuration, cat. 104 p., SGVU Litoměřice 1993
- Mezinárodní symposium prostorových forem / International symposium of spatial forms, Ostrava 1993/1994
- Olaf Hanel, Křižovnická škola / The Crusader School, in: Milena Slavická, Marcela Pánková (eds.), Zakázané umění I / Forbidden Art I, Výtvarné umění 1996
- Pavlína Morganová, KŠ / The Crusader School 1999-2000, Gambit Gallery, Prague 2000
- Jan Koblasa, Věra Jirousová (eds.), Šmidrové / Šmidra group, Anthology, 184 p., National Heritage Institute Brno, Fontána, Olomouc 2005
- Jiří Hůla, Křižovnická škola čistého humoru bez vtipu / Crusader school of pure humour without the joke, DOX, Prague 2012
- Duňa Slavíková, Křižovnická škola čistého humoru bez vtipu / Crusader school of pure humour without the joke, Gallery of Modern Art Roudnice nad Labem 2015
- Jan Šícha, S (ne)lidskou tváří?!: 1938-1989 / With (in)human face?!: 1938-1989, 255 p., National Gallery Prague 2018, ISBN 978-80-7035-706-4
- Pavel Ryška, Karikaturisti. Polylegran a obrazový humor 60. let / Cartoonists. Polylegran and pictorial humour of the 1960s, Paseka, Prague 2018 ISBN 978-80-7432-905-0
- Martina Vítková, Markéta Korečková (eds.), O důležitých věcech se nemluví. Společenství ateliéru Karla Nepraše / Important things are not talked about. The Community of Karel Nepraš's Studio, Academy of Fine Arts in Prague 2020, ISBN 978-80-87108-82-6

=== Encyclopedias ===
- Fernand Hazan (ed.), Nouveau dictionnaire de la sculpture moderne, Paris 1970, pp. 227–228
- Malá československá encyklopedie / Small Czechoslovak Encyclopedia (M-Pol), Academia, Prague 1986
- Československý biografický slovník / Czechoslovak Biographical Dictionary, Academia, Prague 1992
- Encyklopedický slovník / Encyclopedic dictionary, Odeon, Prague 1993
- Grafika (Obrazová encyklopedie české grafiky osmdesátých let / Pictorial Encyclopaedia of the Eighties), Středoevropská galerie a nakladatelství, Prague 1993
- Horová Anděla (ed.), Nová encyklopedie českého výtvarného umění / New Encyclopedia of Czech Fine Arts N-Ž, 558 s., Academia, Prague 1995, ISBN 80-200-0522-6
- Všeobecná encyklopedie ve čtyřech svazcích / General encyclopedia in four volumes (vol. 3: m/r), Nakladatelský dům OP, Prague 1997, ISBN 80-85841-35-5
- Kdo byl kdo v našich dějinách 20. století / Who was who in our 20th century history (vol. II. N-Ž), Libri Publishing house, Prague 1999, ISBN 80-85983-64-8
- Velký slovník naučný / The Great Teaching Dictionary (m/ž), Diderot, Prague 1999, ISBN 80-902723-1-2
- Zbyšek Malý (ed.), Slovník českých a slovenských výtvarných umělců / Dictionary of Czech and Slovak Visual Artists 1950-2002, vol. IX, 341 p., Výtvarné centrum Chagall, Ostrava 2002, ISBN 80-86171-14-0
- Benezit Dictionary of Artists (Volume 10: Müller - Pinchetti), en., Éditions Gründ, Paris 2006, ISBN 9782700030808

=== Articles (selection) ===
- Jan Kříž, Estetika divnosti (The Aesthetics of Weirdness), Výtvarné umění 1, 1967, p. 1–13
- Jan Kříž: Karel Nepraš, TerzoOcchio č. 1, Bologna 1975
- Jan Kříž: Il grottesco nell arte ceca contemporanea, TerzoOcchio IX, č. 3, Bologna 1983, p. 18–21
- Radan Wagner: Karel Nepraš - vážná sranda / serious fun, Revue Art 2018, p. 64–71

=== Theses ===
- Jitka Rychlíková, Prezentace výtvarného díla "Karel Nepraš a spol. / Presentation of the artwork "Karel Nepraš et al.", Alternativa - kulturní institut Zlín, Bachelor thesis, UTB, Zlín, 2007 on line
- Petra Forstová, Činnost skupiny Šmidrové v padesátých letech / Activities of the Šmidra Group in the 1950s, Bachelor thesis, FF MUNI, Brno, 2008 on line
- Jitka Bošková, Česká rocková undergroundová scéna / Czech underground rock scene, Bachelor thesis, PedF, ZČU Plzeň 2014 on line
- Blažena Vampolová, Karel Nepraš - Dialogy s absurdnem / Karel Nepraš - Dialogues with the Absurd, Bachelor thesis, FF MUNI, Brno 2015 on line
- Zdislava Ryantová, Prezentace neoficiální české umělecké scény 80. let mimo centrum / Presentation of the unofficial Czech art scene of the 1980s outside the centre, Thesis, FF UK Prague 2016 online

=== External links ===
- Website: Karel Nepraš, Naděžda Plíšková
- Information system abART: Karel Nepraš
- List of works in the Complete Catalogue of the Czech Republic, whose author or subject is Karel Nepraš
- Artmix, Czech TV 2, 2012 (k retrospektivní výstavě DOX / to the retrospective exhibition in DOX), Prague
- Cz. radio Vltava, interview with Karel Nepraš (2001)
- Cz, radio Vltava, k výstavě KN a přátelé / to the exhibition KN and friends, Zlín (2007)
- KN, interview with P. Volf (2002)
- Artlist: Karel Nepraš
