= Postbus =

Public bus service that also delivers mail

A postbus is a public bus service that is operated as part of local mail delivery as a means of providing public transport in rural areas with lower levels of patronage, where a normal bus service would be uneconomic or inefficient. Postbus services are generally run by a public postal delivery company and combine the functions of public transport and mail delivery and collection. A standard passenger fare is payable to the driver or mail carrier.

== History ==
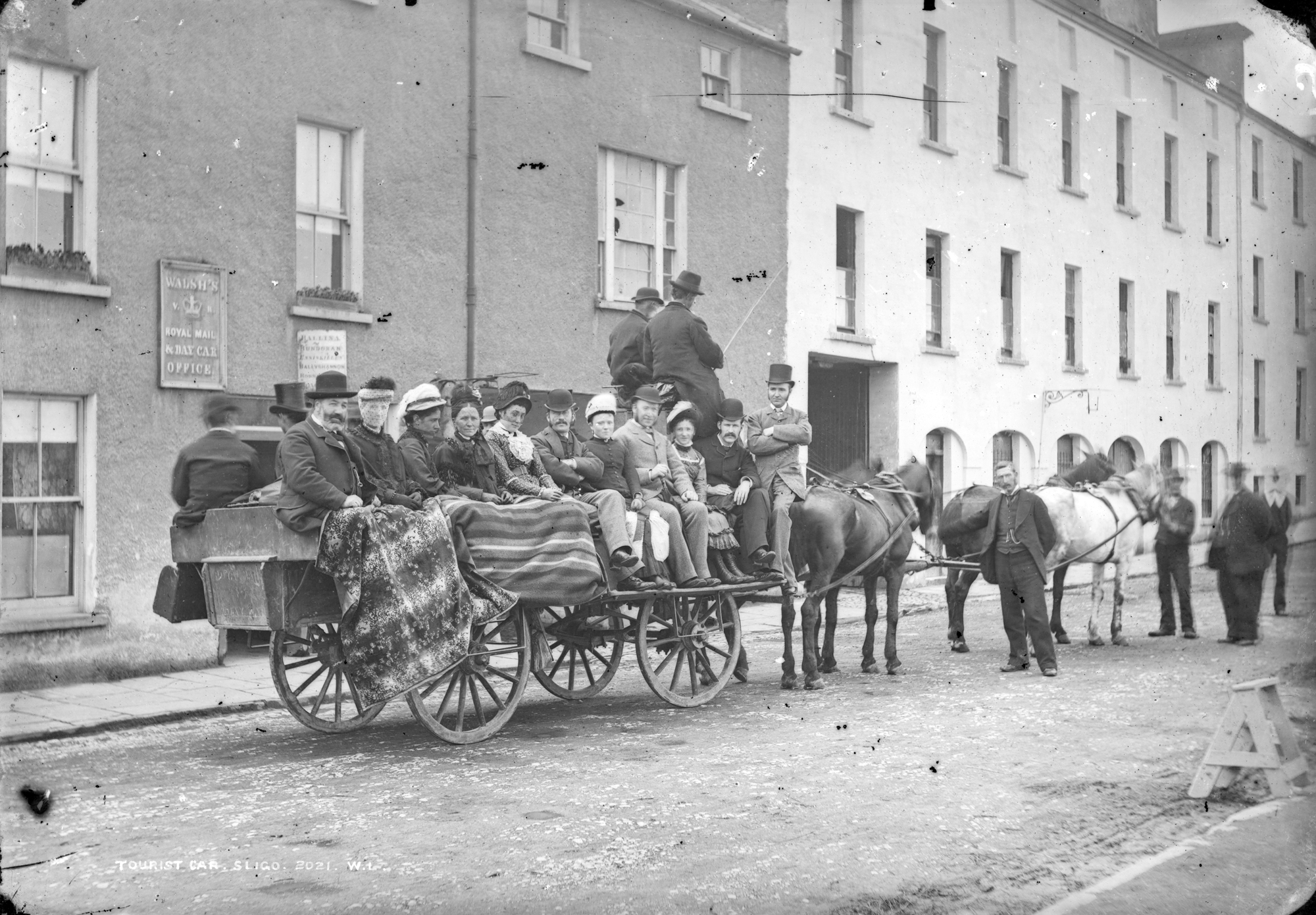
Walsh's Royal Mail and Day Car in Sligo, Ireland, showing a pregenitor of the postbus service as it currently exists

Horse-driven mail coach and public transport services were frequently combined prior to the advent of motorized transport. The travel writer Anthony Lambert describes the concept in Switzerland, "the Swiss postbus system ... evolved from the 19th century mail coach service..." and further that "the Swiss believe ... that the only sensible way to organise public transport services is to achieve the maximum integration between modes." The service became used widely in Europe by the 1960s, though in recent years there has been a progressive separation of services in some countries.

== By country ==
=== Austria ===
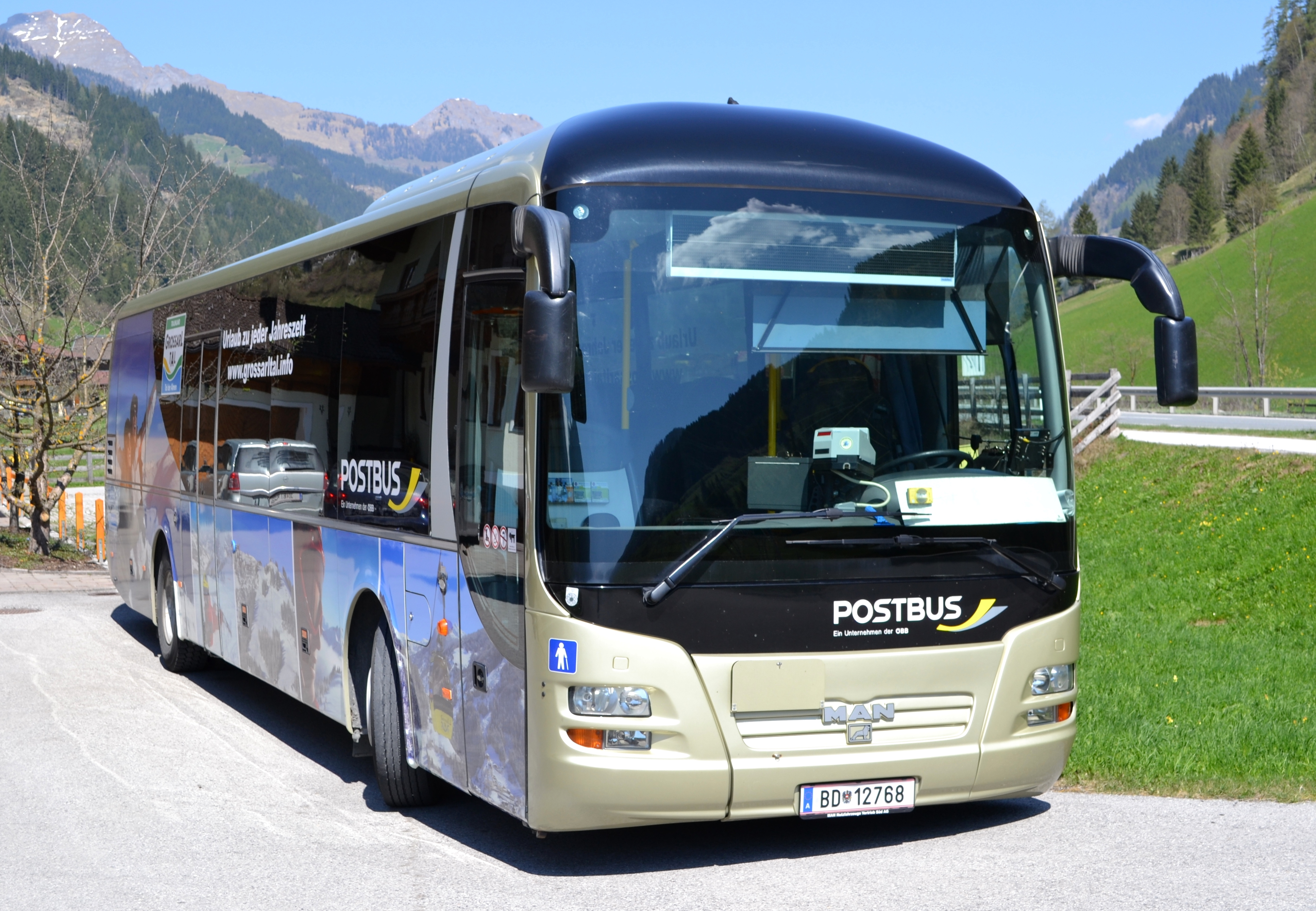
MAN postbus near Salzburg, Austria

In Austria, the postbus system is known as Postbus. From 1907 onwards power-driven vehicles were operated by the Imperial-Royal Post- und Telegraphenverwaltung, gradually replacing the former stagecoach service. In the course of the privatisation of the Austrian Post, the Österreichische Industrieholding sold the postbus branch to the Austrian Federal Railways (ÖBB) group in 2003.

Today the ÖBB-Postbus GmbH is the country's largest bus company serving regional and interurban traffic with about 4000 employees and 2100 buses. The corporation also comprises the ÖBB's former railway bus service (KÖB) as well as the Czech ČSAD Autobusy company in České Budějovice acquired in 2004.

=== Czechoslovakia ===
The first postbus lines in Bohemia started in the days of Austria-Hungary, in 1908. The first lines were Pardubice – Bohdaneč (11 km, 64 minutes) and Pardubice – Holice, other lines came later. In 1914, bus transport in Bohemia, Moravia and Slovakia consisted of 23 lines in all, at which operated 33 postbuses and 13 private buses. During the World War I, bus transport was interrupted, vehicles were requisitioned by the army and rebuild to trucks.

Since 1918, postbus transport continued in Czechoslovakia. The post transport had its main base place at Citadela, a former army depot in Vyšehrad, Prague, and in 1926 it had 216 buses in the whole Czechoslovakia. In 1927, the Citadela base with many equipment and material was burned by fire. The second main base place was built in Vršovice, Prague (currently Veolia Transport resides there). In 1927 the Czechoslovak state railway company ČSD began its state bus lines but the post lines continued. In 1933–1934 state postbus lines were transferred and merged with railway bus lines into ČSD railway company.

=== Finland ===
In 1921, The Finnish Post and Telegraph Authority (Posti- ja lennätinlaitos, now Itella Corporation) started a bus service carrying both mail and passengers in Finnish Lapland from Rovaniemi to Sodankylä and soon all the way to Ivalo in the very northern part of the country. The same year, another postbus route was started in southwestern Finland between Turku and Mynämäki and in 1922 a third service began between the northern city Oulu and Taivalkoski. By 1939 there were over 60 postbus routes around Finland. In addition to that, many private bus companies also carried mail on their buses.

The busiest year for the Finnish Postbus network was 1971, with 222 bus lines around the country run by more than 420 buses famous for their bright orange colour. Then the posts authority decided to concentrate postal transports on trucks, and the postbus services started to decline. In 1999, the remaining postbus lines and vehicles, now organised under a separate company Gold Line Oy, were sold to a private bus company, Koiviston Auto Oy. Gold Line remains Koivisto's subsidiary operating from Rovaniemi.

=== Germany ===
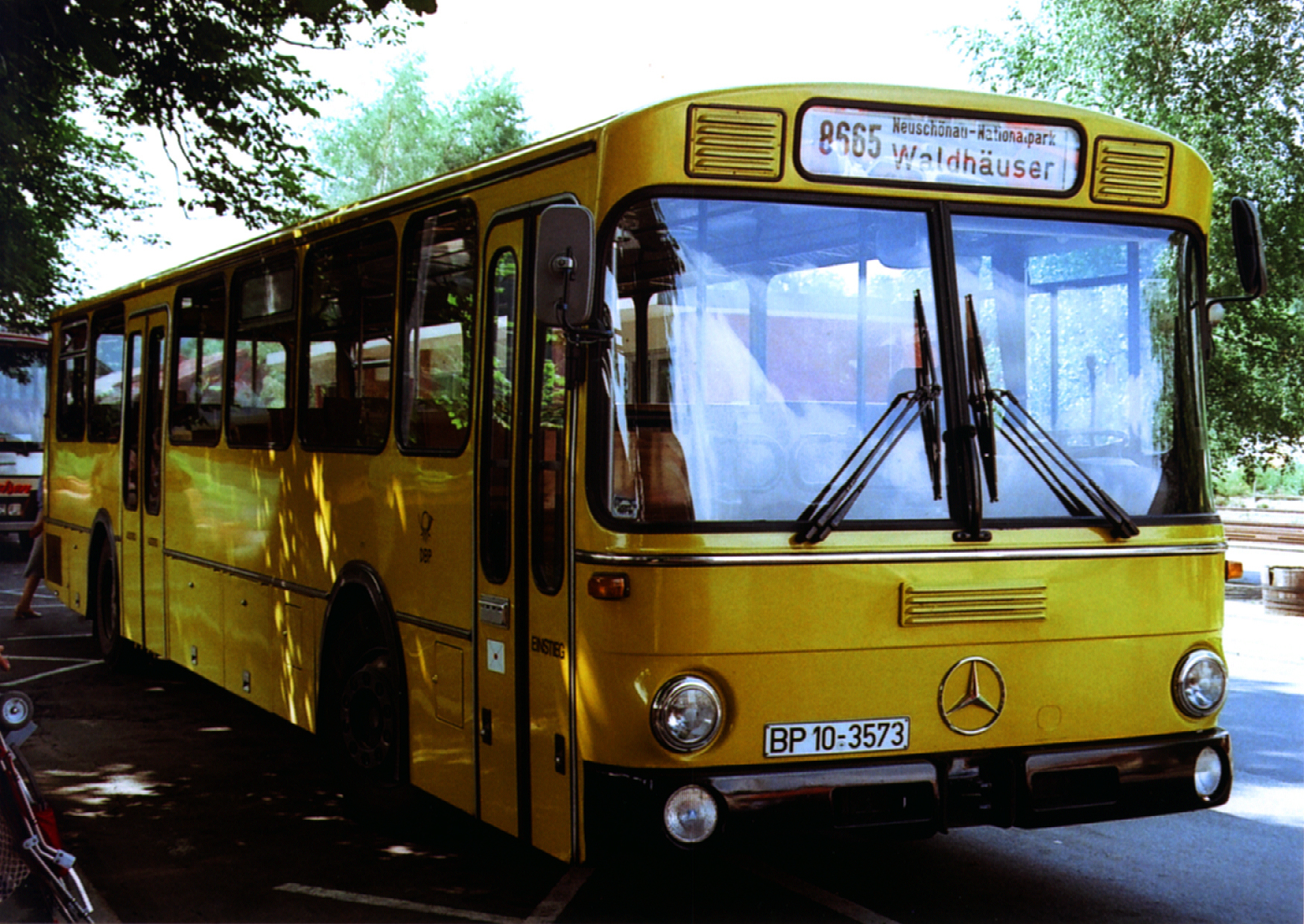
Mercedes-Benz O 307 Postbus in Grafenau, Bavaria, 1982

In Germany, a postbus system for passenger and freight operation, run by the Reichspost authority and its post-war Bundespost successor, existed until May 1985. It was formerly known as Kraftpost, from 1965 as Postreisedienst.

A first postbus route was set up on 1 June 1905 connecting Bad Tölz and Lenggries in Bavaria. The first Reichspost line ran from 16 June 1906 between Friedberg and Ranstadt in Hesse. Soon after it operated numerous bus routes. With mailboxes on board, the buses contributed greatly to open up rural areas in the 1920s and 30s in addition to the Reichsbahn railway lines. While rail was quicker and more convenient, the buses were a low-cost alternative.

After World War II, post bus service was resumed by the Bundespost authority in West Germany, running more than 4,000 vehicles in the mid-1950s. Later years saw a significant decline in demand, with the increasing prosperity of society in the Wirtschaftswunder period and the growing use of the automobile for private transport. Many lines were abolished in the 1970s and 1980s.

In 1971, the Bundespost agreed to build up a joint venture cooperation with the Bundesbahn rail bus network and from 1981, the service was split into regional transport companies under the umbrella of the Bundesbahn authority, running bus lines in major cities and metropolitan areas associated with each other. By 1995, the newly established Bundespost successor, the privatized Deutsche Post stock company, had retired completely from bus service and the yellow vehicles disappeared from public roads. However, there are foreign postbuses in Germany with international scheduled services (e.g. from Austria in the Berchtesgadener Land area and in Oberstdorf; from Switzerland in southern Baden-Württemberg).

In 2013, after a substantial liberalization of the German intercity bus market, Deutsche Post created a Deutsche Post Mobility subsidiary. Initially run in cooperation with the ADAC automobile club it was first branded ADAC Postbus. It connected several large cities nationally and internationally. Deutsche Post DHL Group sold its long-distance bus unit, Postbus, to the German market leader Flixbus on 3 August 2016.

=== Ireland ===
In July 1982, the Minister for Posts and Telegraphs, John Wilson, initiated a postbus service in County Clare, one of the most scenic areas of Ireland. Ennis post office was the start of the 68-mile route around the county. It ran twice on weekdays at 7 a.m. and 3 p.m. carrying mail and passengers to towns like Kilfenora and Lisdoonvarna with the postman-cum-driver. The bus was originally in an orange and black livery but in 1984 changed to a green livery when An Post became a state-owned postal service provider instead of being an Irish government department.

Passengers were accommodated on a first come first served basis in the small bus and paid an average fee of £5. Soon after its introduction tourists discovered the postbus that took them through the breath-taking County Clare scenery to visit The Burren and the Cliffs of Moher.

The postbus service was terminated in September 2004 and was never extended to other parts of the country. An Post axed the service for economic reason and claimed the bus was too old and beyond repair. Clare council member, Martin Lafferty, accused An Post of allowing the service to deteriorate so they could axe it.

=== Sweden ===
In some parts of rural Sweden, especially the sparsely populated northern inland, mail is delivered by bus. Formerly this service was handled by the postal service themselves in their own buses and livery. As Postens Diligenstrafik (lit. the Post's stagecoach traffic) between the years 1923–1991. In 1991 this became a part of the Swebus company. Nowadays it is handled by the local councils’ own public transportation buses by appointment of the postal service. Due to deregulation since the early 1990s, some lines are run as public service obligations by private contractors. In addition to that there is an association of local bus companies called Bussgods which works as a courier for bulkier goods between bus stops and/or terminals. Unlike the British postbuses these vehicles are built on full-size coaches chassis with a box body and a tail lift in the rear end to accommodate heavier goods and even pallets sent along with the mail. This unusual truck/bus combination is nicknamed "Skvader".

=== Switzerland ===
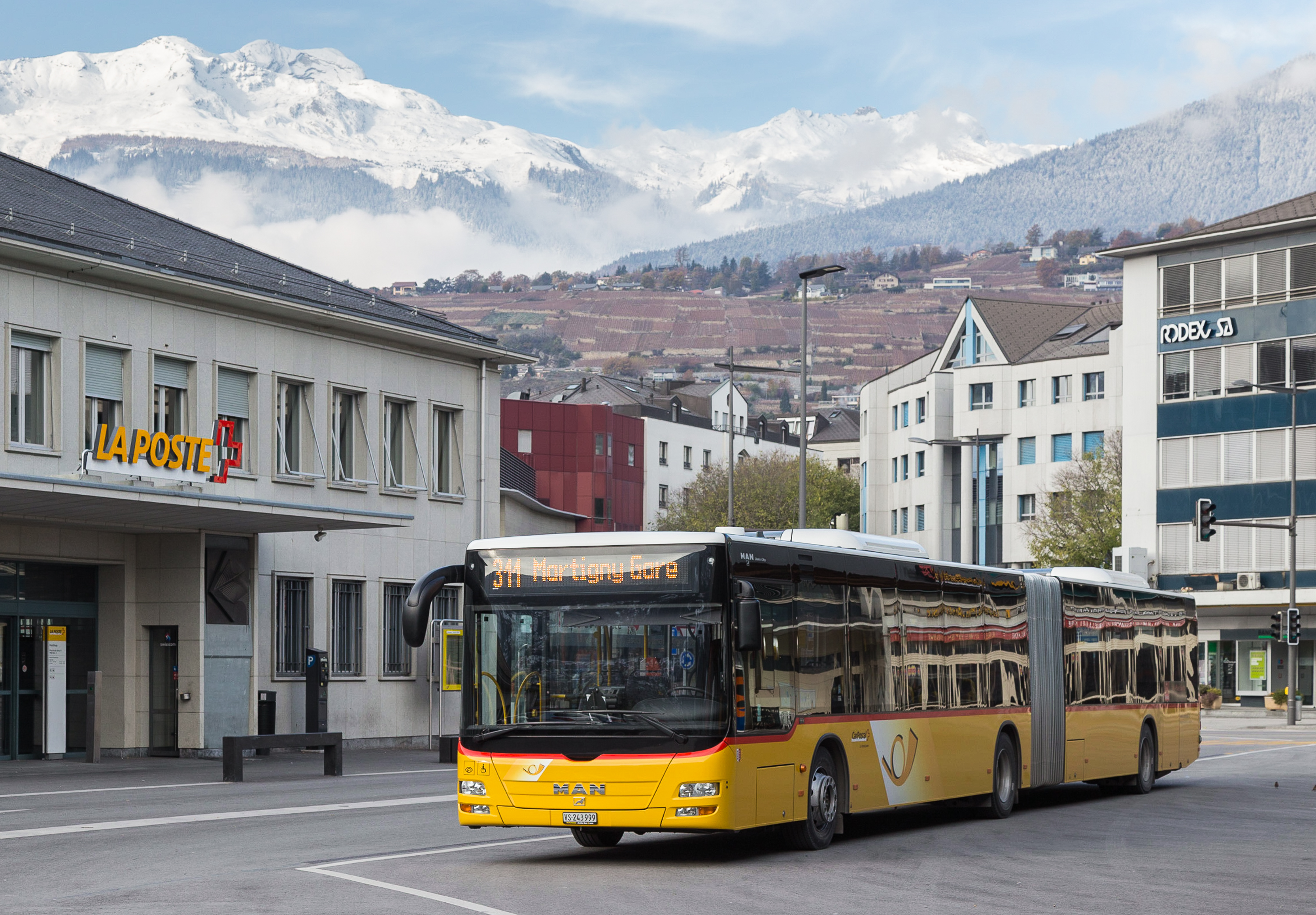
PostAuto in Sion

In Switzerland, the postbus system is known as Postauto in German, Car postal in French and Autopostale in Italian. Although the combination of mail and passenger transportation had been self-evident in the past, the needs of each diverged towards the end of the twentieth century, when the conveyance of parcels was progressively separated from public transportation. This was also so on private bus and rail lines. This division became official with the conversion of Swiss PostBus Ltd into an independent subsidiary of the Swiss Post. The company operates 869 bus lines with 2,193 buses in Switzerland, transporting over 140 million passengers annually on its 11,869 km long network.

=== United Kingdom ===
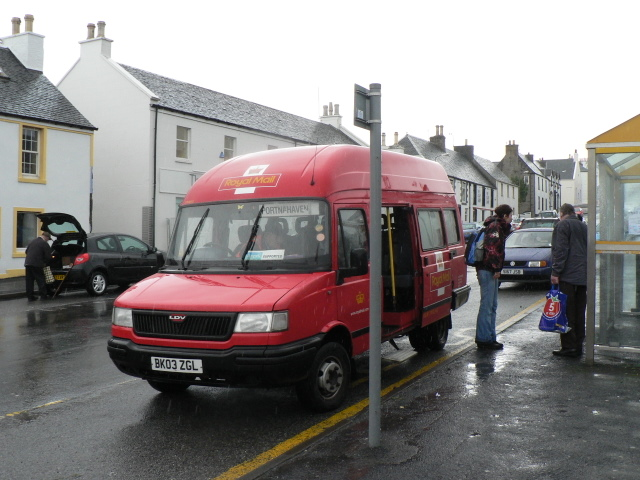
LDV Convoy Royal Mail post bus in Bowmore in 2008

In the United Kingdom postbus services by Royal Mail began in 1967 to replace rapidly declining local bus and rail services in rural areas and provide a community service. In 2006 more than 200 services were operated by Royal Mail, often only once or twice a day but in some areas the only form of public transport available. Key areas included the Yorkshire Dales and South West Scotland.

In April 2009 the Royal Mail ended its postbus services in much of the Scottish Highlands and Islands region. Five "unprofitable" routes were cancelled. The move proved very unpopular with campaigners. Discussions between the Highland Council and Royal Mail broke down. The services were subsequently replaced by a service operated by the Stagecoach Group.

In August 2017 Royal Mail ran its last Tongue to Lairg postbus.
