= Paulina Skavova =

Czech sculptor (born 1976)

Acad. sculptor Paulina Skavova
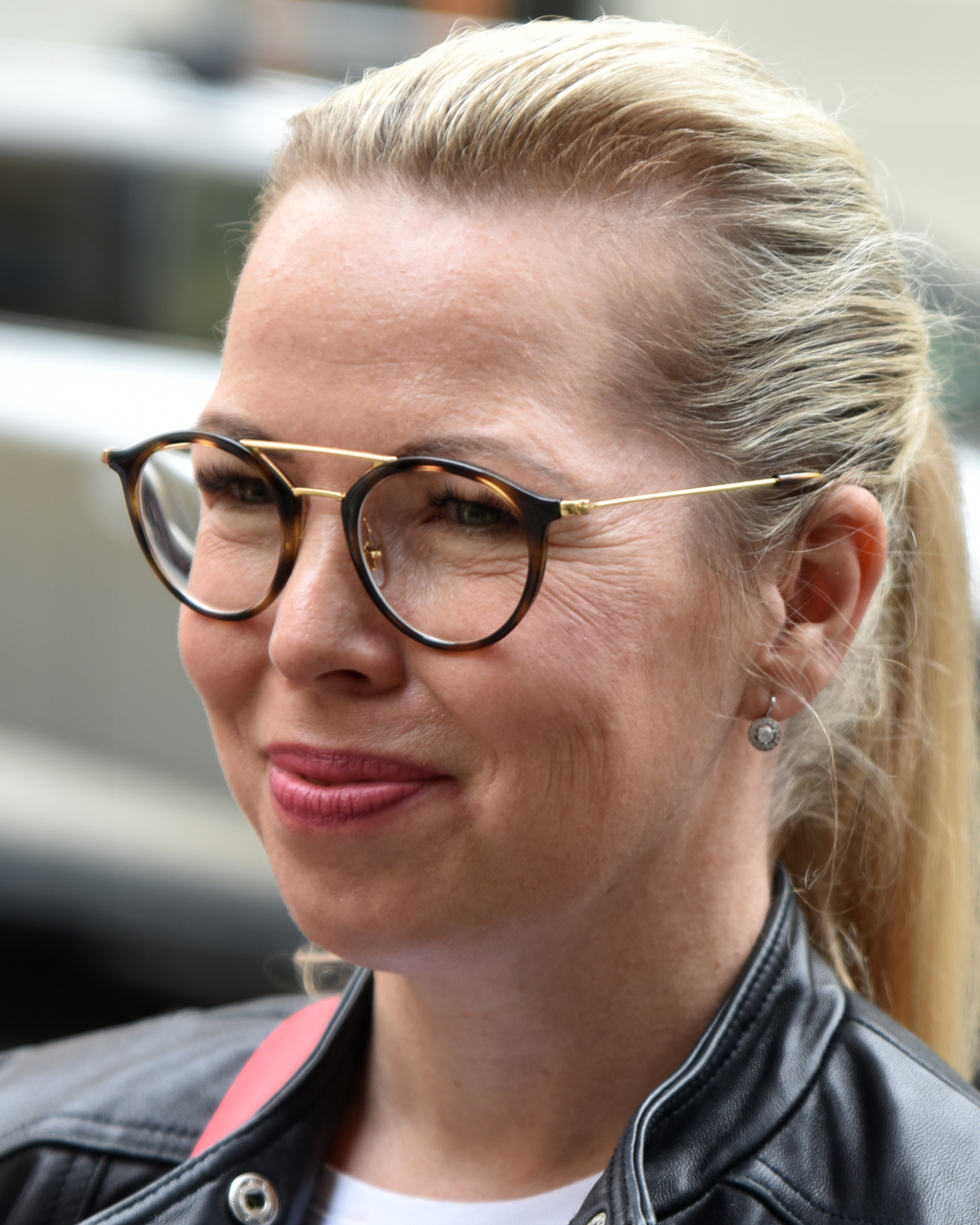
- Paulina Skavova (2020)
- Born: 8 November 1976 (age 49); Trutnov, Czechoslovakia
- Education: Academy of Fine Arts, Prague
- Known for: sculptor, scenographer, conceptual artist
- Awards: Annual Award of the City of Hradec Králové
- Website: www.paulinaskavova.cz

Paulina Skavova or Paulina Skavová (born 8 November 1976) is a Czech sculptor, scenographer and conceptual artist.

== Life ==
Paulina Skavova was born in Trutnov. She graduated from the Trutnov High school (1991–1995) and spent two years at the Secondary School of Stonemasonery and Sculpture in Hořice (1995–1997). During the entrance exams to the Academy of Fine Arts in Prague, she was chosen by Professor Karel Nepraš for his studio, with whom she studied until his death (2002). In 2001 she received the studio prize of the Academy of Fine Arts in Prague and in 2002 the Jana Rybářová Prize, Fondazione Europea Margherita, Italy. In 1999 she completed an Erasmus study stay in Helsinki, in 2002 a scholarship at the Egon Schiele Art Centrum in Český Krumlov. She completed her studies at the Milan Knížák Studio of Intermedia in 2003.

In 2003, she received a Swiss state scholarship and completed postgraduate studies at the Lucerne School of Art and Design (2003-2004). In 2004–2005, she was an assistant at the graphic design school of Prof. Vladimír Kokola at the Academy of Fine Arts. She spent three months on a study stay in Acapulco in 2008.

Thanks to her superior linguistic skills, Paulina earned money for her studies by guiding at the hospital in Kuks, where she had the opportunity to study closely the famous collection of Baroque sculptures by Matthias Bernard Braun, their scenic, theatrical, expressive, attention to detail and descriptive qualities. In addition, she got to know the Baroque pharmacy intimately, and in the library she studied old prescriptions and writings related to the Order of Saint Hubert.

From 2010 to 2020, she curated exhibitions at the UFFO Social Centre in Trutnov. From 2020, she works for the Aleš South Bohemian Gallery as head of the marketing and production department and public relations. She lives and works in Novosedly and since 1998 has been working on casting sculptures in bronze with the art foundry in Horní Kalná. In cooperation with Petr Seifert and the company G1 Glass Art Studio she began to create large-scale relief portraits in fused glass, for example of Miloš Havel for Barrandov Studios or Ignaz Ginzkey for Vratislavice. Since 2009, she has collaborated with film architect Ondřej Nekvasil and has already created around 20 projects for film.

Working together with Jiří Sozanský led her to boxing, which inspired her to create feather-covered boxing gloves or a portrait of boxer Mike Tyson. She also spends her free time horse riding and occasional sport shooting, which her husband Petr Zvolánek does professionally.

== Work ==
Some of her early works, created during her studies at the Academy, had a strong existential subtext (Birds, 1998, Eye, 1999, Ark of the Covenant, 2000, Lamp, 2002), but Paulina Skavová also adopted her professor's distinctive ironic detachment and unkind humour, creating the installation Monument on Mount Blaník (2002), conceived as a persiflage of national myth, and the installation Bank Robbery (2002), as a training ground for bank robbers. After graduating, she developed the tradition of figurative sculpture in her own way. Thanks to the free atmosphere in Karel Nepraš's studio, her works straddle the line between sculpture and concept and are characterized by both playfulness and consistency. She does not accept a narrow definition of sculpture, object and installation and enlivens the serious modelling in her free work with wit and exaggeration. Some of her favourite sculptors include Alina Szapocznikow, Méret Oppenheim and Sarah Lucas. She has collaborated on sculptures by other sculptors (The Fighter, Jiří Sozanský, 2008, Equestrian statue of T.G. Masaryk, Petr Novák, 2009).

Skavová's portrait work includes commemorative plaques (Radovan Lukavský, 2013, General Josef Mašín, 2016, Bishop Stanislav Krátký, 2016) and free-standing sculptures (Antonín Rückl, 2010, bust of Dr. Štastný, 2011, statue of Frank Sidebottom, 2013). She conceived the bust of boxer Mike Tyson (2012) as a personality with sparkle and detachment, sure of his superiority, a bit like the genie from Aladdin's lamp. Figures created as commissions for private collectors include portraits (Offenburg, 2004, Porcelain Portraits of Children, De Louwerte Family, Portraits of Children, Madelaine and Gian Elia, Rohner-Erni Family Winery, Switzerland, 2005), classical female nudes (Bathroom, 2013, Seated, 2014) and stylized sculptures intended for the outdoors (Melancholia, 2013).

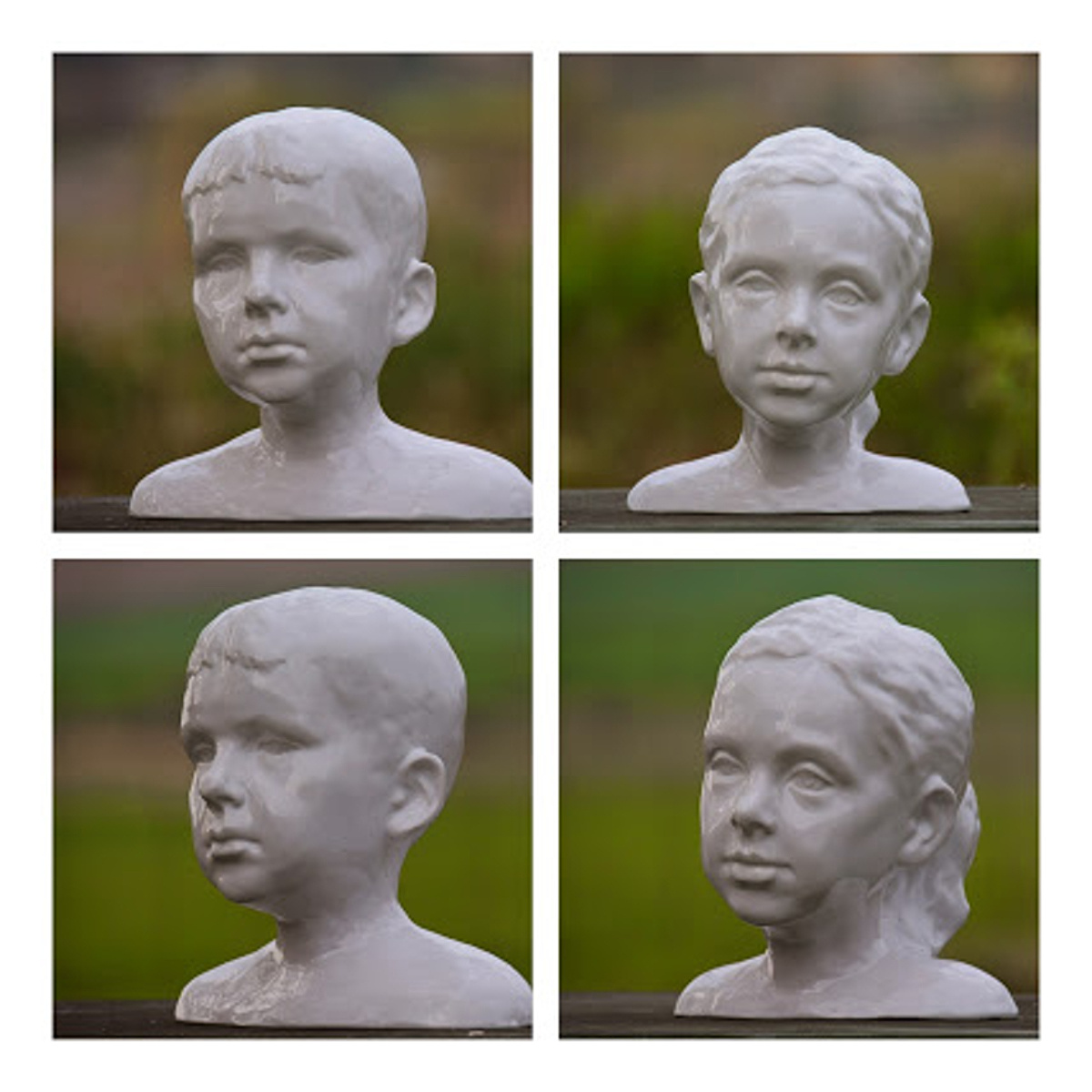
Portraits of children, porcelain, 2005

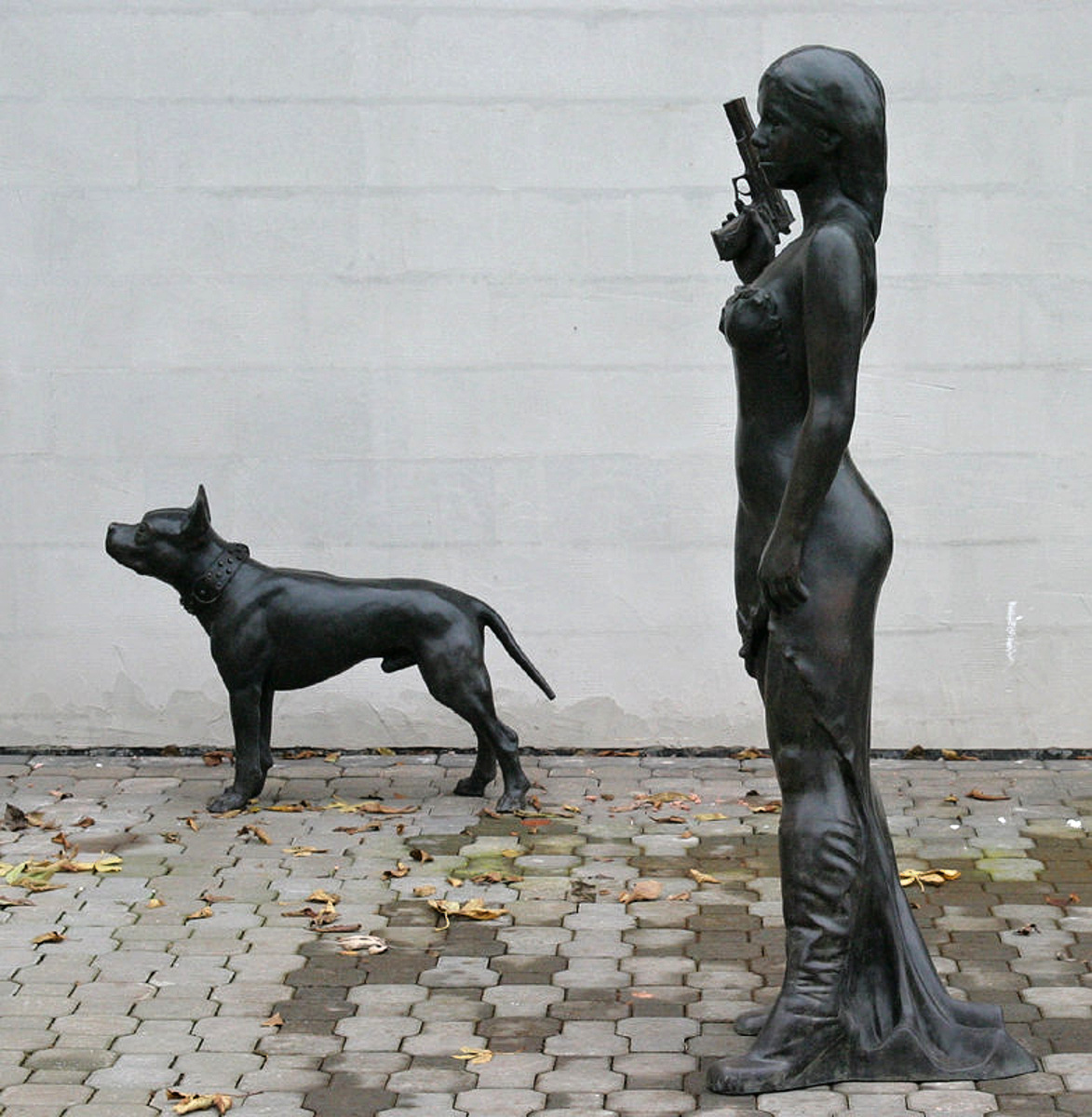
Gunwoman and Tyson, 2008

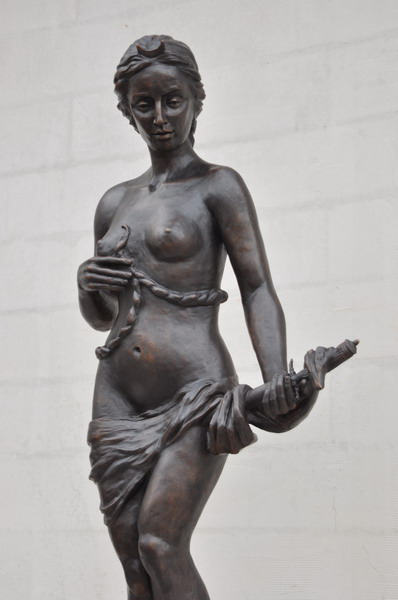
Diana, detail, 2010

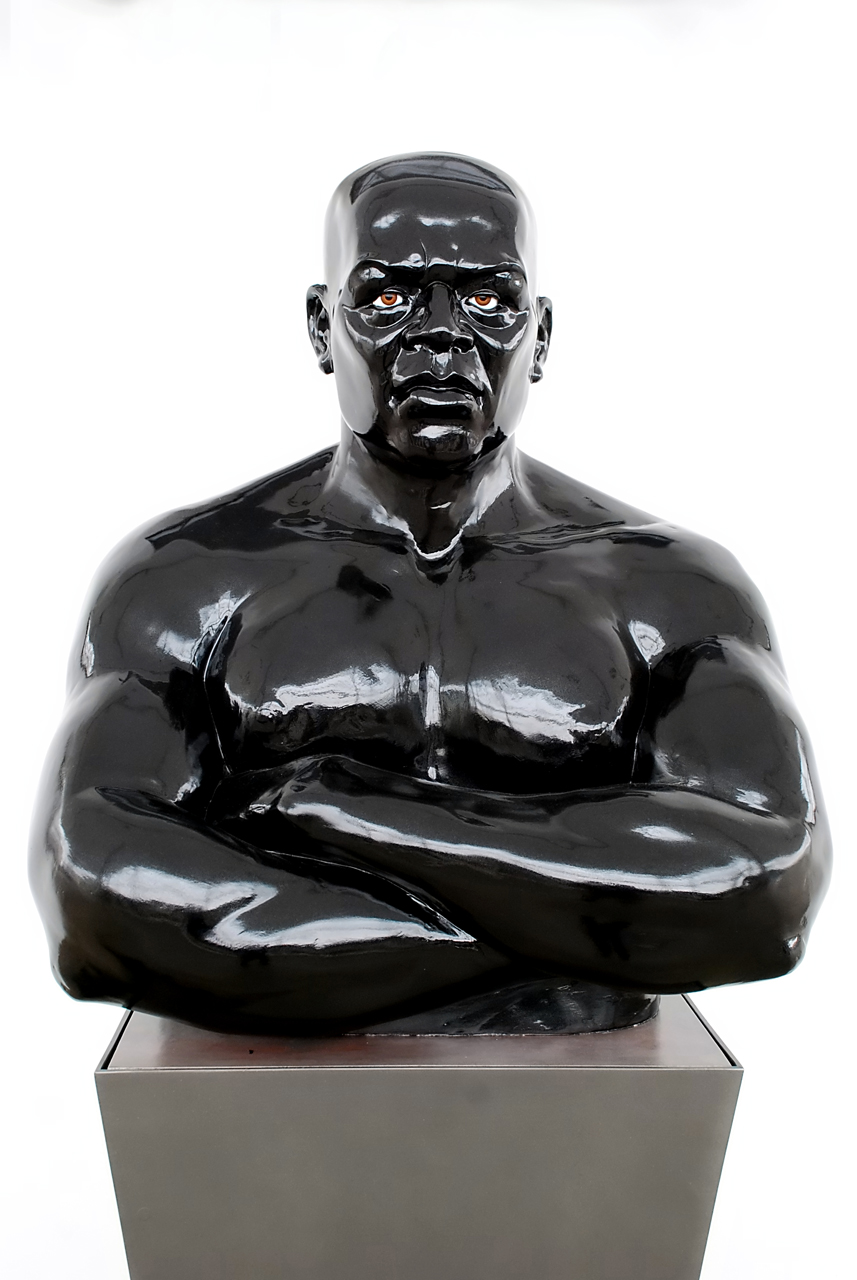
Mike Tyson, 2012

Her animal figures are not mere copies of living models. Deer (2016) has the grandeur and power of a symbol dedicated to Artemis, the goddess of the hunt; it is a personification of the sun and an apparition of St. Hubert and St. Eustace. The statue of the dog Tyson (2007) expresses the dogged nature of the fighting breed, the Bavarian Mountain Hound (2011) the astuteness and intelligence of the hunting dog. Skavova is the author of the monument to the legendary hardy thoroughbred horse breed Akhal Teke for Moscow as well as the statue of the mare Farba (2014). A light-hearted reference to Greek mythology is her female paraphrase of the mythical animal (Female Centaur, 2014).

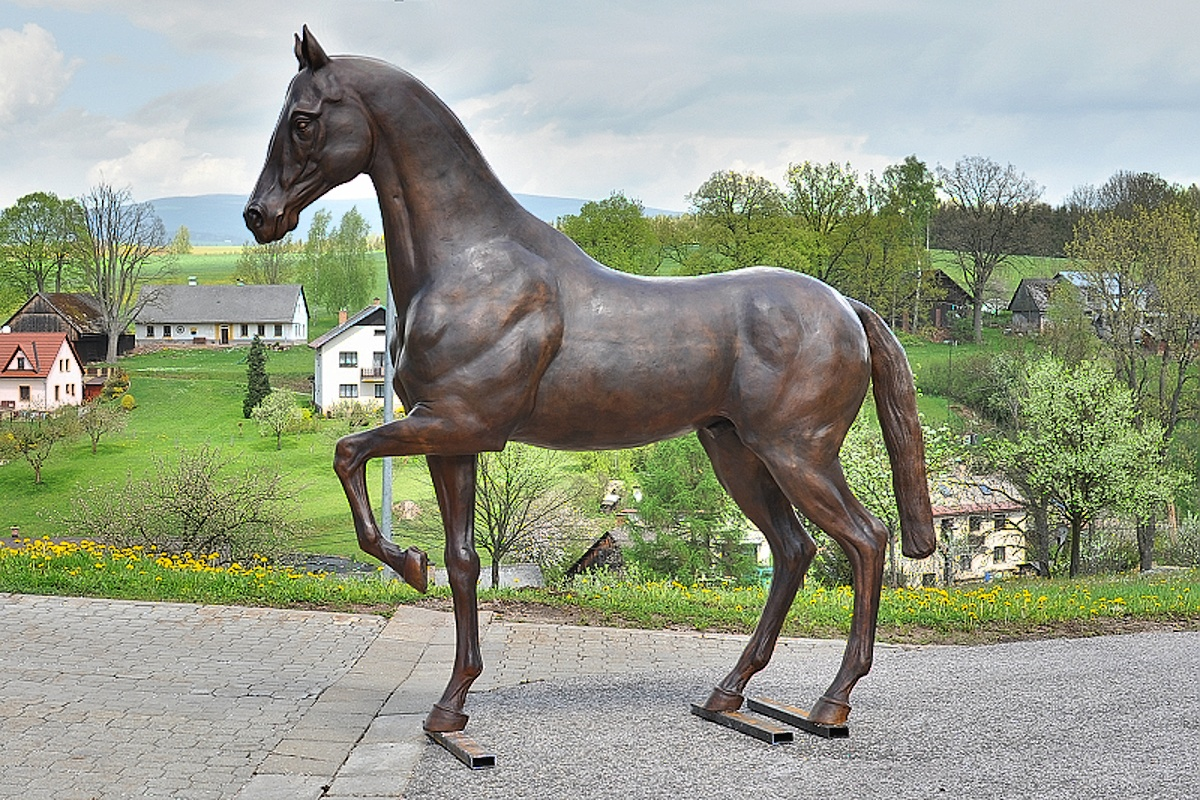
Akhal-Teke, bronze, 2015

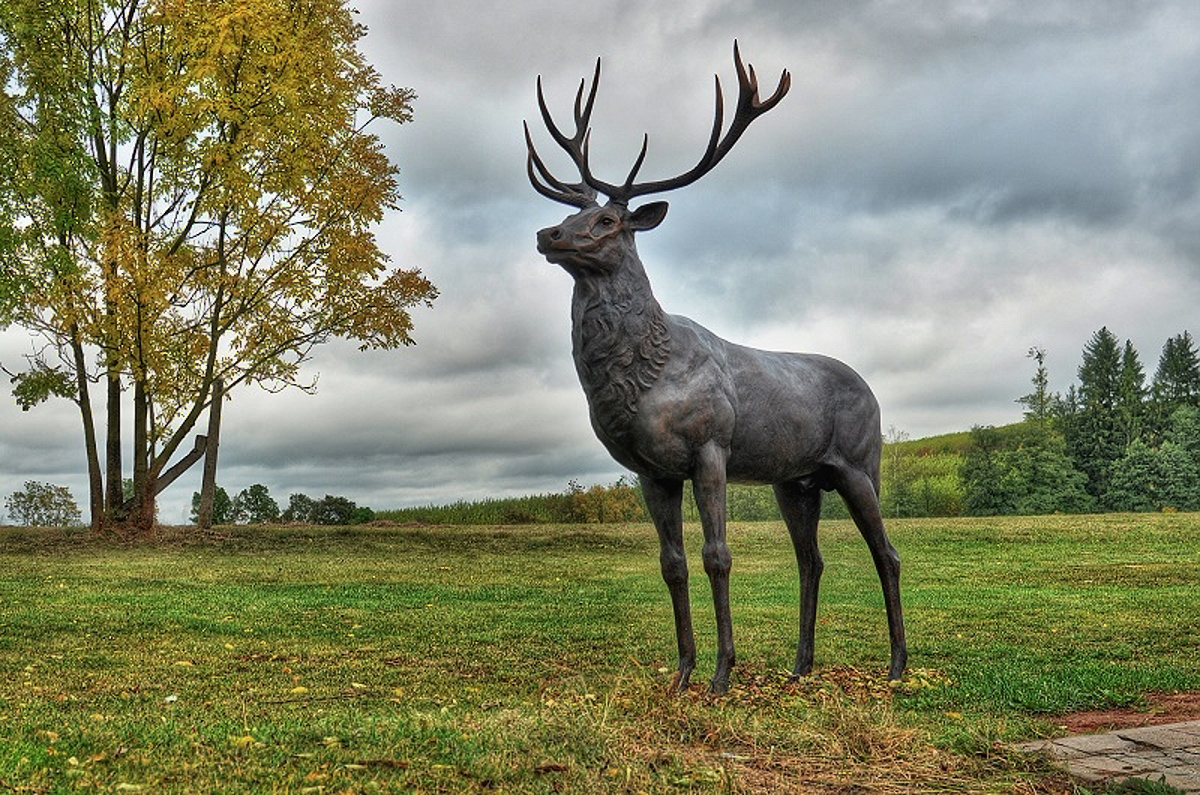
Deer, bronze, 2016

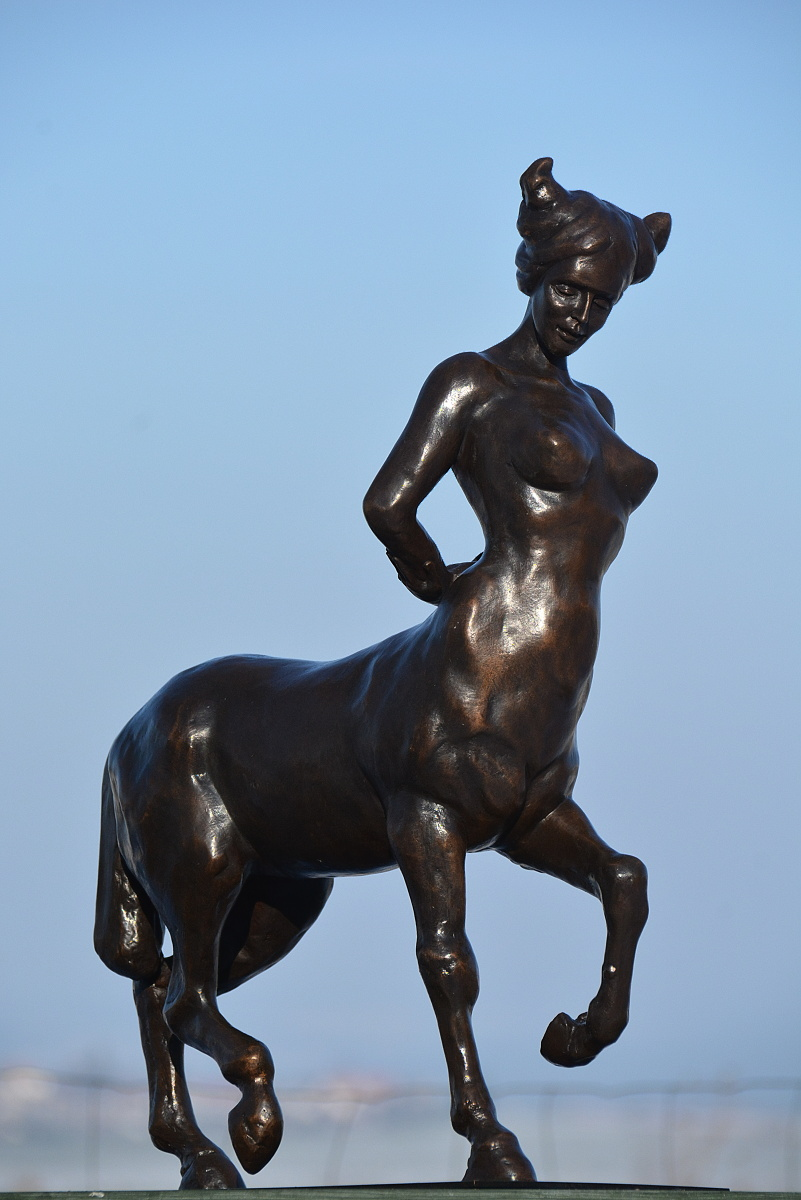
Female Centaur, bronze, 2015

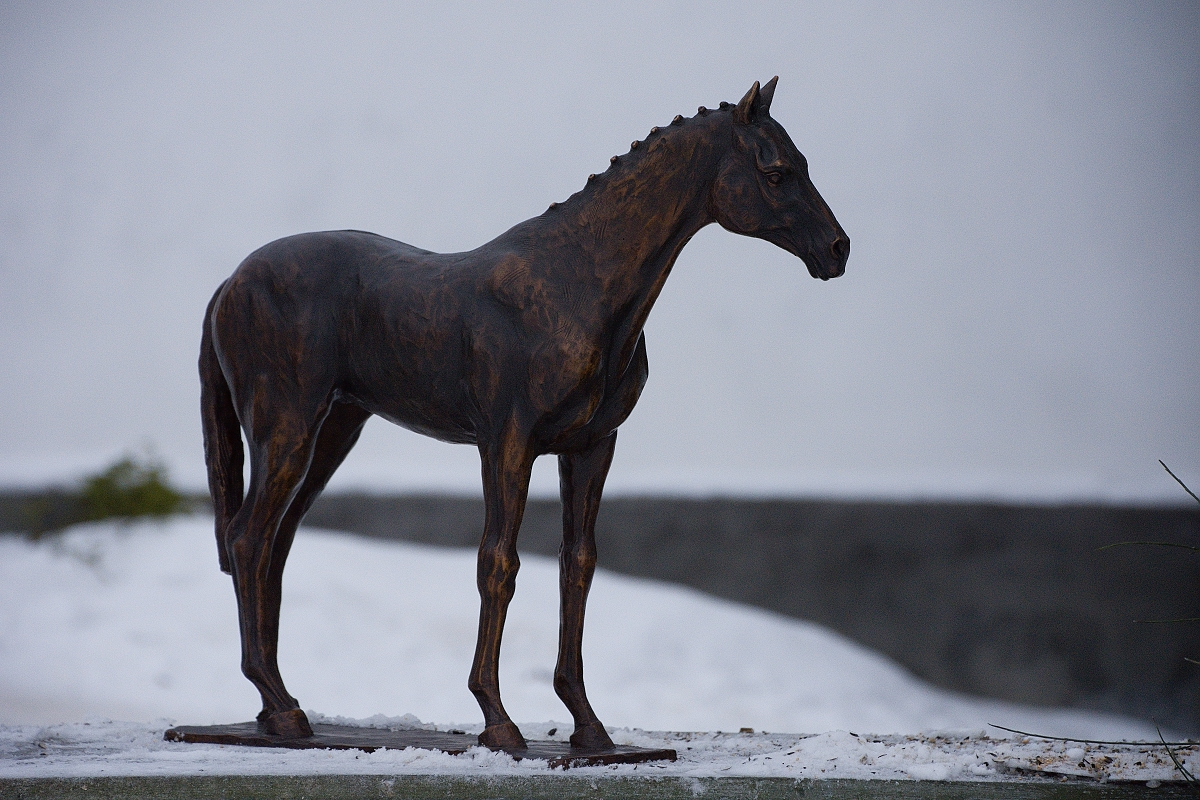
Farba, bronze, 2017

In the restoration of some monuments she has demonstrated her sculptural sensitivity to classical works. According to surviving documentation, she recreated a sculpture of an eagle stolen from the monument to the 6th Battalion of Field hunters, who died in the Battle of Náchod in 1866, in Václavice (2016), sculptures of permoniks (a demon inhabiting and guarding mines in Czech and Slovak folklore) for a fountain in Trutnov (2015) or Emil Schwantner's sculptural Dance of Death (2017) for the World War I memorial in Trutnov Park, which was destroyed during the Nazi occupation. In 2018, Paulina Skavová created a new statue of the legionnaire Jan Gayer for the restoration of the monument to the fallen legionnaries of the 4th Rifle Regiment of Prokop the Great in Hradec Králové. The memorial won the Annual Award of the City of Hradec Králové as the Event of the Year 2018. She proved her originality and seriousness in the treatment of the sacral theme when she won the commission for the statue of the Crucified Christ, which she worked on for three years. The bronze statue of Christ replaced the original old cross in the neighbourhood of the church in Bohdaneč.

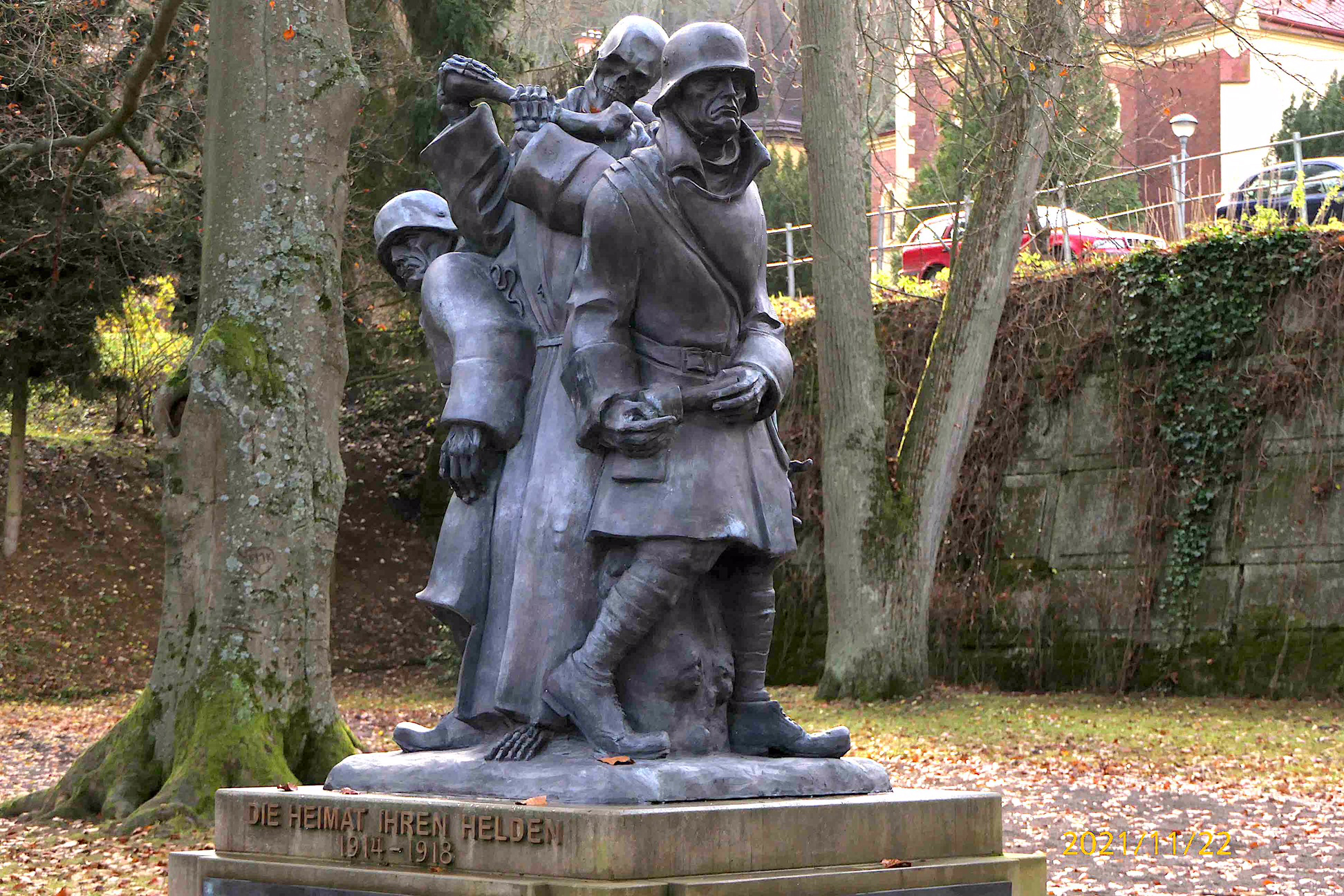
New realization of the destroyed sculpture Dance of Death by Emil Schwantner, Trutnov (2017)

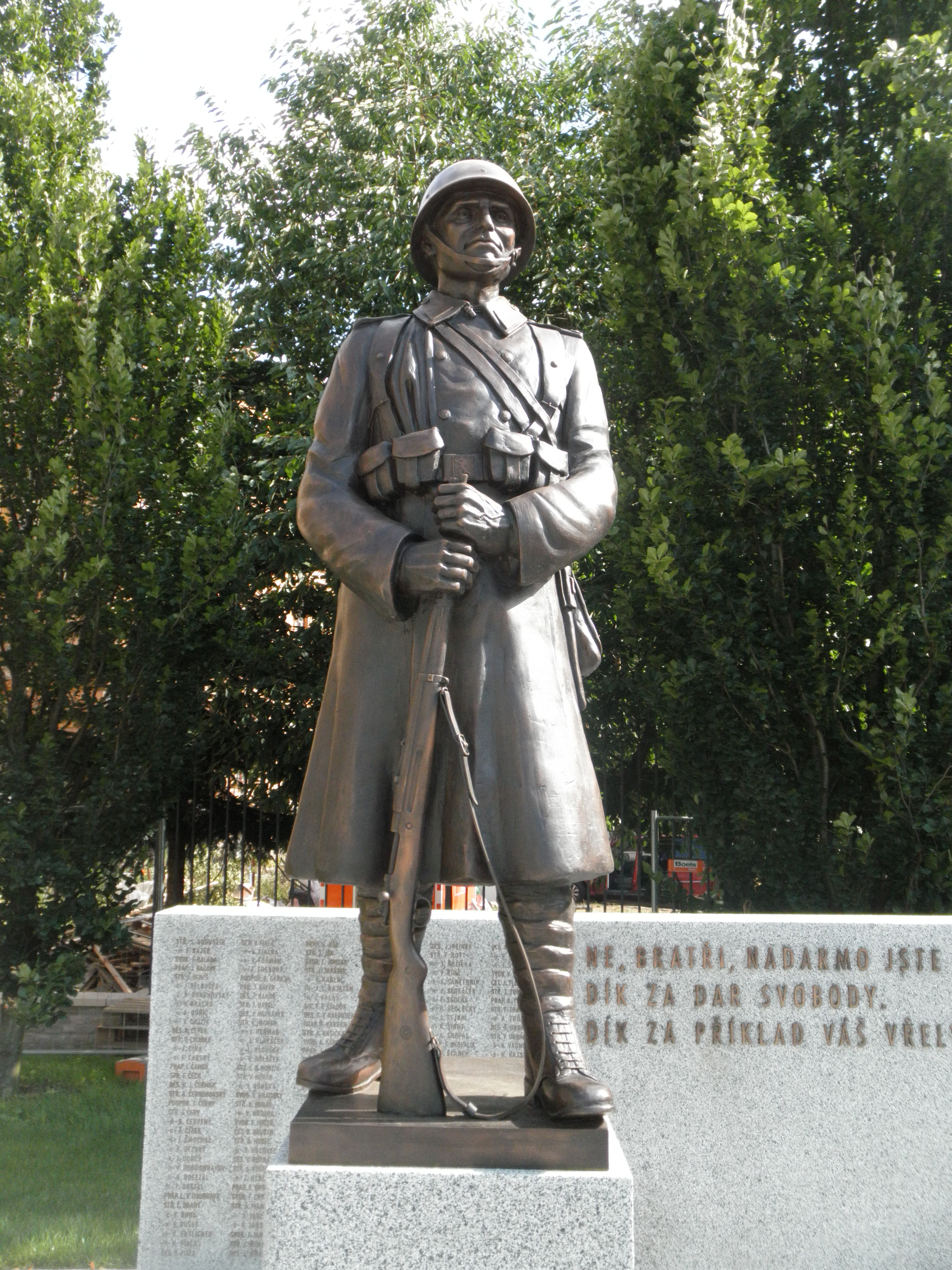
Statue of legionnaire Jan Gayer, Hradec Králové (2018)

Skavová's works are visually strong, emotionally charged, often provocative, ironically coloured, imbued with contrasting and ambiguous contents. Highlighted feminine beauty and sex appeal combined with power and brutality mixes a strange cocktail that tastes at once beautiful and monstrous. She is able to create ironic self-stylization (Paulina and Tyson, 2011), referring to emancipated female film heroines (Pistol Girl, 2008), repulsive female types (Fatty, 2011) and classic sculptural works (Diana, 2010, Venus, 2011).

Often her subjects are gendered and defiantly eroticized - for example, a series of half-figures of women adorned with antelope horns and arranged as trophies (Goat Woman, 2012, Goat Woman, 2013, Oryx Antelope, 2013, Hartebeest Antelope, 2013, Mouflon Woman, 2013), or a group of kneeling Snow White and the Seven Dwarfs (2012). The model of the dwarf and also of Vilímek Ostrovský is a particular boy from Kladno. Snow White, conceived as a rocking horse, is an erotically themed object, but also a reaction to the gender-nonconforming work of British pop-artist Allen Jones, who made various kinds of utilitarian furniture, a table, a chair or a wardrobe, out of a female object.

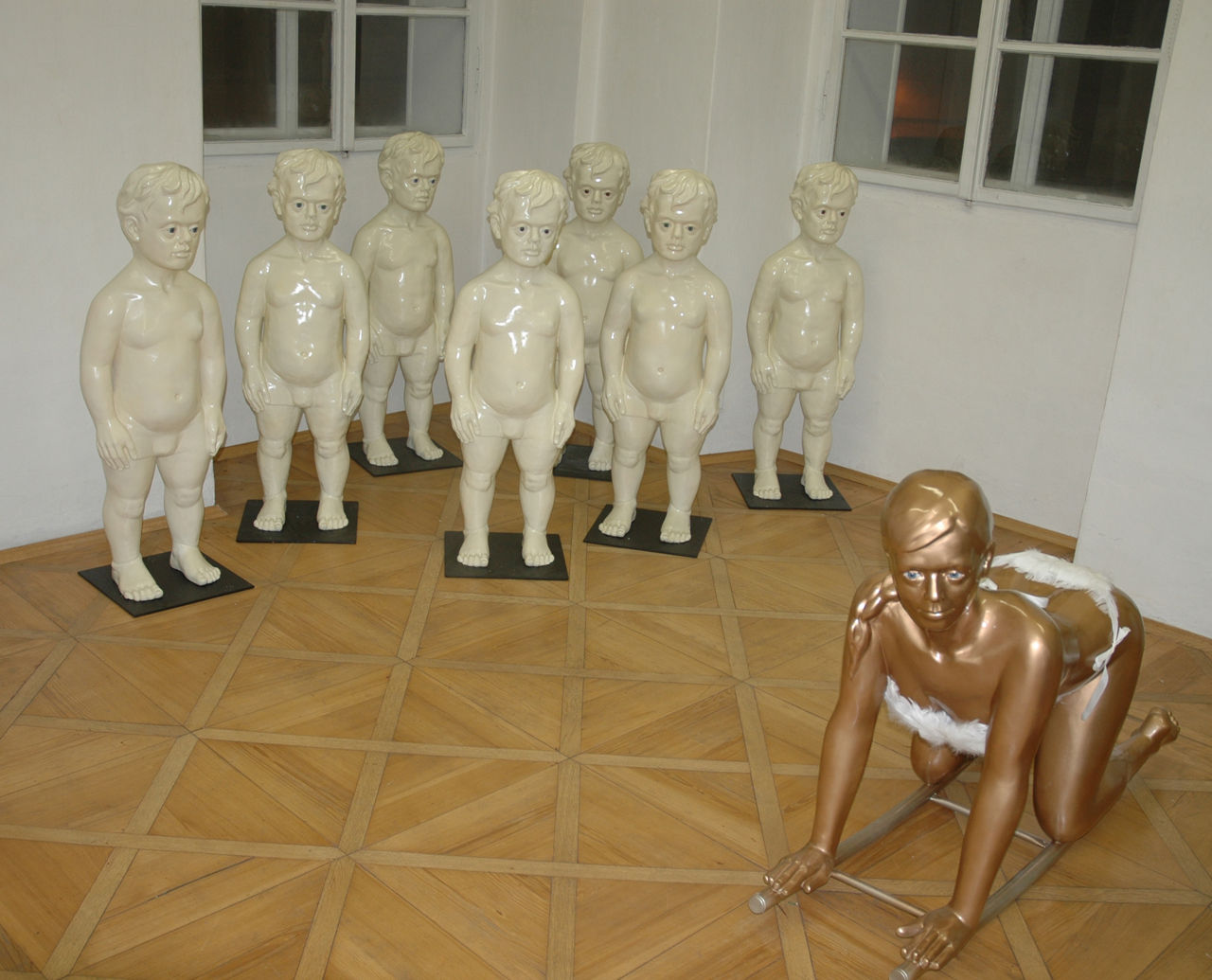
Seven Dwarfs, The Snow White, 2010

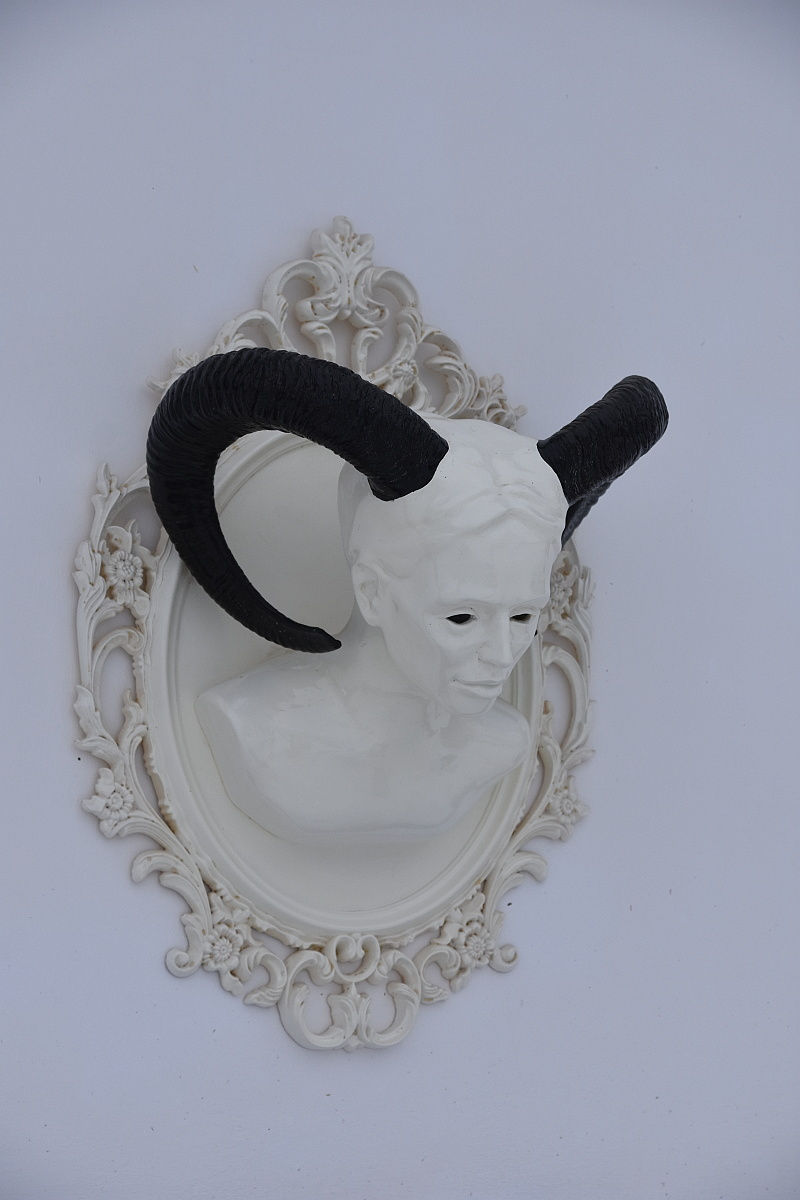
Mouflon Woman, 2013

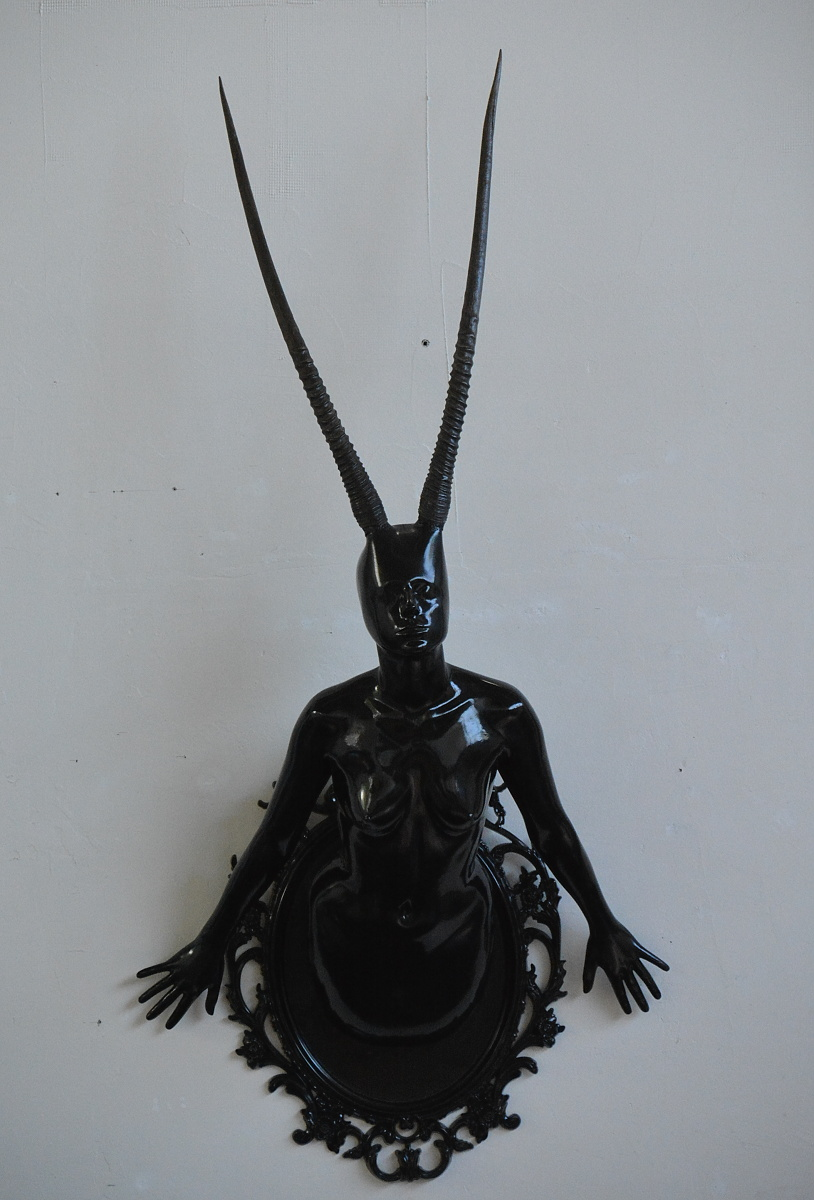
Oryx Antelope, 2014

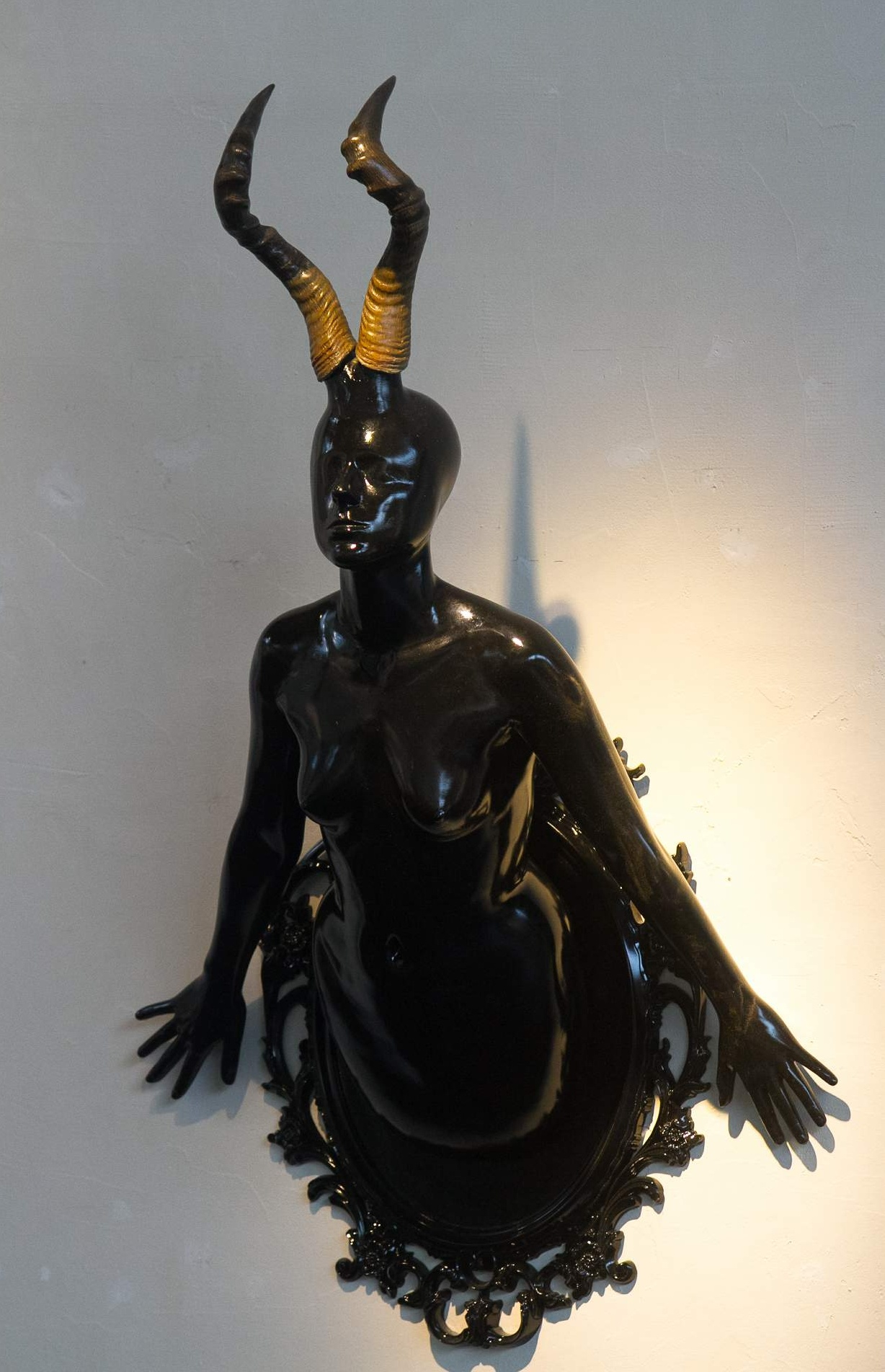
Hartebeest, 2014

The Underwear collection, inspired by the work of Méret Oppenheim, is playfully erotic female underwear made from feathers, fur and parts of wings. Sozansky's feather-covered boxing gloves seemingly draw on a similar poetics to Méret Oppenheim's famous surrealist cup, but in fact contain more of the detachment and sense of humour of her professor Karel Nepraš.

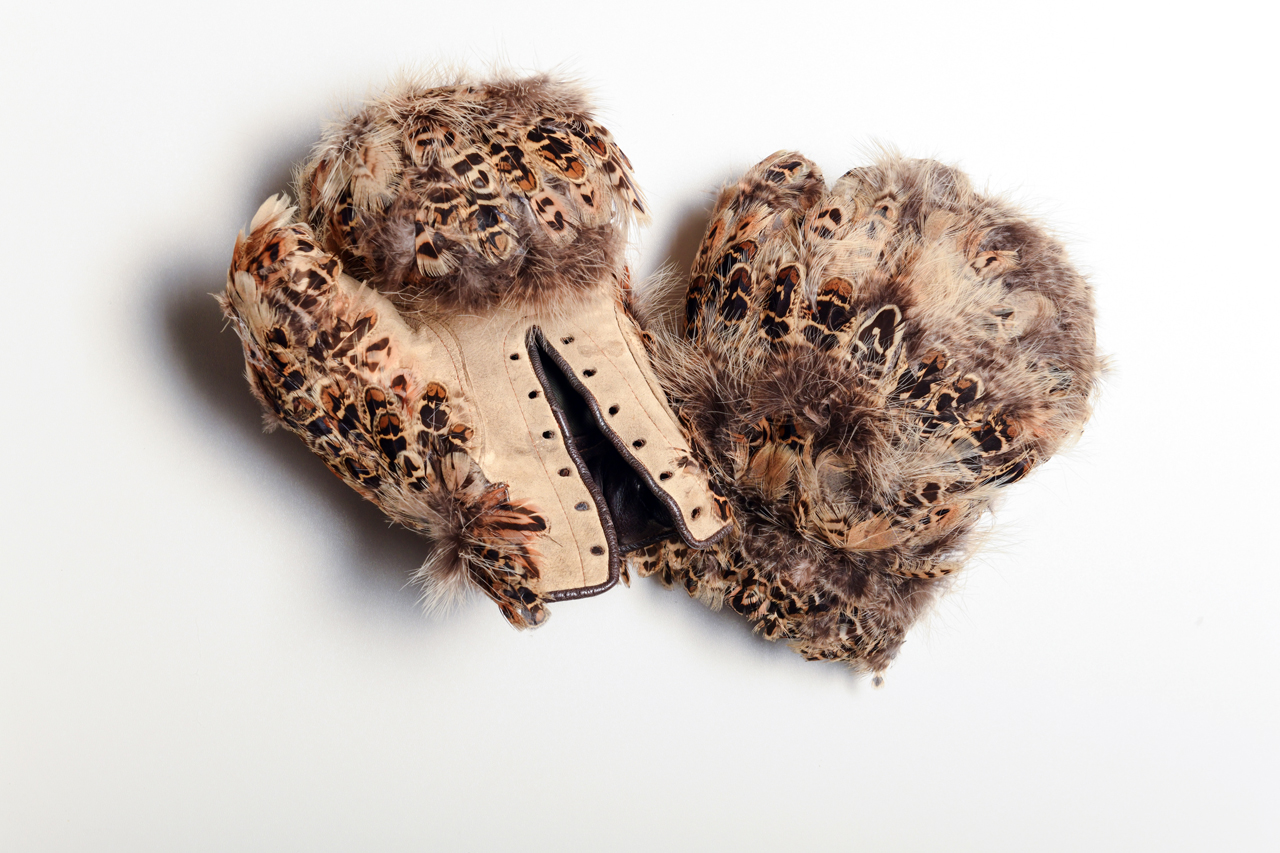
Boxing gloves I (2019)

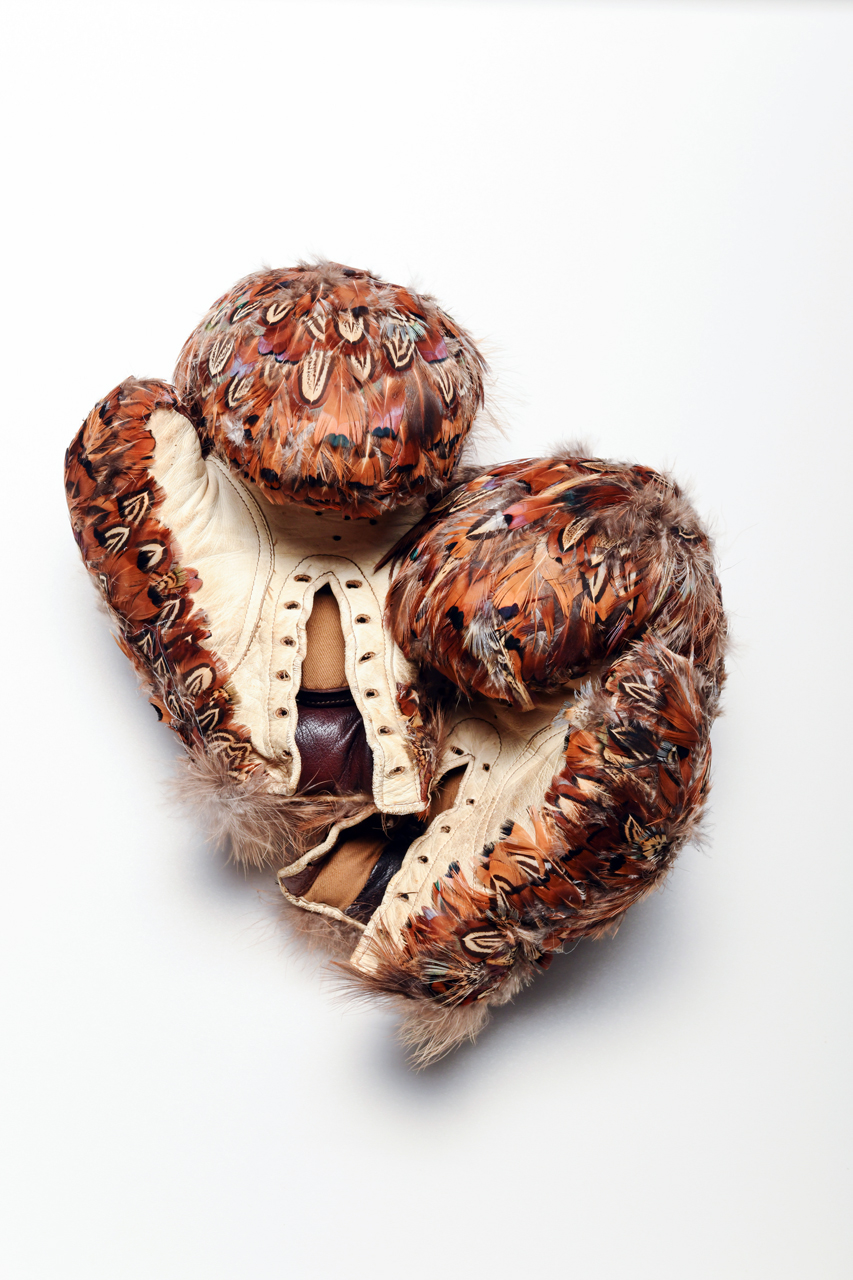
Boxing gloves II (2019)

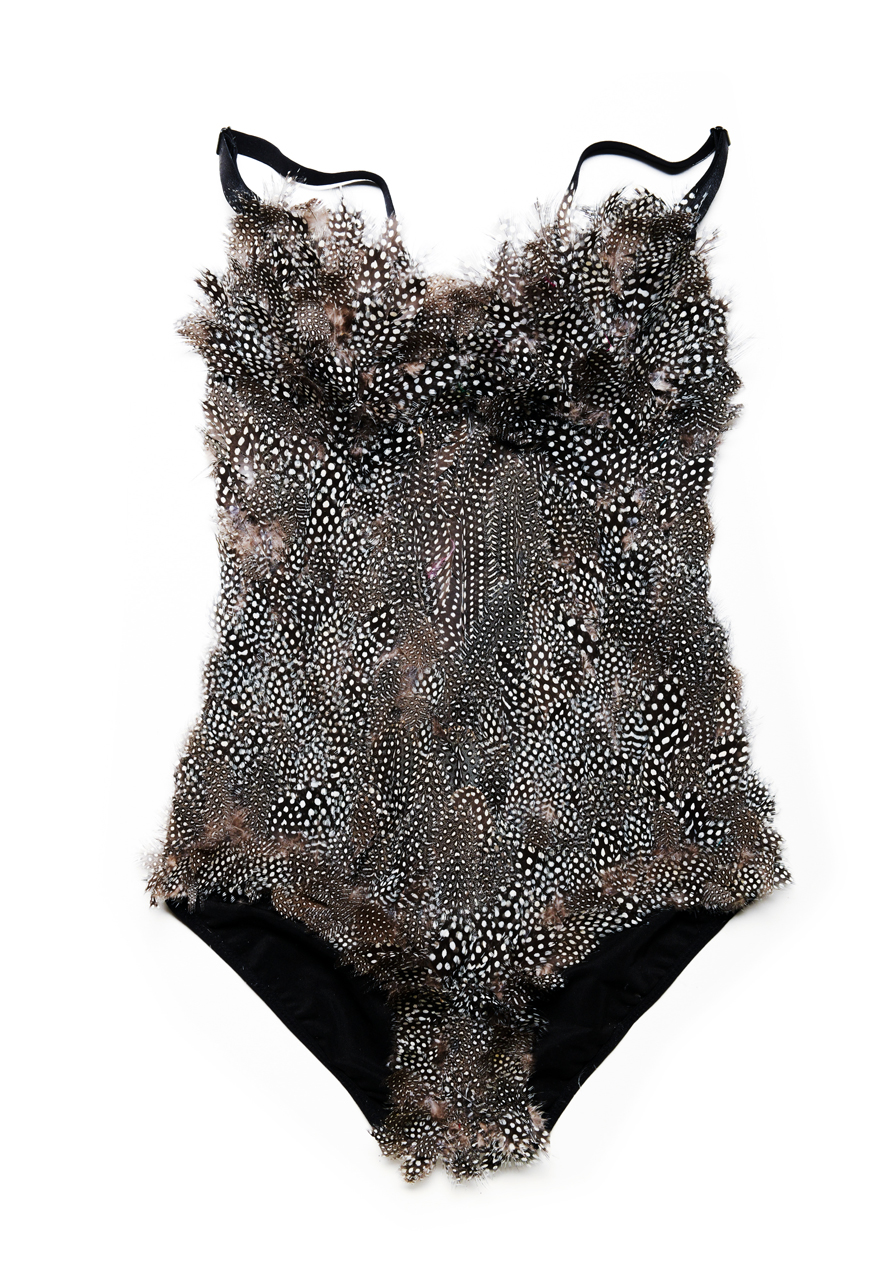
Underwear I (2019)

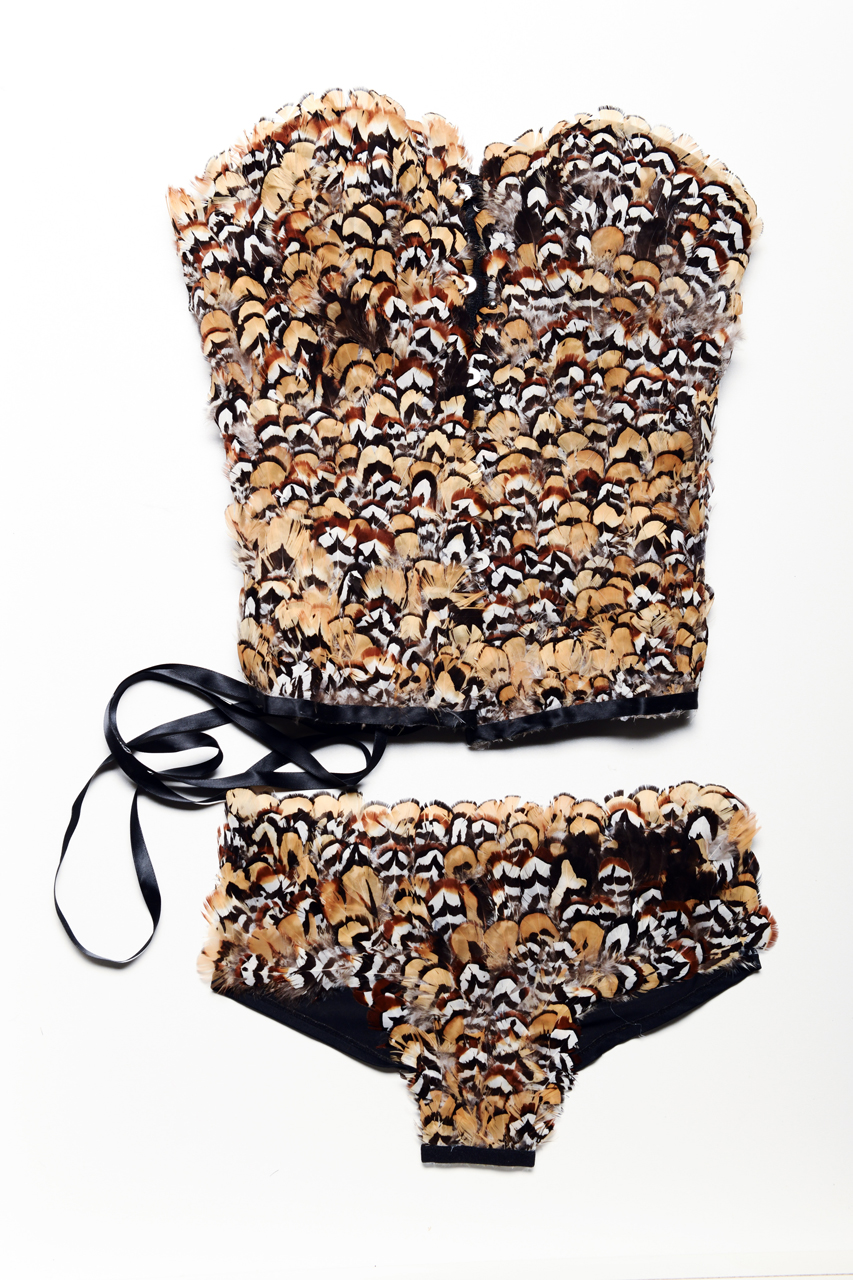
Underwear II (2019)

Skavová has always been close to performance art, dance theatre and film. Already at the Academy, she organized performances of AVUbelles, majorettes, and Nepraš's plymate calendar (graduation exhibition Lesbian School of Karel Nepraš, 2002). Since 2005, she has been an important actor in the performance group Kolouchův sen (Fawn´s Dream) (Michaela Huffstetter, Hana Poislová, and a hobbyist group of models), and has also created masks and costumes for events and performances. Fawn´s Dream has been performed by Women's Weapons group at the Alfred ve dvoře Theatre (2007, 2009), and The Little Sea Wolf on the Forman Brothers' Ship (2010). She began working with film in 2005 and has created a number of sculptures for it, applying her rich imagination. One such sculpture is Griffin (2014), a mythical animal creature with the body, tail and hind legs of a lion, and the head and wings of an eagle.

Her realizations of sculptures in public space are also unorthodox and innovative. The statue of the Dragon (2003), which is a symbol of the town of Trutnov and has its own place of remembrance, is based on a folk tale and depicts a creature lying on its back, already killed. For the Trutnov festivities, the sculptor designed the Dragon Gate (2009) with a large-scale statue of a dragon carved from a polystyrene block, patinated as bronze. For the Autostyl company in Trutnov, she created three geometrically stylized dragon sculptures, bearing on their bodies a relief of assembly keys as a symbol of the car service. The statue of Rübezahl (Rýbrcoul) on the Trutnov roundabout refers to the first depiction of the pagan mountain god on Helwig's map of Silesia from 1561, and has nothing to do with Rübezahl from modern children's fairy tales.

=== Conceptual projects ===
- 2008 Prague, Kampa Artphone
- 2008 Prague, O2 Arena, Helpline Box

=== Set design, costumes, props ===
- 2005 figure of a player, Bistrofilms, directed by M. Nohejl, Prague
- 2008 sculpture for the film Protector, directed by M. Najbrt, Prague
- 2010 art collaboration, film Leaving, directed by Václav Havel, Prague
- 2010 masks for the performance The Trials, Spitfire company, directed by P.Boháč, High Court, Prague
- 2011 set for the performance Bad clowns, Spitfire company, Prague
- 2011 set and costumes, Traffic dance, Prague[20]
- 2013 masks for the performance Antiwords (based on the play Audience by Václav Havel), Spitfire company
- 2014 realization of Griffin statue, Crossing Lines 2, Prague
- 2015 realization of statues and relief of Lycans for the film Underworld, Prague
- 2016 Realization of sculptures for the film Underworld, architect Ondřej Nekvasil
- 2017 objects for the performance Fragments of Love Relations, Spitfire company theatre, Prague
- 2017 Sculptures of the Fireflies for the HBO film Krypton, architect Ondřej Nekvasil, Belfast, UK
- 2017 Sculptures of fairies for the film Carnival Row, Prague
- 2017 Set design for Heroin West/ Halka Třešňáková & VerteDance, Žďár nad Sázavou
- 2017 masks for the performance Doba z druhé ruky / Second-hand Time, adaptation of Svetlana Alexievich's book, Spitfire company, Jatka 78, Prague
- 2018 Christ statue for the film Knightfall, HBO, Prague
- 2019 Statues of priestesses for The Wheel of Time, Amazon Studios, architect Ondřej Nekvasil, Prague
- 2020 Guardian statues for The Wheel of Time, Amazon Studios, architect Ondřej Nekvasil, Prague
- 2020 The Presidents, masks, director Petr Boháč, Prague
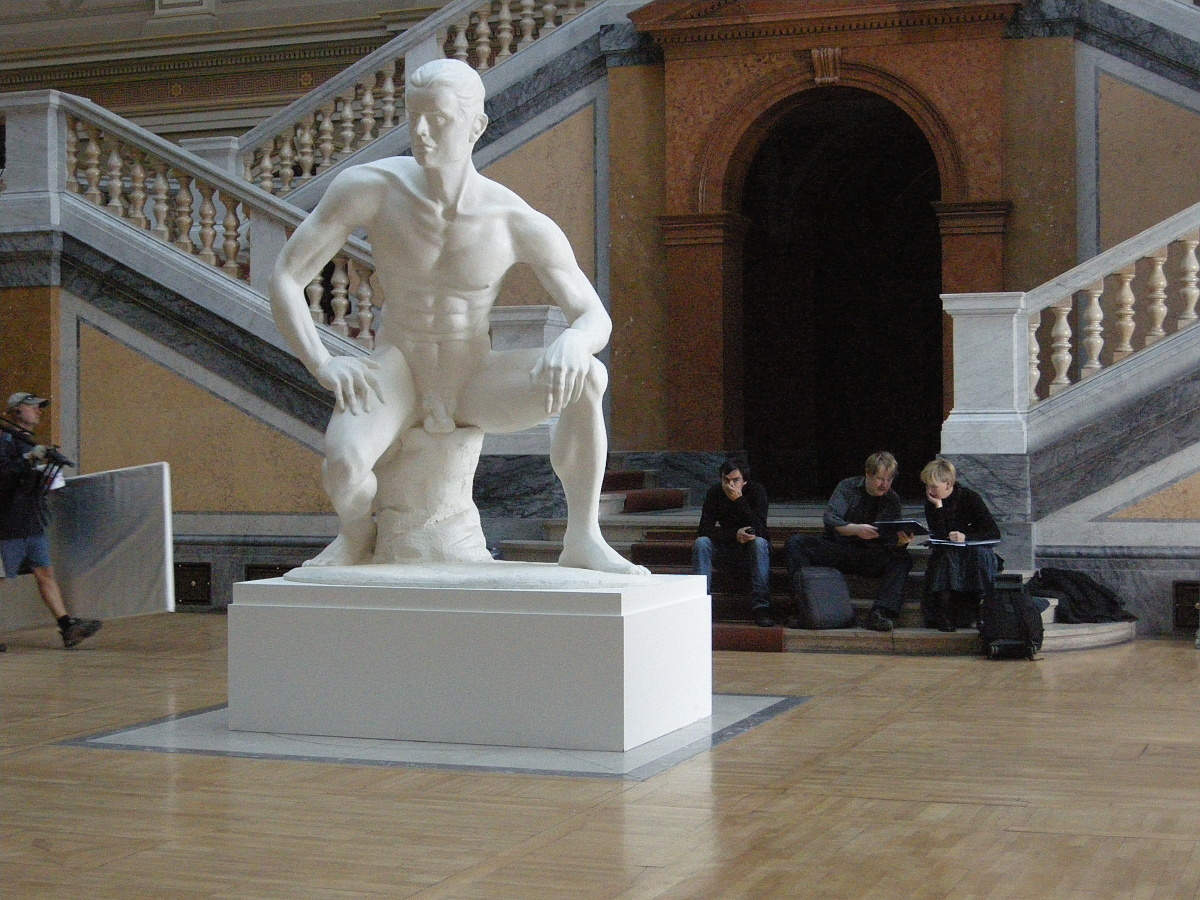
Sculpture for the film Protector, 2008

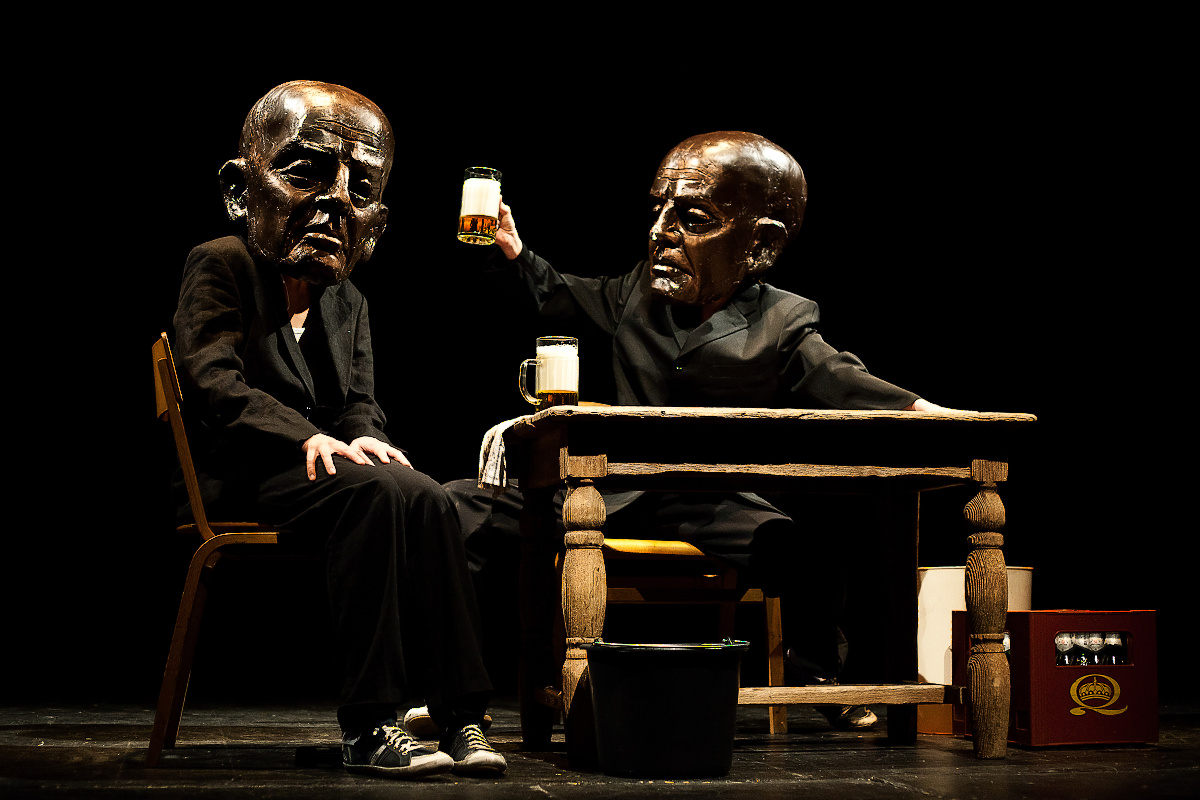
masks for Antiwords performance, Spitfire Company, 2013

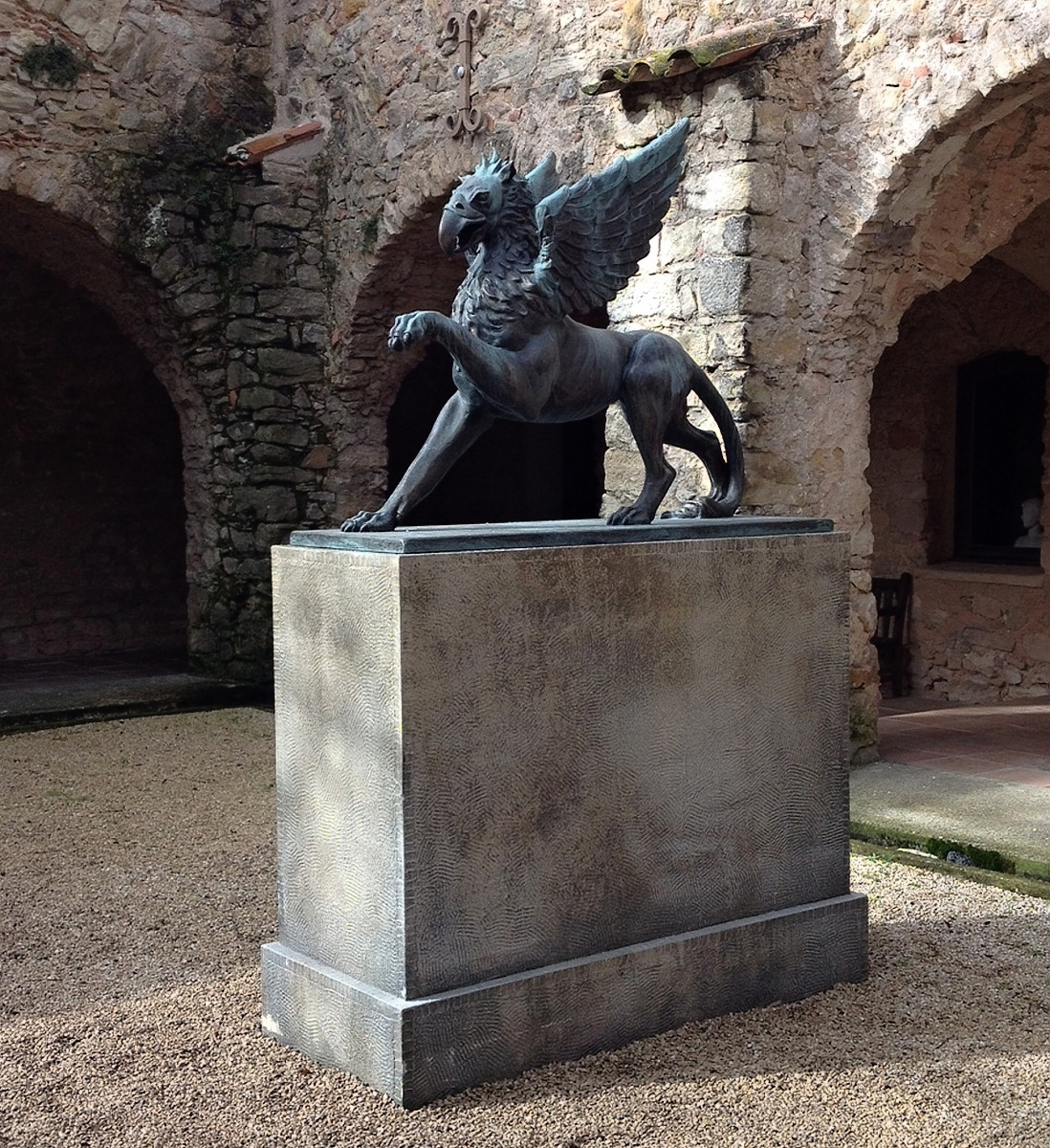
Griffin, epoxy, realization for film, 2014

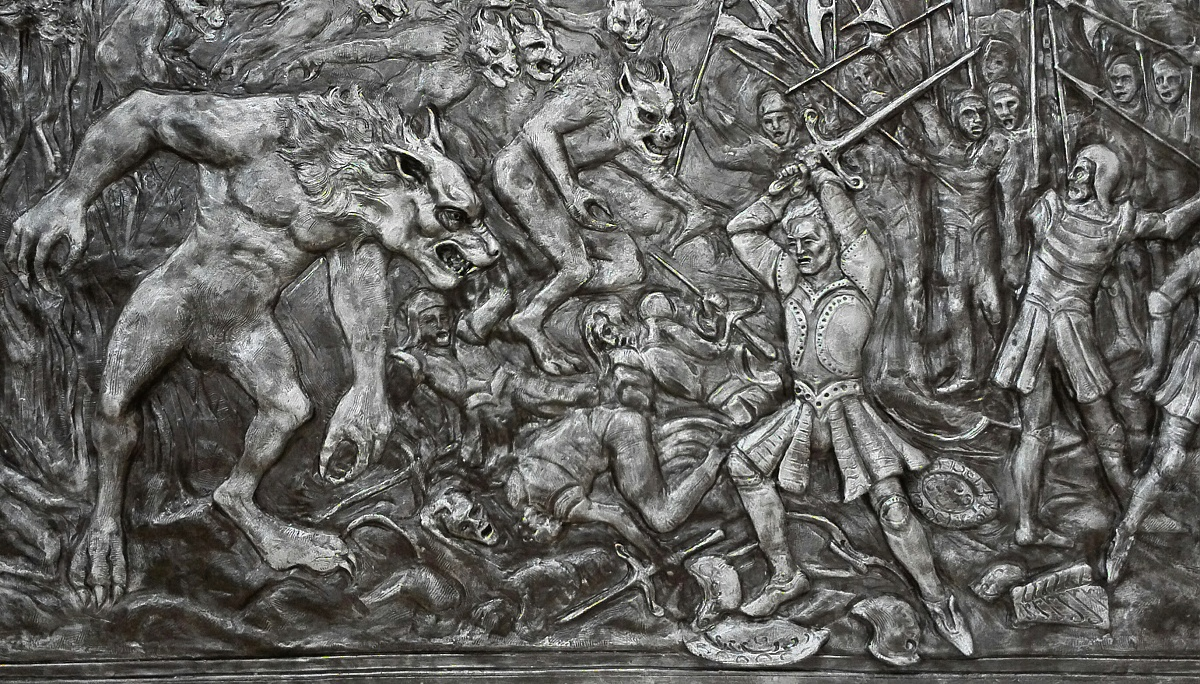
Relief for the film Underworld, 2017

=== Realisations ===
- 2008 assistance in the realization of the statue of the Warrior by Jiří Sozanský
- 2010 collaboration with Jiří Sozanský on the model of the statue of Milada Horáková, Prague
- 2010 three bronze statues of dragons in front of Autostyle Trutnov
- 2010 Bust of Antonín Rückl and statue of Vilímek Ostrovský, Ostrov
- 2011 Bust of Dr. Šťastný for the Písek Hospital
- 2013 Commemorative plaque of actor Radovan Lukavský, 24 Kouřimská Street, Prague 3 Vinohrady
- 2013 Bronze statue of Rübezahl at the roundabout, Trutnov
- 2013 bronze statue of Frank Sidebottom, Manchester
- 2014 bronze statue of Christ, Bohdaneč
- 2015 four bronze statues of Permoniks at the Rübezahl Fountain, Trutnov
- 2015 bronze statue of horse Achal Teke, Moscow
- 2015 Firefly - lamp, area of the Písek Hospital
- 2015 Hand statue for Kasper Kovo, Trutnov
- 2015 Aquabella statue for Grund a.s., Mladé Buky
- 2016 UNDERWEAR collection, for the Czech Center New York
- 2016 Fountain, revitalization of the square in Smiřice, in cooperation with architect Hana Josefinová
- 2016 Eagle statue, monument to field hunters 1866 Václavice, Náchod
- 2016 Memorial plaque to General Mašín, Roudnice nad Labem
- 2016 Memorial plaque to Bishop Stanislav Krátký, Brno
- 2017 Restoration of the memorial in Zboriv, architect Lukáš Hudák
- 2017 Realization of the sculpture Dance of Death by Emil Schwantner, Trutnov
- 2018 Realization of the memorial to General Josef Churavý in the Military Geographical and Hydrometeorological Office (VGHMÚř) in Dobruška
- 2018 Realization of the memorial to the fallen legionaries of the 4th Rifle Regiment of Prokop the Great in Hradec Králové, architect Lukáš Hudák
- 2018 Realization of the memorial plaque ZLATÁ PECKA, Chrudim
- 2018 Realization of the labyrinth of John Amos Comenius in Žacléř
- 2018 Realization of the bust of Tomáš Masaryk in Benátky nad Jizerou
- 2018 Realization of the bust of Tomáš Masaryk, Biskupice
- 2018 Realization of the bust of Tomáš Masaryk, Náchod
- 2019 Realization of the memorial plaque of conductor Karel Ančerl, Prague
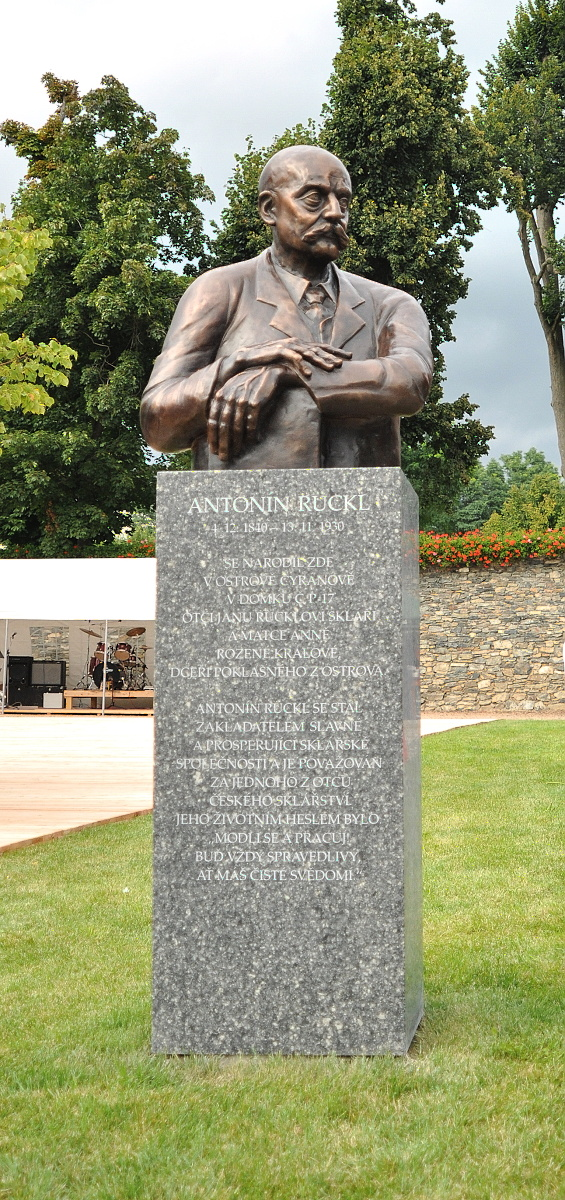
Bust of Antonín Rückl (2010)

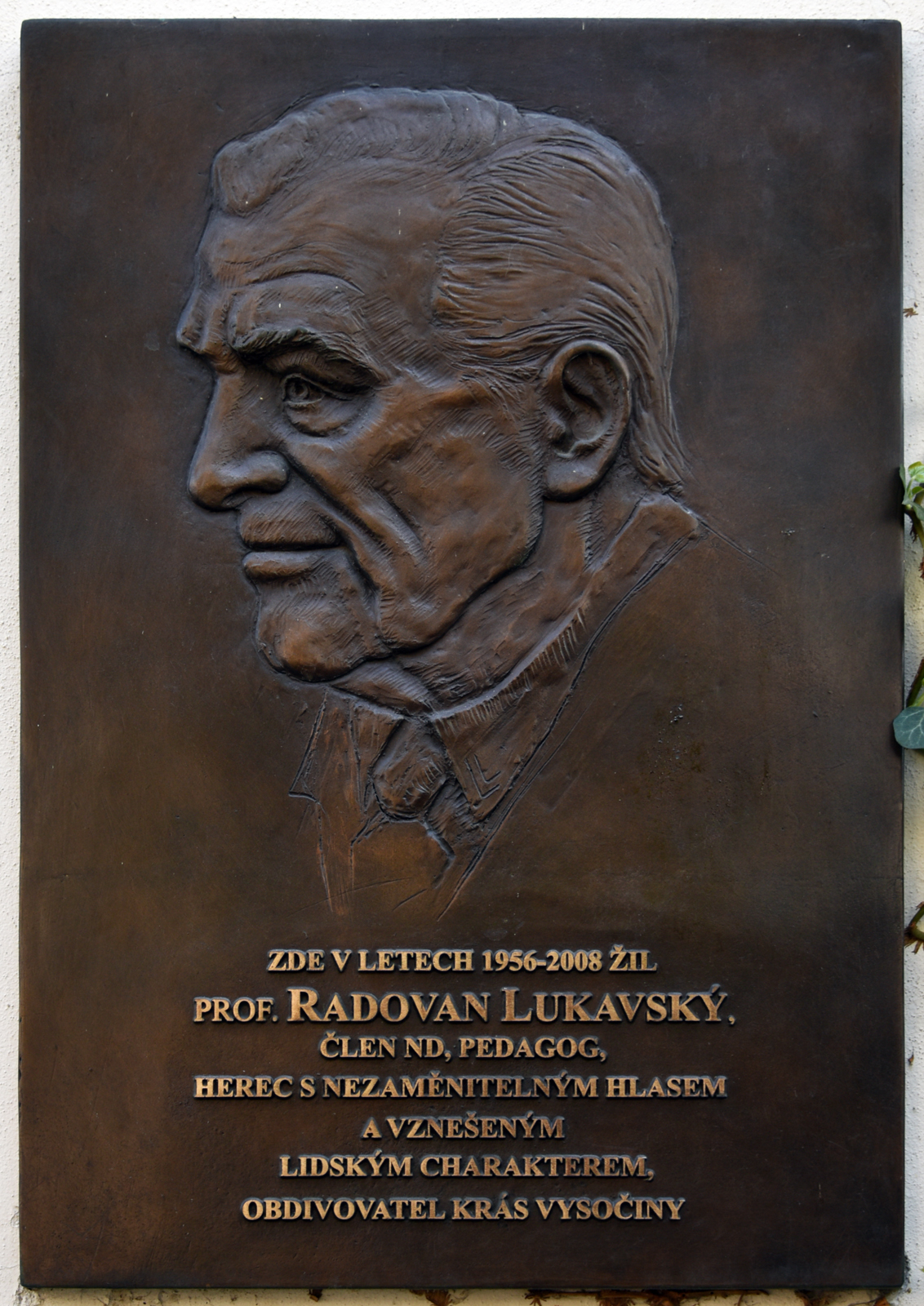
Memorial plaque of Radovan Lukavský, Vinohrady (2013)

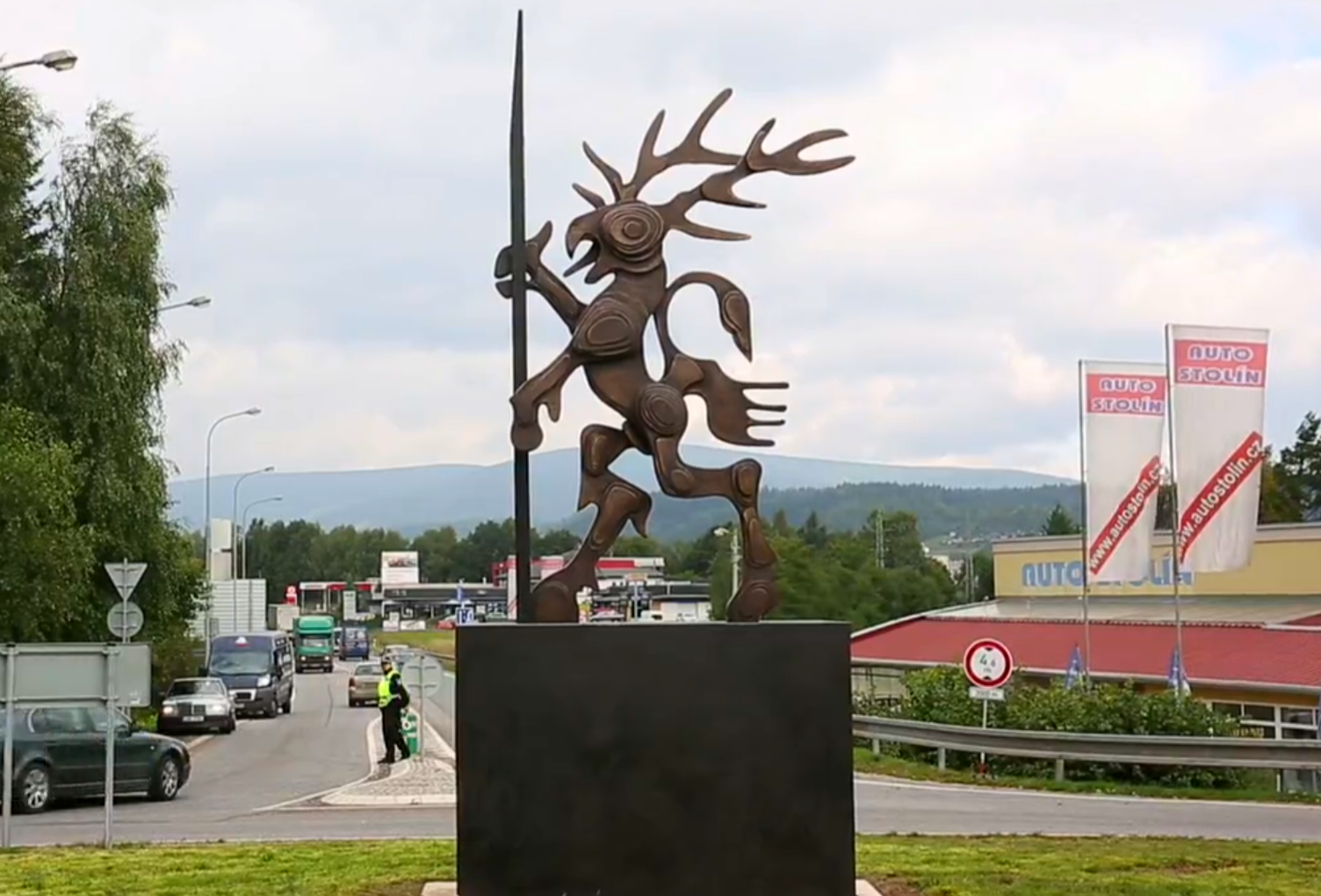
Rýbrcoul (2013), Trutnov

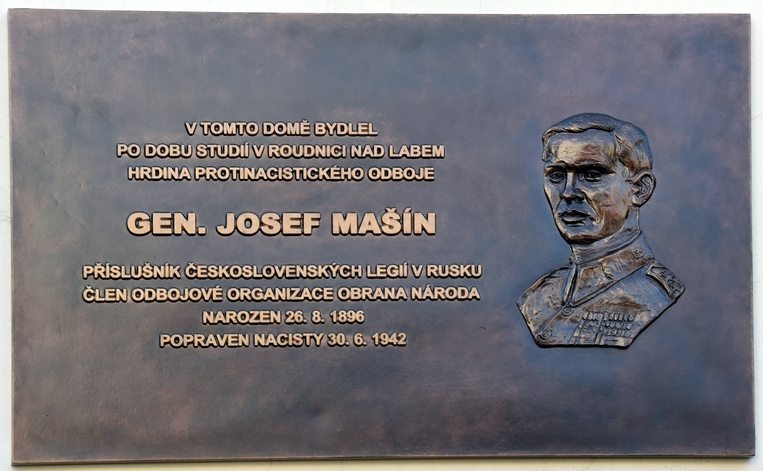
Memorial plaque of General Josef Mašín (2016), Roudnice nad Labem

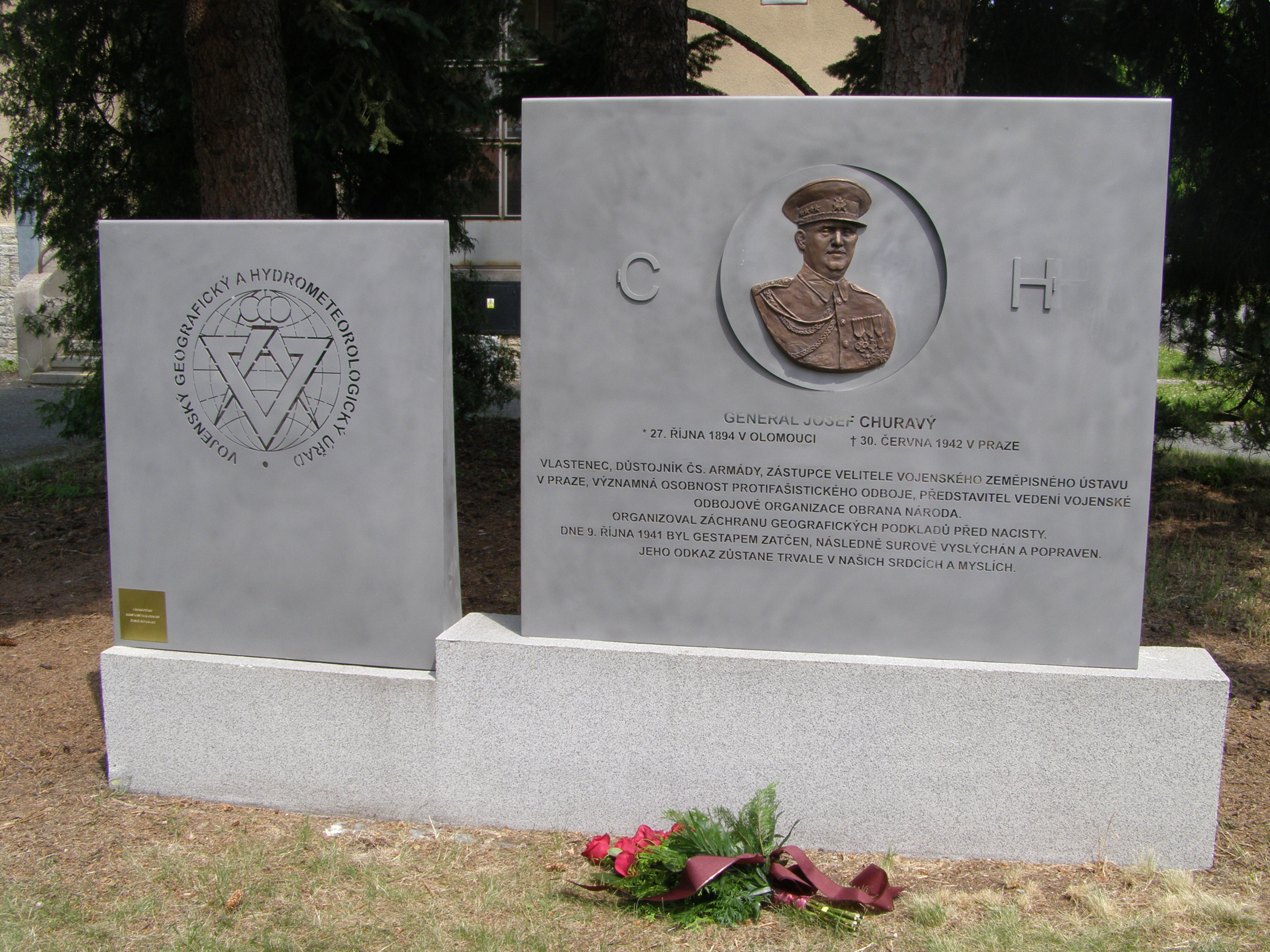
Memorial of General Josef Churavý in Dobruška (2018)

=== Representation in collections ===
- National Gallery in Prague
- Municipal Gallery, Trutnov
- Czech Center New York, USA
- Montanelli Museum, Prague
- Private collections in the Czech Republic, Poland, Germany, Russia, Switzerland and the USA

=== Sculpture symposia ===
- 1999 Bronze Helsinki
- 2001 Bata Foundation Zlín
- 2002 Art Centre Český Krumlov
- 2004 Performance Intensiv Woche, Luzern
- 2005 Trutnov
- 2016 International Symposium 8SEM, Bratislava

=== Exhibitions ===
==== Solo ====
- 2011 Paulina Skavova - P.S., St. Anthony of Padua Monastery Church, Sokolov
- 2012 Paulina Skavova: Biondo, Michal's Collection Gallery, Prague
- 2015 Paulina Skavova: Skulpturen, KUNSTpassageHOF, Hof, Germany
- 2016 Paulina Skavova: Underwear, Czech Center New York, USA
- 2017 Paulina Skavova: In the Woods, Zet Gallery, Velká Bystřice
- 2018 Paulina Skavova: Moon Goddess, Exhibition Hall Chrudim
- 2019 Paulina Skavova: Par Force, OKO, Opava
- 2020 Paulina Skavova: Par Force, UFFO Gallery, Trutnov
- 2020 Paulina Skavova: Par Force, Aleš Gallery of the South Bohemian Region, Bechyně

==== Collective (selection) ====
- 2003 281 m^{2}, Václav Špála Gallery, Prague
- 2003 Graduates of AVU 2003, Veletržní palác, Prague
- 2005 Young Art 1998–2005. Official Art 1960–1989, Mánes, Prague
- 2006 BLACK '06 - 2nd year of Pardubice Art Festival, Pardubice
- 2006 Přibližovadla, ArtPro - Gallery of Czech Sculpture / Artpro Gallery, Prague
- 2007 The Art of Giving Birth, National Gallery Prague
- 2007 Náchod Art Autumn. 24th Art Show of the Region, Gallery of Fine Arts in Náchod
- 2008 Estrogen (P. Skavová, M. Korečková, M. Jůdová), Mázhaus Gallery, Pardubice
- 2008/2009 Winners, La Fabrika, Prague
- 2011 Love is blind, sex is elsewhere, Artinbox Gallery, Prague
- 2011/2012 Fairies, Elves and Dwarves, Artinbox Gallery, Prague
- 2012 Ekecheiriá: Memories of Olympia. A Tribute to the Olympic Tradition, Prague City Museum
- 2012 Art Safari 24, Bubec Sculpture Studio, Prague
- 2012 Original Perspectives: a selection of contemporary Czech and Slovak work by artists of the young and middle generation, U Bílého jednorožce Gallery, Klatovy
- 2012 From Nowhere to Nowhere, for Nothing, Close to the Border, Monastery Church of St. Anthony of Padua - Concert and Exhibition Hall, Sokolov
- 2013 Art Safari 26, Bubec Sculpture Studio, Prague
- 2015 Typology of the Triad, Gallery U Bílého jednorožce, Klatovy
- 2016 About Sport, Gallery of the City of Pardubice, Pardubice
- 2016 Sculptures of Šmeral's Villa, Svatý Kopeček, Olomouc
- 2016 International Symposium 8SEM, Bratislava
- 2017 Art- Brut- All, Jaroměř, Michal Mine, Ostrava
- 2018 Artprague, Clam- Gallas Palace, Prague
- 2018 REALITY SHOW, Arcimboldo Gallery, Prague
- 2019 BEAUTY AND LUST, Regional Gallery Liberec
- 2019 ART - BRUT - ALL, DOX Prague

== Sources ==
- Diplomanti AVU 2003, text by Kokolia Vladimír, Kříž Jan, cat. 48 p., AVU Prague 2003
- Academy of Fine Arts in Prague.
- Art Prague: 4. veletrh současného umění / 4th International Contemporary Art Fair, text Grund David, Nesvadbová Iva, cat. 79 p., Praha 2005
- The Art of Giving Birth, text by Kukla Eugen, Rovderová Nadia, cat. Hnutí za aktivní materřství, Prague 2007
- BLACK 06, cat. 48 p., 2nd annual Pardubice Art Festival, Pardubice, cat. 48 p., Pardubice 2007
- Winners, text by Sozanský Jiří, cat. 34 p., Symposion Prague 2008
- Contemporary Czech Painting and Sculpture, curator Karolina Dolanská, National Gallery in Prague 2010, p. 82 on line
- Ekecheiriá: Memories of Olympia. Recollections of Olympia. A tribute to olympic traditions, text Kotalík Jiří Tomáš, Sozanská Olga, Sozanský Jiří, cat. 50 p., Symposion Praha 2012
- Petr Volf, Sport je umění: Sport is art, KANT Praha 2015, ISBN 978-80-7437-162-2
- Paulina Skavova: Moon Goddess, text by Martina Vítková, exhibition catalogue, Chrudimská beseda 2018
- Paulina Skavova: Par Force, text by Jan Kunze, OKO Opava 2019, ISBN 978-80-906675-4-9
