= Novosedly (Strakonice District) =

- Municipality
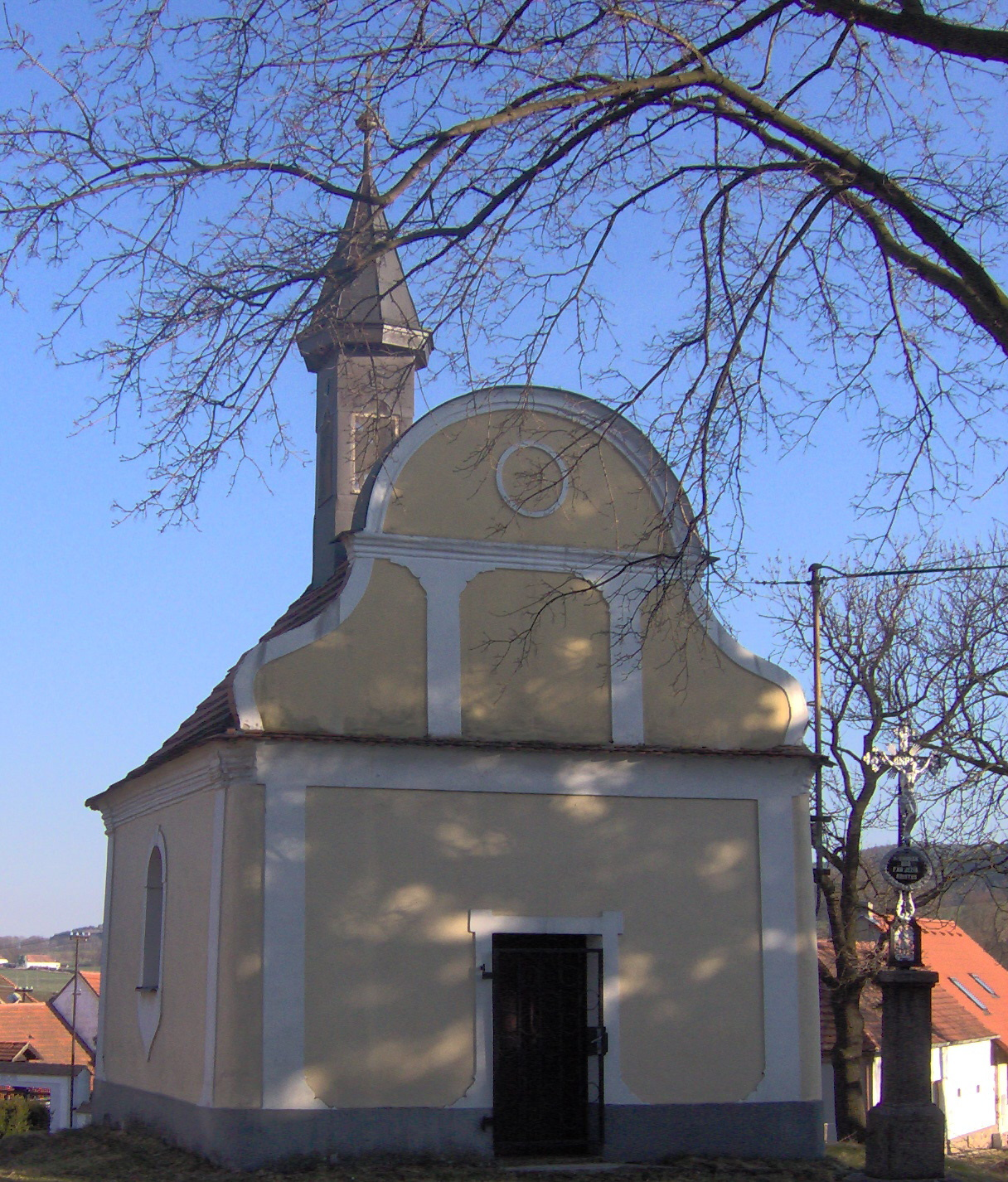
- Chapel in Novosedly

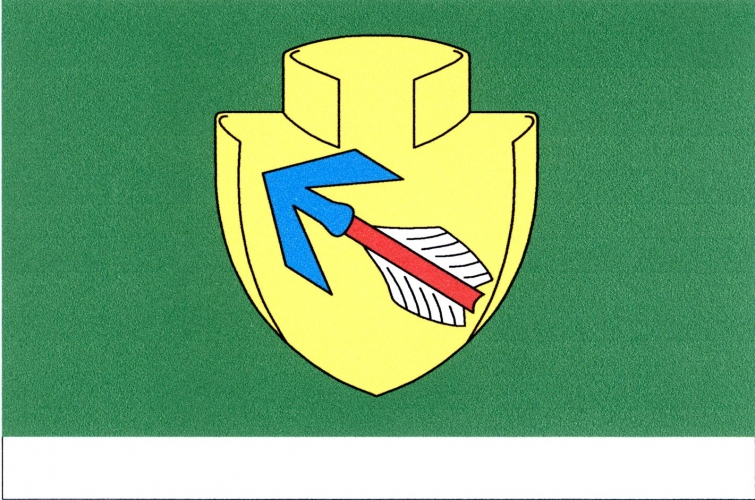
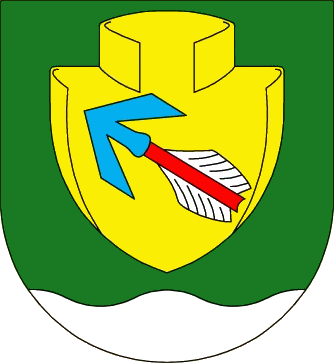
- Flag Coat of arms

- Location in the Czech Republic
- Coordinates: 49°15′46″N 13°47′51″E
- Country: Czech Republic
- Region: South Bohemian
- District: Strakonice
- First mentioned: 1227

Area
  - Total: 8.44 km^{2} (3.26 sq mi)
- Elevation: 418 m (1,371 ft)

Population (2026-01-01)
  - Total: 344
  - Density: 40.8/km^{2} (106/sq mi)
- Time zone: UTC+1 (CET)
  - Summer (DST): UTC+2 (CEST)
- Postal code: 387 16
- Website: www.novosedly.info

Novosedly is a municipality and village in Strakonice District in the South Bohemian Region of the Czech Republic. It has about 300 inhabitants.

Novosedly lies approximately 8 kilometres (5 mi) west of Strakonice, 58 km (36 mi) north-west of České Budějovice, and 103 km (64 mi) south-west of Prague.

== Etymology ==
The village was named after the people who were nově usedlí ('newly settled').

== Demographics ==
Historical population
Year	Pop.	±%
1869	628	—
1880	657	+4.6%
1890	644	−2.0%
1900	638	−0.9%
1910	663	+3.9%
1921	632	−4.7%
1930	576	−8.9%
1950	451	−21.7%
1961	442	−2.0%
1970	424	−4.1%
1980	395	−6.8%
1991	359	−9.1%
2001	338	−5.8%
2011	348	+3.0%
2021	330	−5.2%
Source: Censuses

== Notable people ==
- Paulina Skavova (born 1976), sculptor; lives and works here
