= Bohdaneč =

- Municipality
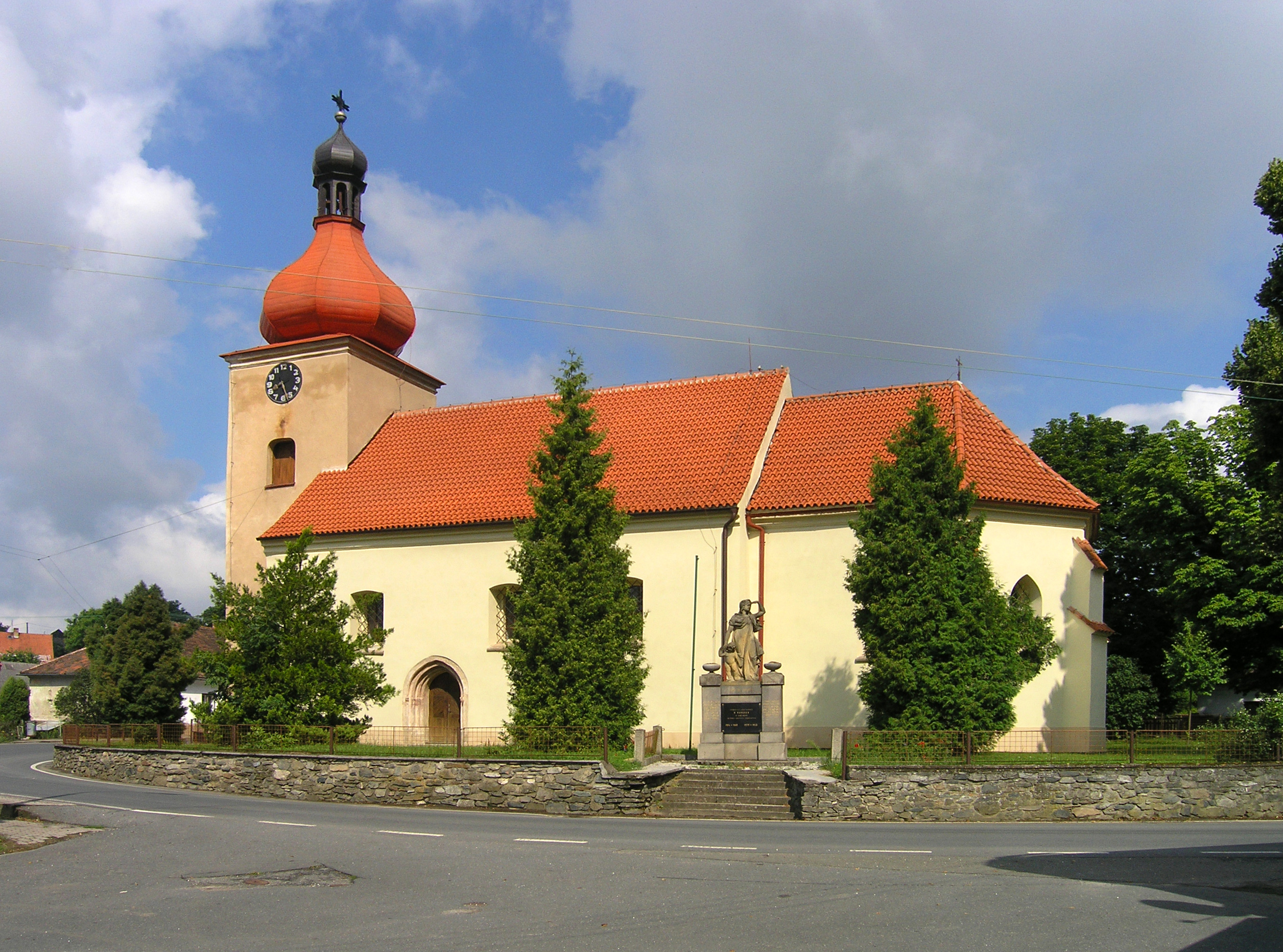
- Church of the Annunciation

- Flag Coat of arms

- Location in the Czech Republic
- Coordinates: 49°46′42″N 15°13′21″E
- Country: Czech Republic
- Region: Central Bohemian
- District: Kutná Hora
- First mentioned: 1233

Area
  - Total: 16.59 km^{2} (6.41 sq mi)
- Elevation: 463 m (1,519 ft)

Population (2026-01-01)
  - Total: 443
  - Density: 26.7/km^{2} (69.2/sq mi)
- Time zone: UTC+1 (CET)
  - Summer (DST): UTC+2 (CEST)
- Postal code: 285 25
- Website: www.obecbohdanec.cz

Bohdaneč is a municipality and village in Kutná Hora District in the Central Bohemian Region of the Czech Republic. It has about 400 inhabitants.

== Administrative division ==
Bohdaneč consists of six municipal parts (in brackets population according to the 2021 census):

- Bohdaneč (287)
- Dvorecko (2)
- Kotoučov (9)
- Prostřední Ves (73)
- Řeplice (32)
- Šlechtín (25)

== Etymology ==
The name Bohdaneč is derived from the personal name Bohdanec (a diminutive form of Bohdan), meaning "Bohdanec's". In the Middle Ages, the name Bohdanice was also used.

== Geography ==
Bohdaneč is located about 19 kilometres (12 mi) south of Kutná Hora and 58 km (36 mi) southeast of Prague. It lies in the Upper Sázava Hills. The highest point is at 546 m (1,791 ft) above sea level. The stream Ostrovský potok originates here, flows across the municipal territory and supplies two notable fishponds in the area: Pilský rybník and Karbanův rybník.

== History ==
The first written mention of Bohdaneč is from 1233. In 1514, Bohdaneč was promoted to a market town by King Vladislaus II, but lost the title after World War II. Dvorecko was first mentioned in 1487 under name Víceměřič. Kotoučov was first mentioned in 1525 and Prostřední Ves and Řeplice in 1381.

Šlechtín was a part of Prostřední Ves. In 1960, the municipalities of Dvorecko, Kotoučov, Prostřední Ves and Řeplice were merged with Bohdaneč.

== Demographics ==
Historical population

Year	Pop.	±%
1869	1,367	—
1880	1,314	−3.9%
1890	1,244	−5.3%
1900	1,234	−0.8%
1910	1,153	−6.6%

Year	Pop.	±%
1921	1,092	−5.3%
1930	1,028	−5.9%
1950	862	−16.1%
1961	721	−16.4%
1970	614	−14.8%

Year	Pop.	±%
1980	513	−16.4%
1991	446	−13.1%
2001	399	−10.5%
2011	430	+7.8%
2021	428	−0.5%

Source: Censuses

== Transport ==
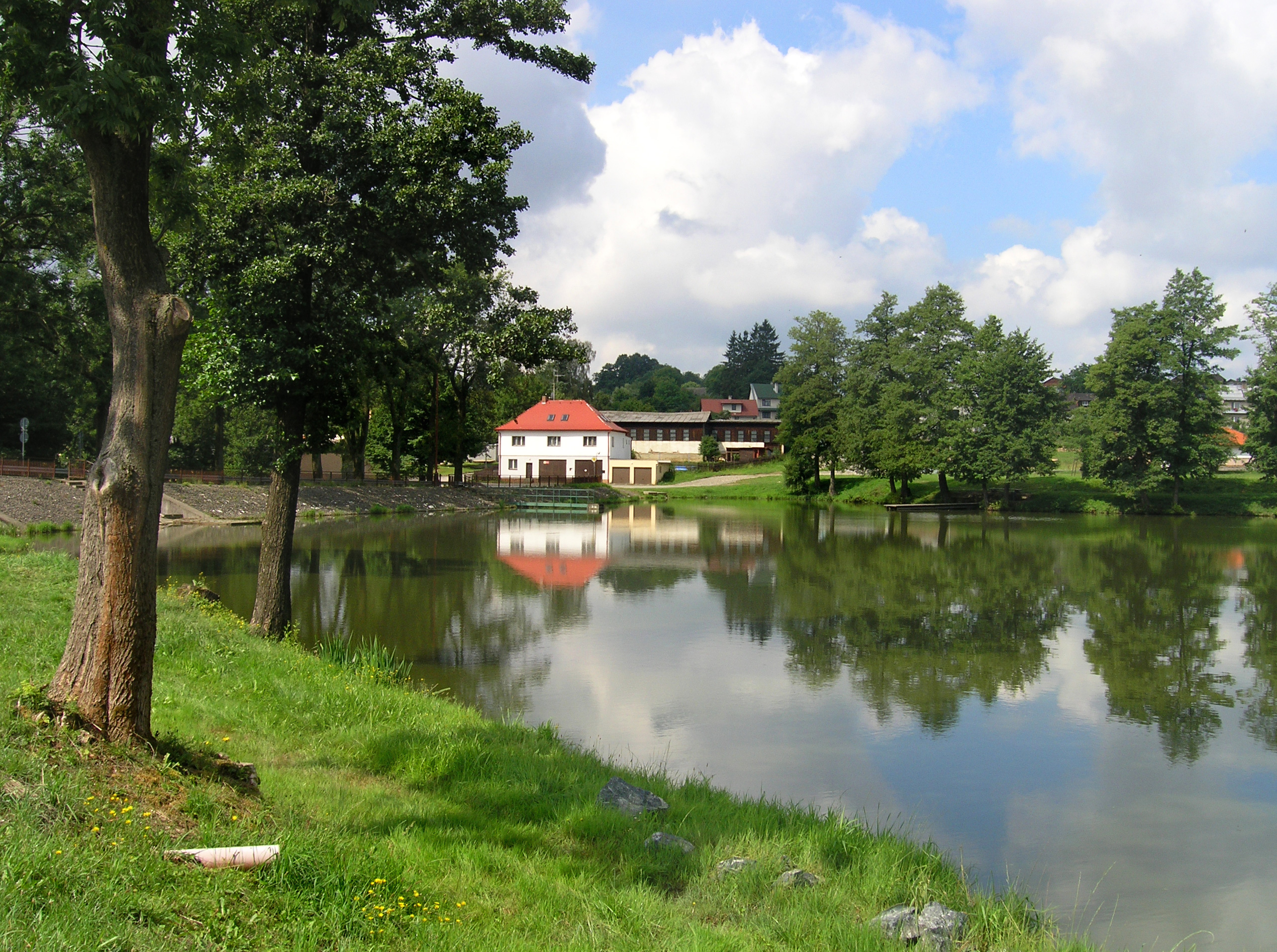
The fishpond Pilský rybník

There are no railways or major roads passing through the municipality.

== Sights ==
The most important monument is the Church of the Annunciation. It was originally built in the Gothic style in the mid-14th century. Baroque modifications were made in the 1760s and in 1868.
