= Sucharda =

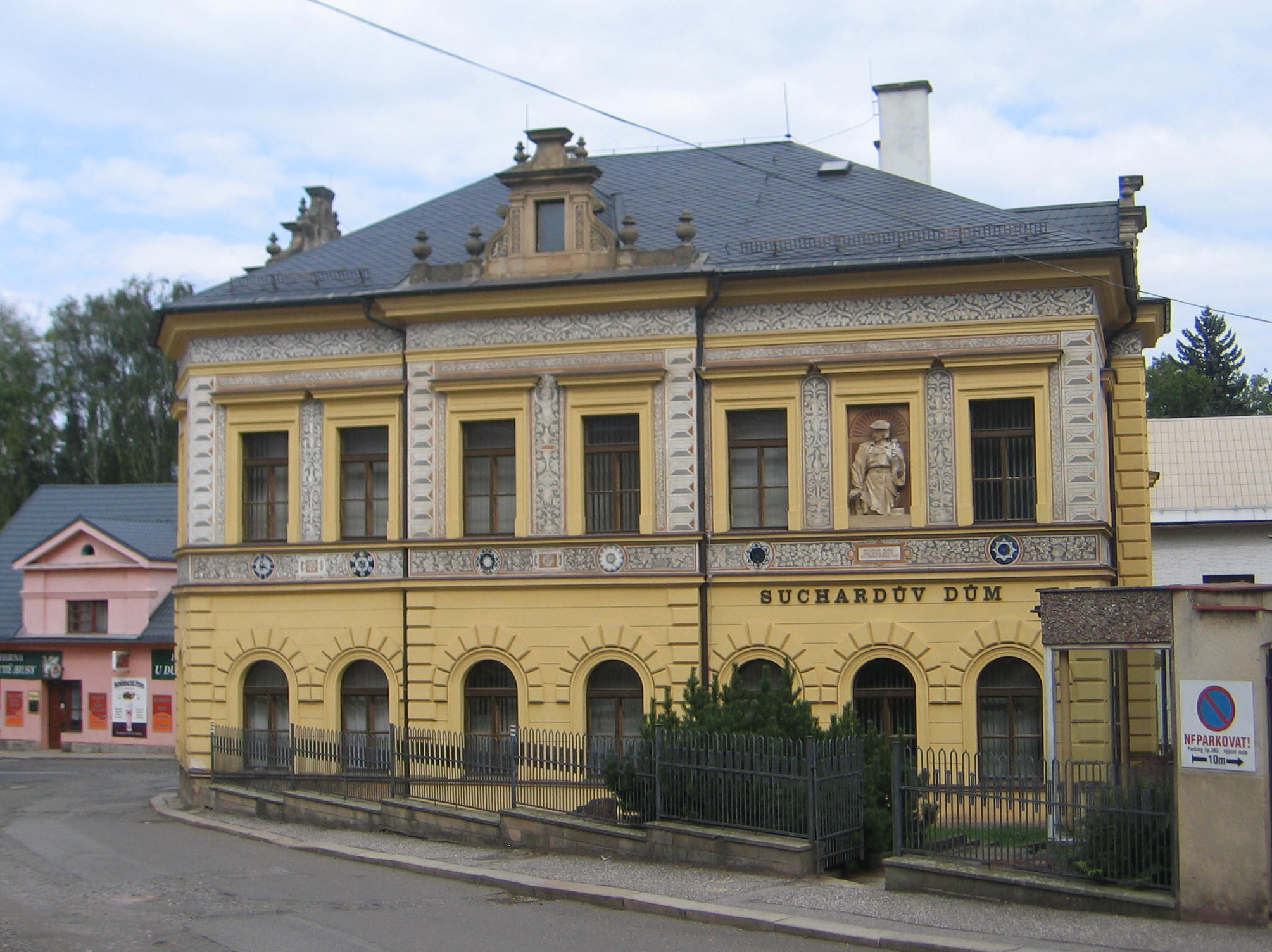
The residence of the Sucharda family from 1896 to 1908 (nowadays the City Museum of Nová Paka), the "Suchardův dům"

The Sucharda (Czech: Suchardové) were a noble family of artists, sculptors and woodcarvers from Nová Paka, Kingdom of Bohemia (present-day Czech Republic), who rose to prominence in the 19th and mid-20th centuries. Notable members of this family include:

- Jan Sucharda Sr. (1770–1820), woodcarver, sculptor and weaver, founder of the family.
- Jan Sucharda Jr. (1797–1873), woodcarver, sculptor and painter, son of the preceding.
- Antonín Sucharda Sr. (1812–1886), woodcarver, puppeteer, painter and draftsman, son of the preceding.
- Antonín Sucharda Jr. (1843–1911), woodcarver, sculptor, Spiritist speaker, Sokol member and architect, son of the preceding. He projected and helped to build the family's residence, the "Sucharda's house" ("Suchardův dům"), in 1896, which later became the City Museum of Nová Paka in 1908. He had three children:
  - Stanislav Sucharda (1866–1916), sculptor, designer and medallist.
  - Vojtěch "Vojta" Sucharda (1884–1968), woodcarver, puppeteer, restorer and sculptor.
  - Anna Boudová Suchardová (1870–1940), still-life painter, ceramicist, textile artist and book illustrator. Mother of painter and professor at the Charles University Cyril Bouda (1901–1984), and grandmother of illustrator and graphic designer Jiří Bouda (1934–2015).

Other people with this surname, unrelated to the Sucharda family, include:

- Antonín Sucharda (1854–1907), Czech mathematician and rector of the Brno University of Technology (1903–1904).
- Bohumil Sucharda (1914–2009), Czech communist politician and Finance Minister of Czechoslovakia (1967–1969).
- Edward Sucharda (1891–1947), Polish chemist and engineer.
- Věroslav Sucharda (1976–), Czech retired basketball player.

== In popular culture ==
Czech black metal band Master's Hammer alludes to the Sucharda family and the Suchardův dům on the song "Suchardův dům (V Nové Pace)", off their 1992 album Jilemnický okultista.
