= Bohumil Kafka =

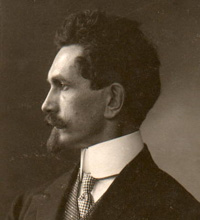
- Bohumil Kafka
- Born: 14 February 1878; Nová Paka, Bohemia, Austria-Hungary
- Died: 24 November 1942 (aged 64); Prague, Bohemia and Moravia
- Education: Academy of Arts, Architecture and Design in Prague
- Occupations: sculptor and pedagogue

Bohumil Kafka (14 February 1878 – 24 November 1942) was a Czech sculptor and pedagogue.

== Life ==
Bohumil Kafka was born on 14 February 1878 in Nová Paka. He studied in Prague with sculptor Josef Václav Myslbek before moving to Vienna and then Paris to continue his studies. He worked in London, Berlin and Rome before returning and settling in Prague. He frequently worked in an Expressive symbolist style, was a noted animalier as well as being known for his decorative sculpture. He was considered a predecessor to the Art Nouveau style and was highly influenced by the works of Auguste Rodin. He died on 24 November 1942 in Prague.

== Work ==
- Decoration of the National House in Prostějov and the Vojáček family monument in front of it, 1905-1907
- Orpheus, bronze, 1922 (exhibited at Kozel Castle)
- The Kiss, bronze, 1919
- Statue of Karel Havlíček Borovský, bronze, 1918-1924, Havlíčkův Brod
- Awakening, marble, 1925-26
- Statue of Josef Mánes in front of the Mánes Bridge, bronze
- Statue of Jan Žižka at the National Monument at Vítkov
- Statue of General M. R. Štefánik in Bratislava (original destroyed in 1940, rebuilt after 1990; one-third scale copy stands in front of Štefánik's Observatory)
- Somnambula, bronze (National Gallery in Prague)
- Bust of Tomáš Masaryk, bronze, 1925, (National Museum)
- Bust of JUDr. Karel Kramář, bronze, plaster model (National Museum)
- Bust of František Xaver Jerie, bronze (Jilemnice Town Hall)

== Gallery ==
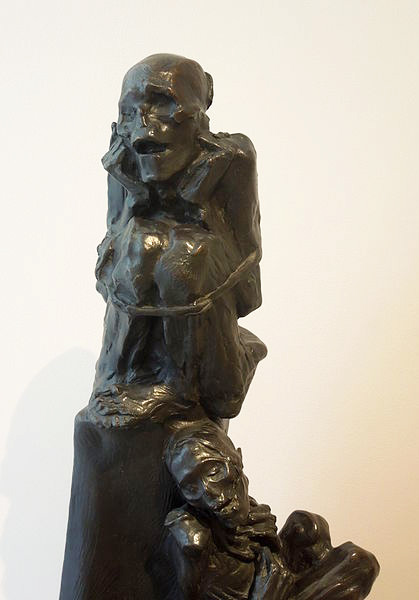
Mummy

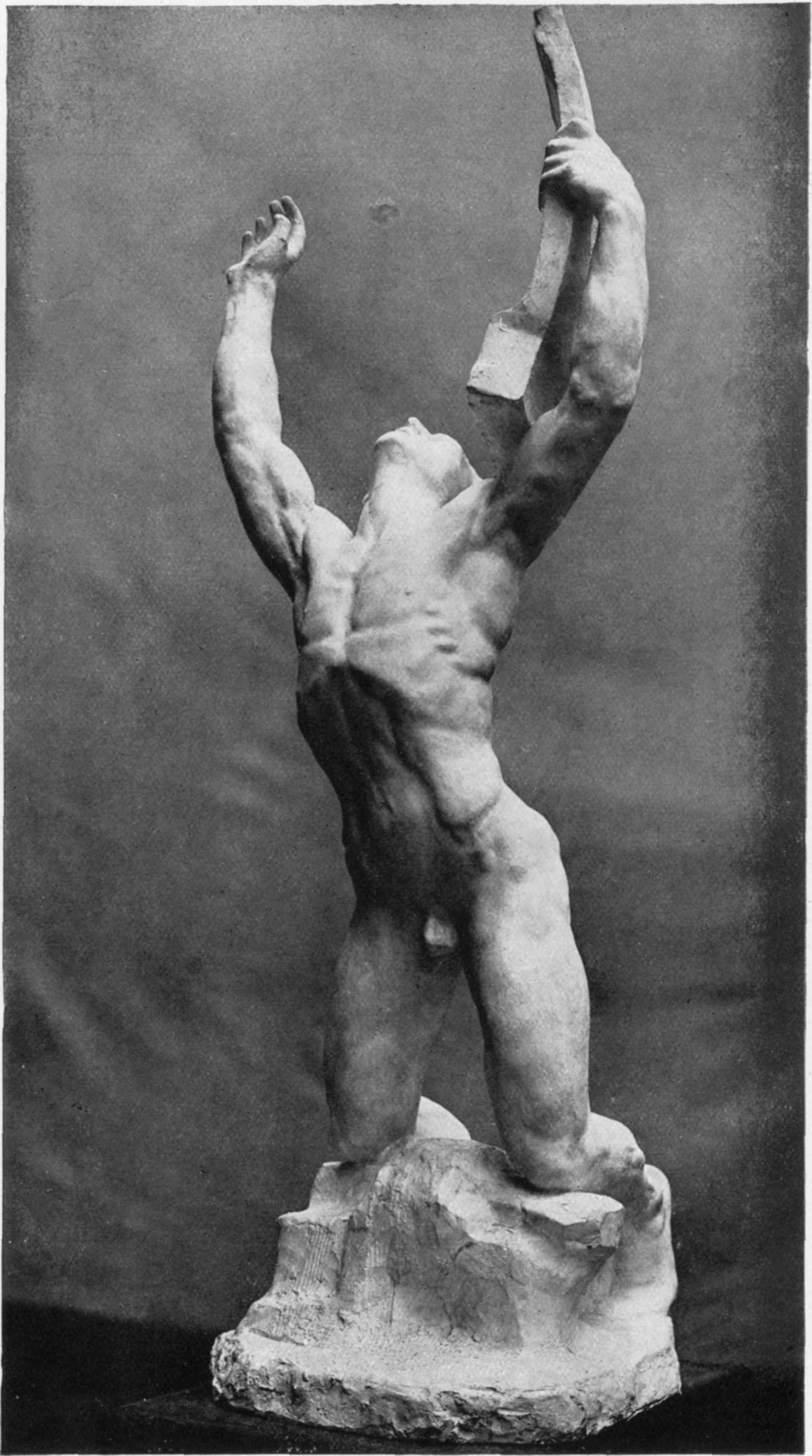
Orpheus

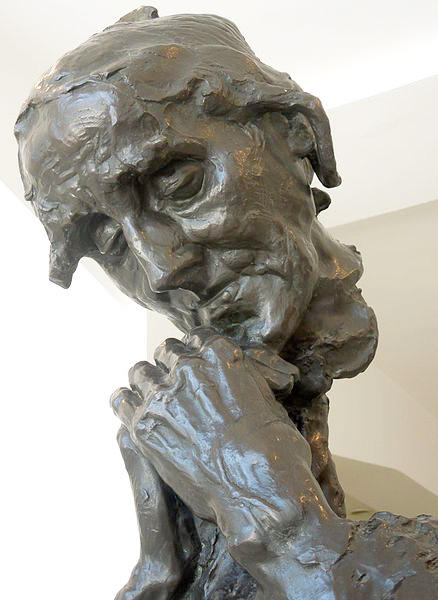
Ruin of Life

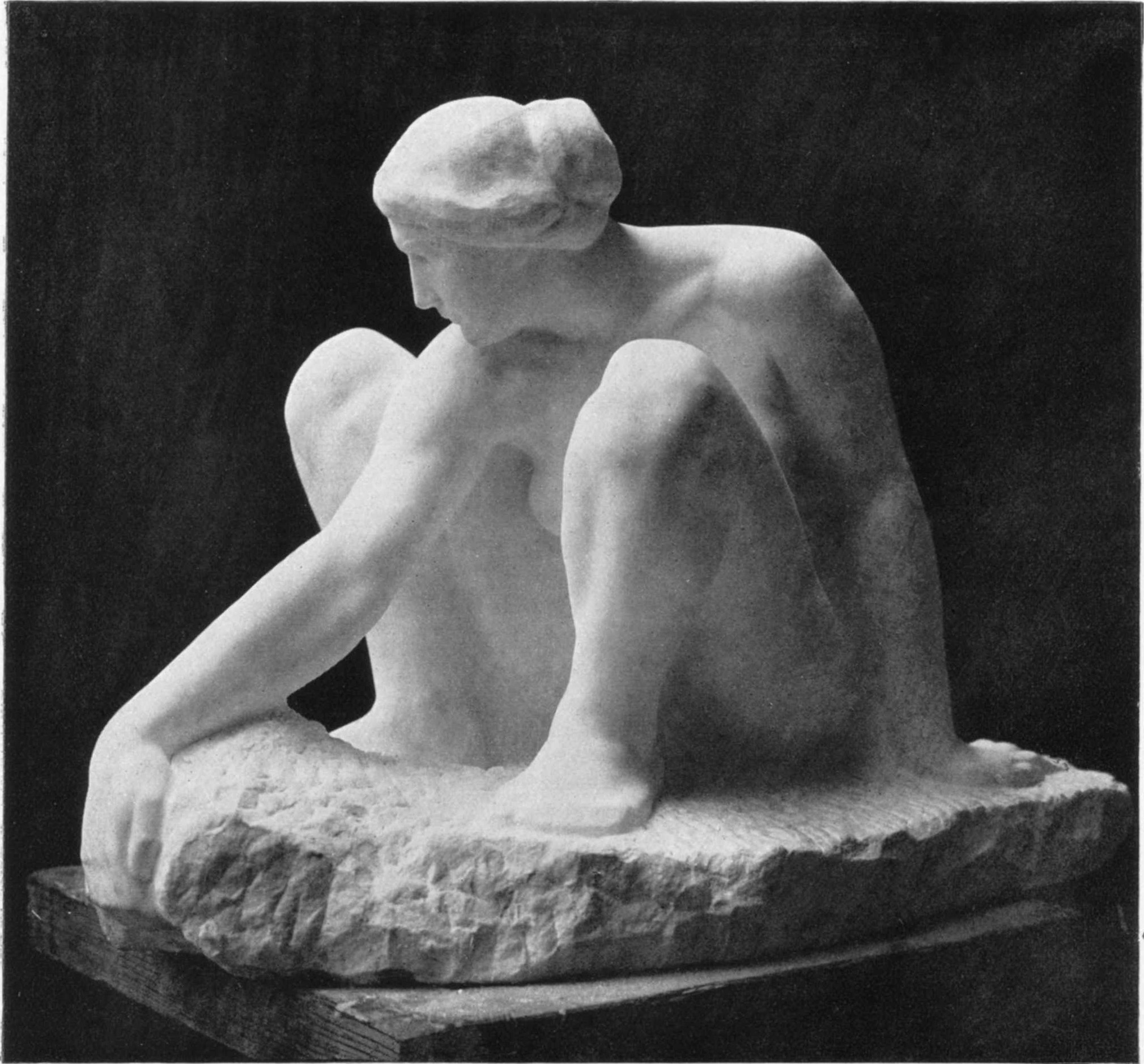
Crouching Woman

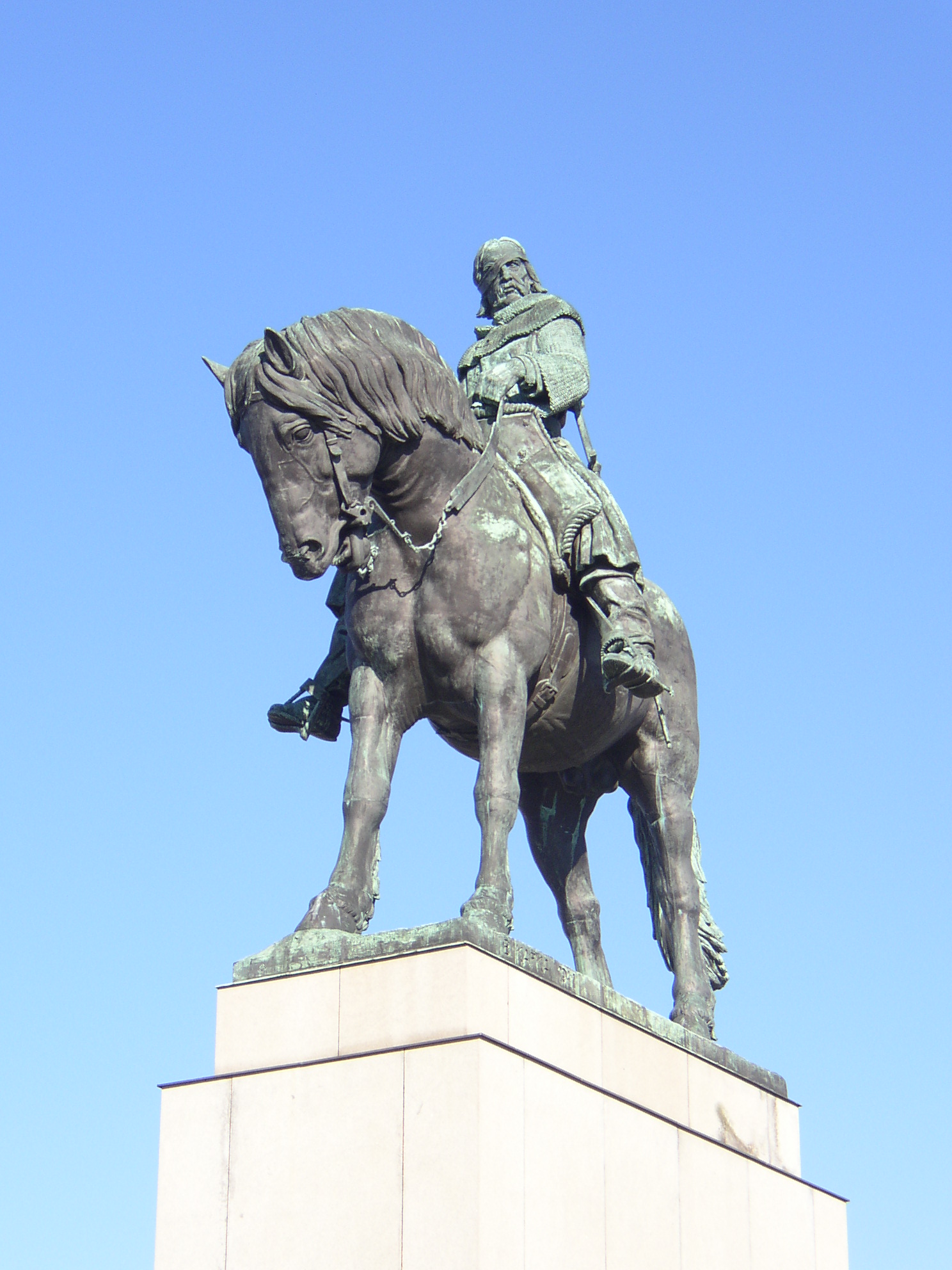
Equestrian statue of Jan Žižka on Vítkov Hill in Prague

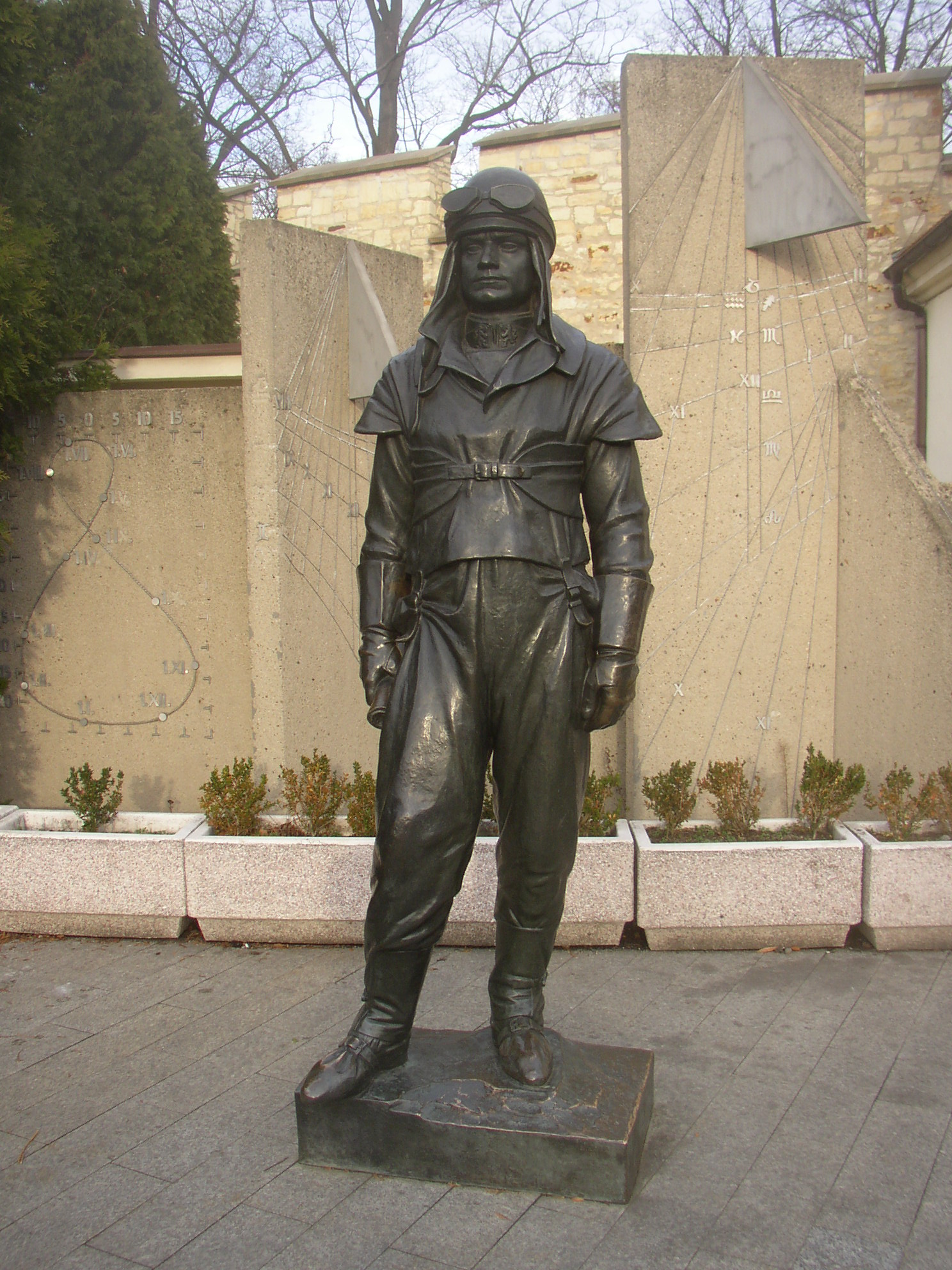
Statue of Milan Rastislav Štefánik at the Prague Observatory

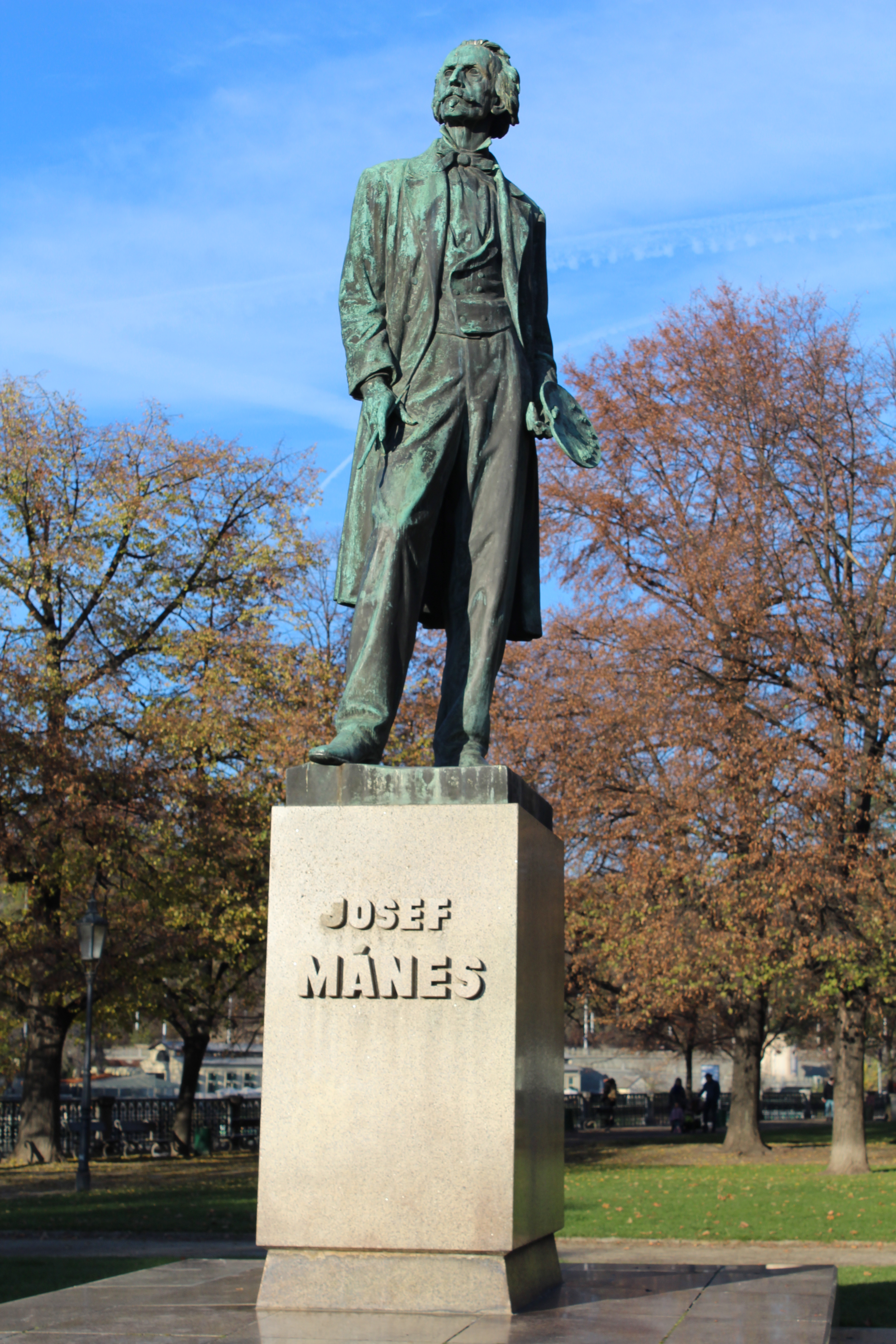
Statue of Josef Mánes

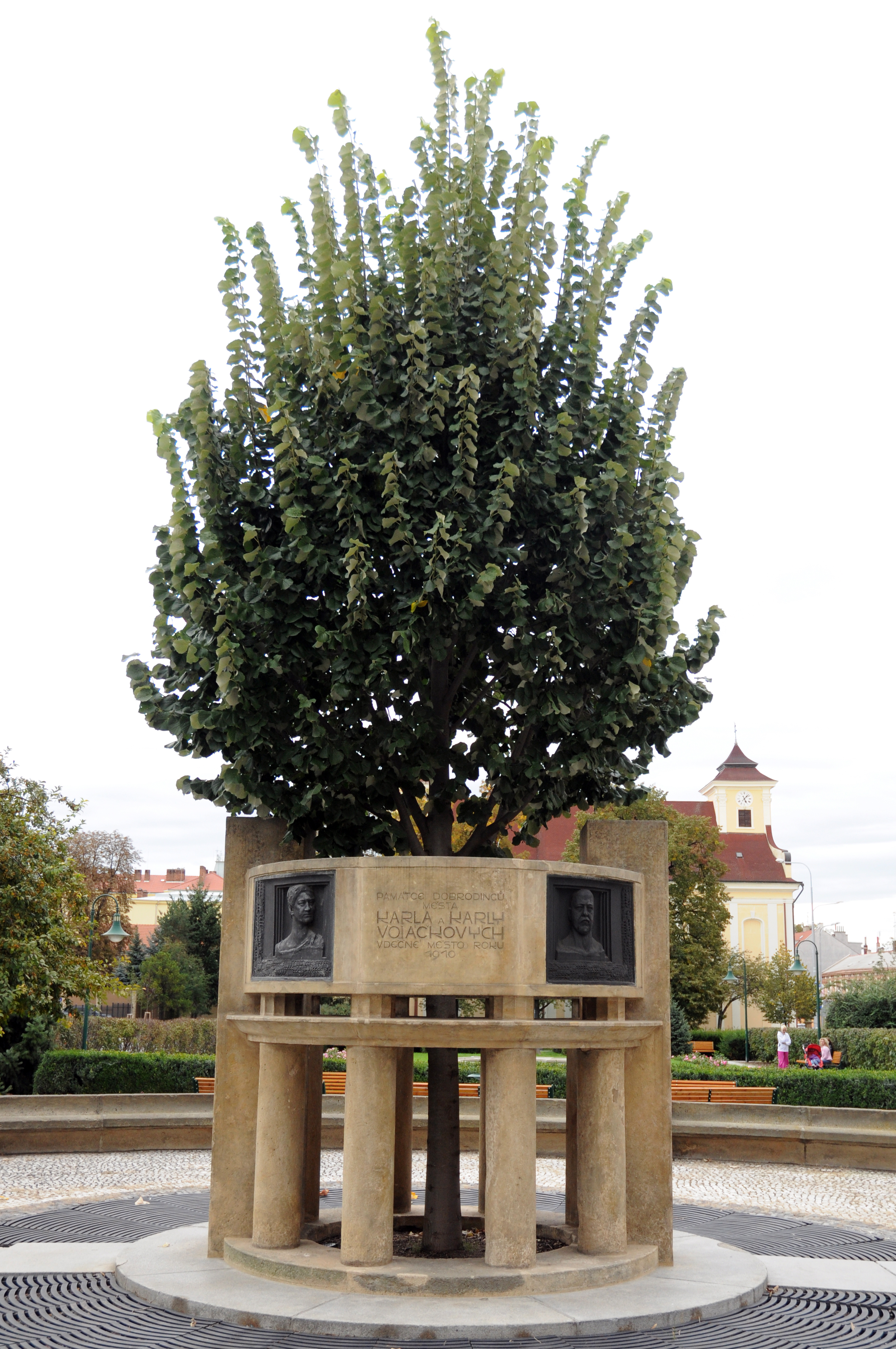
Vojáček family monument in front of the National House in Prostějov

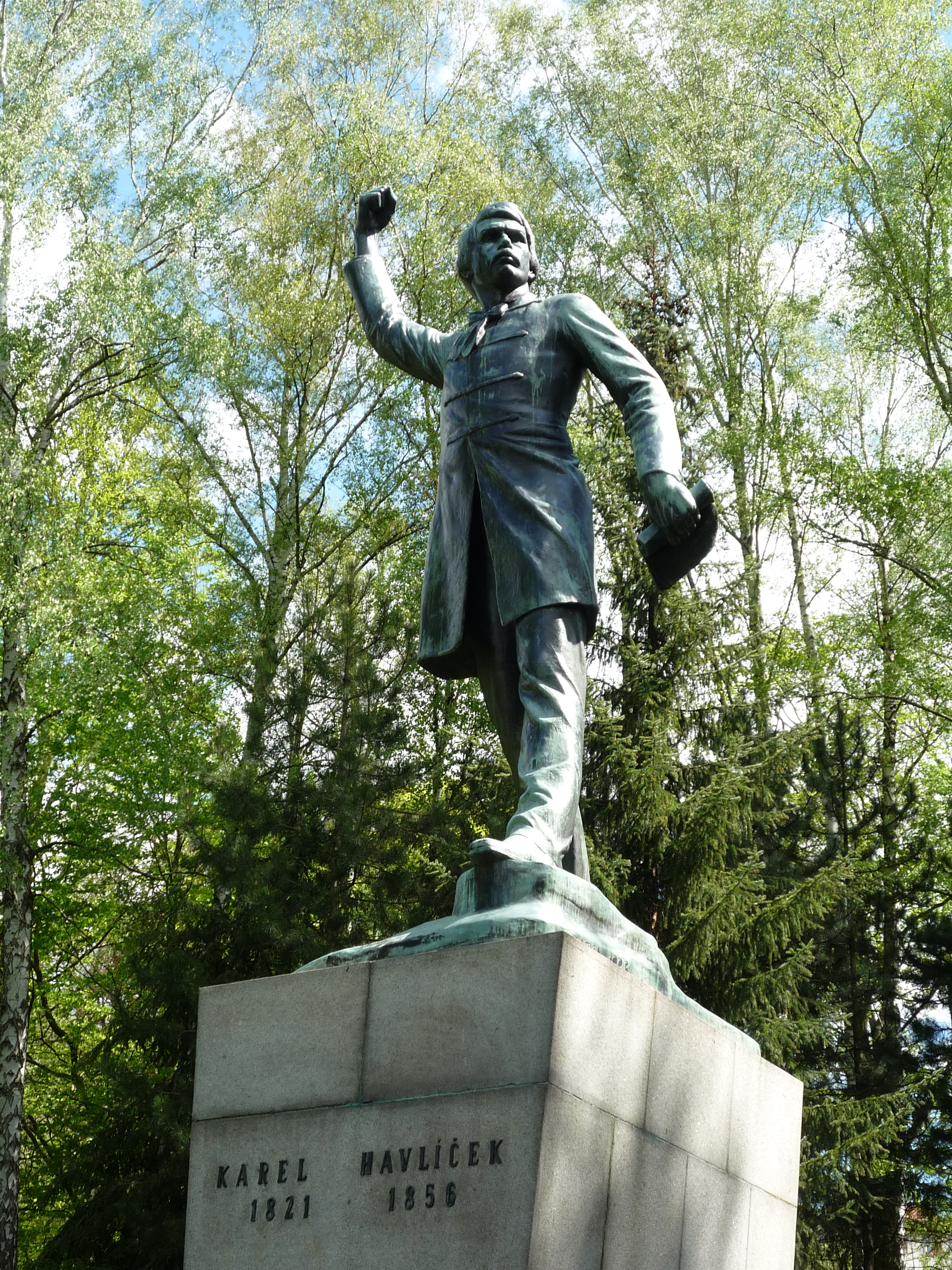
Statue of Karel Havlíček Borovský in Havlíčkův Brod
