= Jaroslav Brožek =

Czech painter and university educator (1923–2019)

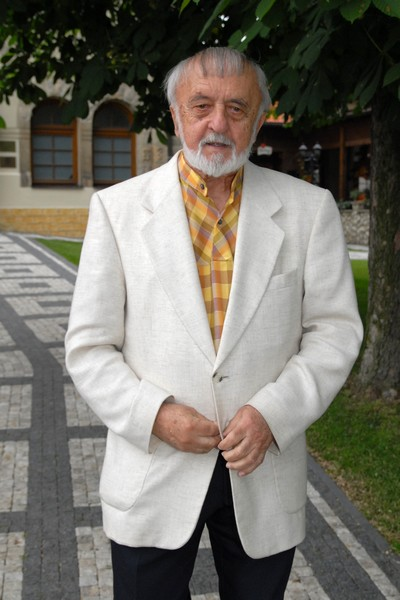
Dr. Jaroslav Brožek

Dr. Jaroslav Brožek, CSc. (6 February 1923, in Kněževes – 22 January 2019) was a Czech artist and professor of art, theorist in color theory, art teaching and methodologies. He authored a number of publications about color and its effects on human perception, and together with other authors he prepared textbooks for primary schools as well as art schools in the Czech Republic.

== Life ==
He attended a gymnasium in Jevíčko and Boskovice. Impressed by his teacher Bohdan Lacina, he decided to dedicate his life to art and education. In Prague, he studied art oriented at education at the Faculty of Education, Charles University in Prague in Cyril Bouda's, Martin Salcman's, and Karel Lidický's seminars. After graduating in 1949, he was sent to teach in Teplice in northern Bohemia.

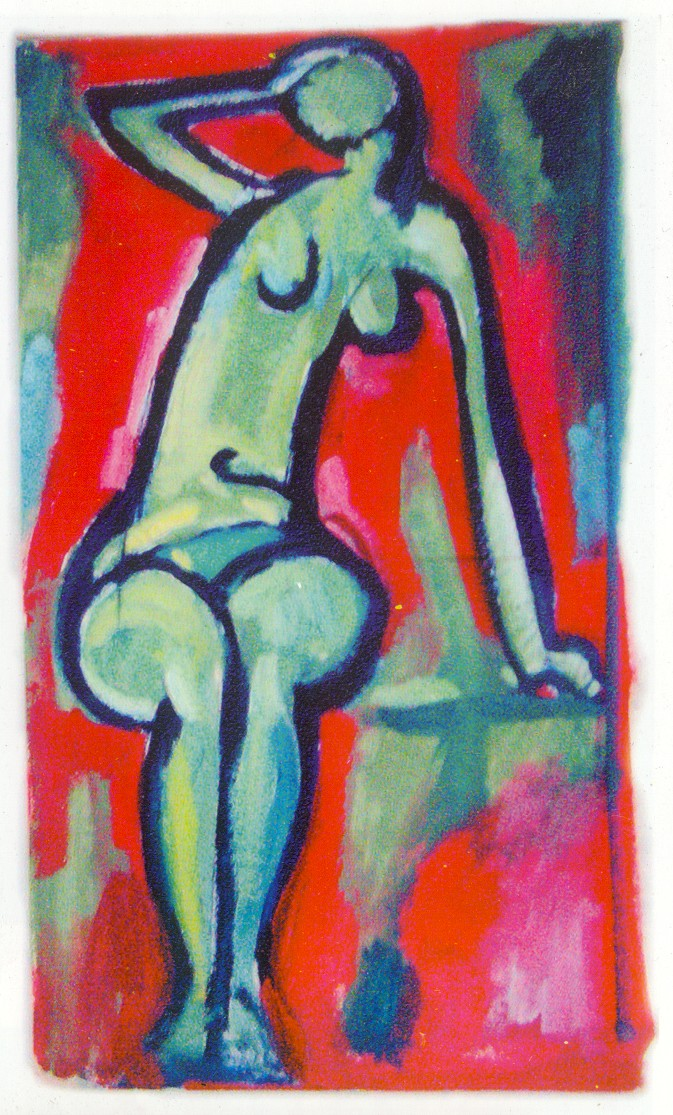
"Sitting Act", 1963, tempera, 64x36 cm;

In 1959 he was invited to establish (together with other colleagues) an educational module focused on art education at the Institute of Education in Ústí nad Labem, the future Faculty of Education at the Jan Evangelista Purkyně University in Ústí nad Labem. In addition to teaching, he has been researching the color theory, and lectured on this topic at several international conferences, e.g. in Lucerne, Dresden, and Stockholm. Later he has been awarded the Candidate of Sciences degree for his work in this field. In collaboration with other authors he published several arts textbooks. At that time he created a collection of tempera and watercolor paintings entitled "Holky" (Girls), painted landscapes and urban environments of northern Bohemia, and started to work on an extensive series of abstract oil paintings entitled The Systematic Research of the Colored Square, using his knowledge gained by studying the color theory.

In 1970, due to his expression of disagreement with the Warsaw Pact invasion of Czechoslovakia he was forced to retire from the Faculty of Education at the Jan Evangelista Purkyně University in Ústí nad Labem. After that, he has been teaching at elementary schools but in 1974 he was banned from all teaching activities. Therefore, Jaroslav Brožek worked as a signwriter in the state company Repro in Trmice near Ústí nad Labem. From this period originated the series of paintings of secluded places in Trmice, and some paintings from the series The Systematic Research of the Colored Square. At the same time he unofficially led groups of amateur artists, first in Ústí, later the group Kontakt in Litvínov. He started to work on publications dealing with the use of color in the work of art.

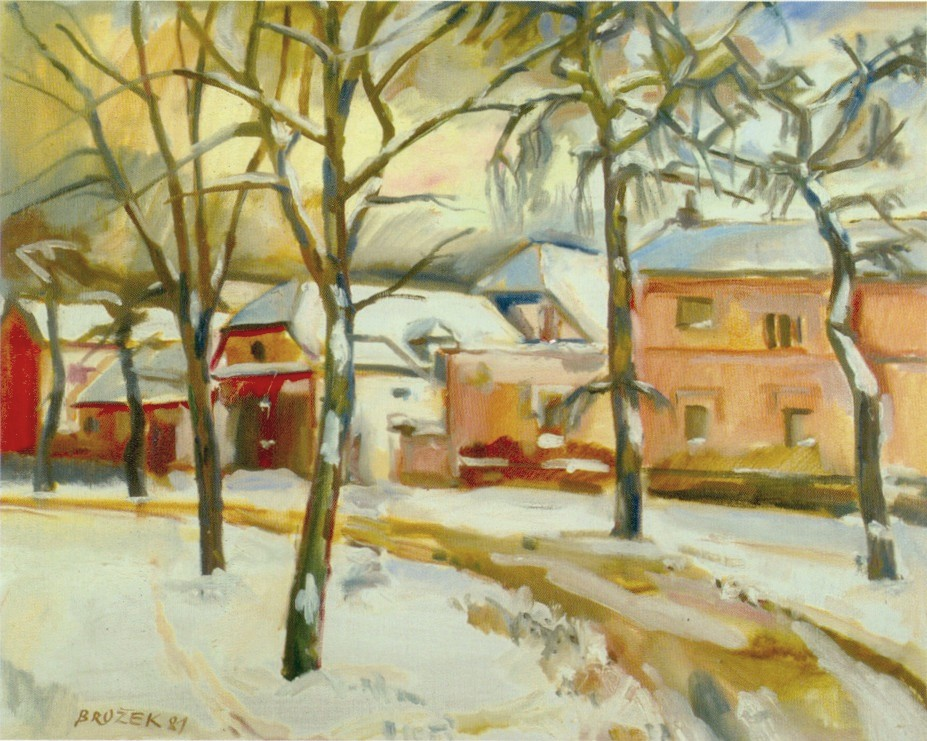
"Trmice, a former farm in the winter," 1981, oil, 50x65 cm

Some of them he was able to publish under the name of his wife ("The Adventures of color", "Color and painting"), or that of his colleague Josef Hron ("How to paint a landscape"). These publications became fundamental not only for schools teaching art but they are also used by amateur and professional artists.

In 1990, after the Velvet Revolution, Jaroslav Brožek was rehabilitated, and returned to teach at the Jan Evangelista Purkyně University in Ústí nad Labem. He was awarded the PaedDr. degree (Czech former degree awarded to doctors of education) by the Masaryk University in Brno. He became an associate professor at the Jan Evangelista Purkyně University in Ústí nad Labem, and in 1992 he was appointed a professor. He arranged a doctoral study program in Theory of art education for the university. In 2005 he retired for health reasons but he continued to supervise doctoral students. In addition to color theory, he devoted his time to regional historic sights and artists, writing many newspaper articles and a monograph Výtvarné Ústí, Kronika výtvarného života v Ústí nad Labem ve 20. století 1918 – 1998.

== Major exhibitions ==
- 1998 Galerie Emila Filly, Ústí nad Labem
- 2006 Regionální muzeum a galerie, Teplice
- 2008 Galerie Špejchar, Chomutov
- 2009 Muzeum Boskovicka, Boskovice
- 2011 Muzeum města Ústí nad Labem, Ústí nad Labem

== Publications ==
See the list of publications at the Czech version of this article.

== Literature ==
- BROŽEK, Jaroslav. Malířská tvorba, katalog. Ústí nad Labem: vydáno vlastním nákladem, 2006.
- Kdo je kdo 1991 Čechy, Morava, Slezsko 1.vyd. -- Praha : TV Spektrum, 1991. -- 207 s. : ISBN 80-85334-01-1
- Kdo je kdo v České republice 94/95. -- Praha : Modrý jezdec, 1994. -- 719 s. : ISBN 80-901631-2-2
- Kdo je kdo v České republice na přelomu 20. století : 5000 biografických hesel nejvýznamnějších osobností—Praha : Agentura Kdo je kdo, 1998. -- 735 s.
- Kdo je kdo = Who is who : osobnosti české současnosti : 5 000 životopisů. -- Praha : Agentura Kdo je kdo, 2002. -- 781 s. : ISBN 80-902586-7-0
- KDO JE KDO – OSOBNOSTI ČESKÉ SOUČASNOSTI Praha : Agentura Kdo je kdo, 2005, 776 str. : ISBN 80-902586-9-7,

== See also ==
- List of Czech painters
