= Cyril Bouda =

Czech painter, graphic artist, illustrator, and university professor

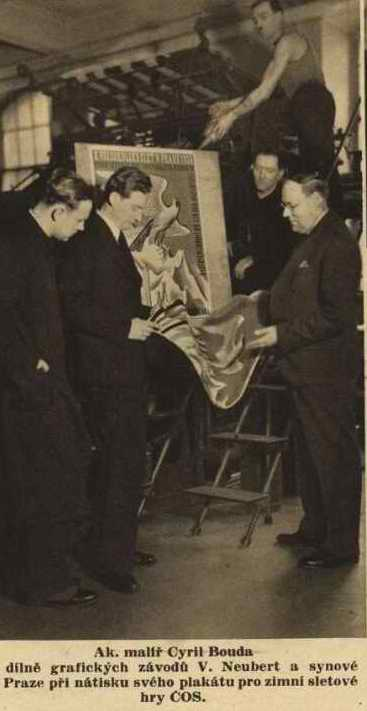
- Bouda in 1938 (2nd from left)
- Born: 14 November 1901; Kladno, Kingdom of Bohemia
- Died: 29 August 1984 (aged 82); Prague, Czechoslovakia
- Education: Academy of Fine Arts in Prague
- Style: Painting, graphic art

Cyril Bouda, christened Cyrill Mikoláš Bouda (14 November 1901 – 29 August 1984), was a Czech painter, graphic artist and illustrator, professor at CTU and at Charles University in Prague.

== Life ==
Born in Kladno, Bouda lived most of his life in Prague. Both of his parents were artists; his father was a high school teacher of drawing, his mother Anna Boudová Suchardová (sister of sculptors Stanislav Sucharda and Vojtěch Sucharda) was an artist and industrial designer. Mikoláš Aleš, the well-known Czech painter, was his godfather.

In 1923 Bouda graduated from the School of Arts and Crafts in Prague under František Kysela, and in 1926 he completed his studies at the Academy of Fine Arts in Prague, where he studied under Max Švabinský. He was also an assistant to T. F. Šimon at the Academy of Fine Arts. Since 1932 he was a supply teacher of figurative drawing at the architecture department of the CTU. He was one of the professors of Bohuš Čížek, Jaroslav Brožek, Josef Liesler and others. In 1946–1972 he then worked as a teacher and later as a professor at the Faculty of Education of Charles University in Prague and in Brandýs nad Labem (1964–1972).

Among his students at Charles University was Jaroslav Weigel.

His son, Jiří Bouda, also became a graphic artist.

== Work ==
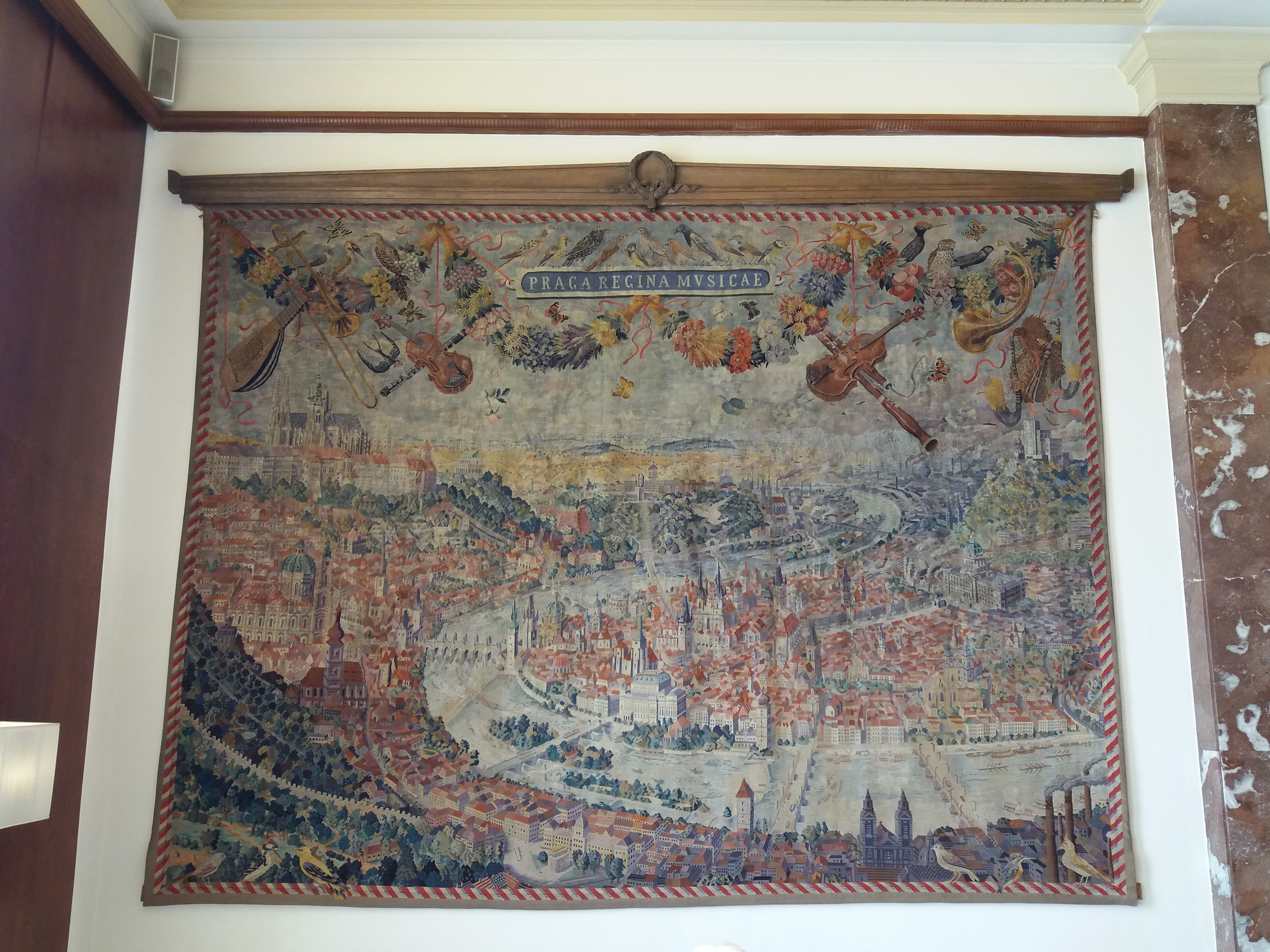
Tapestry by Cyril Bouda in Hotel International in Prague

At first he devoted himself to free graphics (drypoint, colour etching, lithography) and to painting pictures. However, he is known primarily as a versatile and very diligent author of applied graphics. Throughout his life he worked as a book illustrator, illustrating especially Czech fairy tales, legends, humorous and historical books (e.g. František Langer's Prague Legends, Václav Cibola's Old Prague Legends, Kocourkov). He also translated his illustrations into the form of cartoons (e.g. the fairy tale Hrnečku, cook!, 1953). He mastered many graphic techniques, woodcut and copperplate, etching and especially lithography. He was, among others, a graphic designer of Czechoslovak stamps. He also created designs for stained glass windows (in St. Vitus Cathedral, the window in the north aisle of Hilbert's Treasury, and the Church of St. Wenceslaus in Mcely) and a design for a panoramic tapestry of the city of Prague (Prague – the Mother of Cities, for the Hotel International Prague in Dejvice in 1958; a second version of the tapestry, without the infamous Stalin monument, was woven for the National Assembly building in Prague in 1960).

He also devoted himself to motifs from the surroundings of Třebíč, which he exhibited in 1961 in the then West Moravian Museum in Třebíč.
