= Pětipsy =

- Municipality
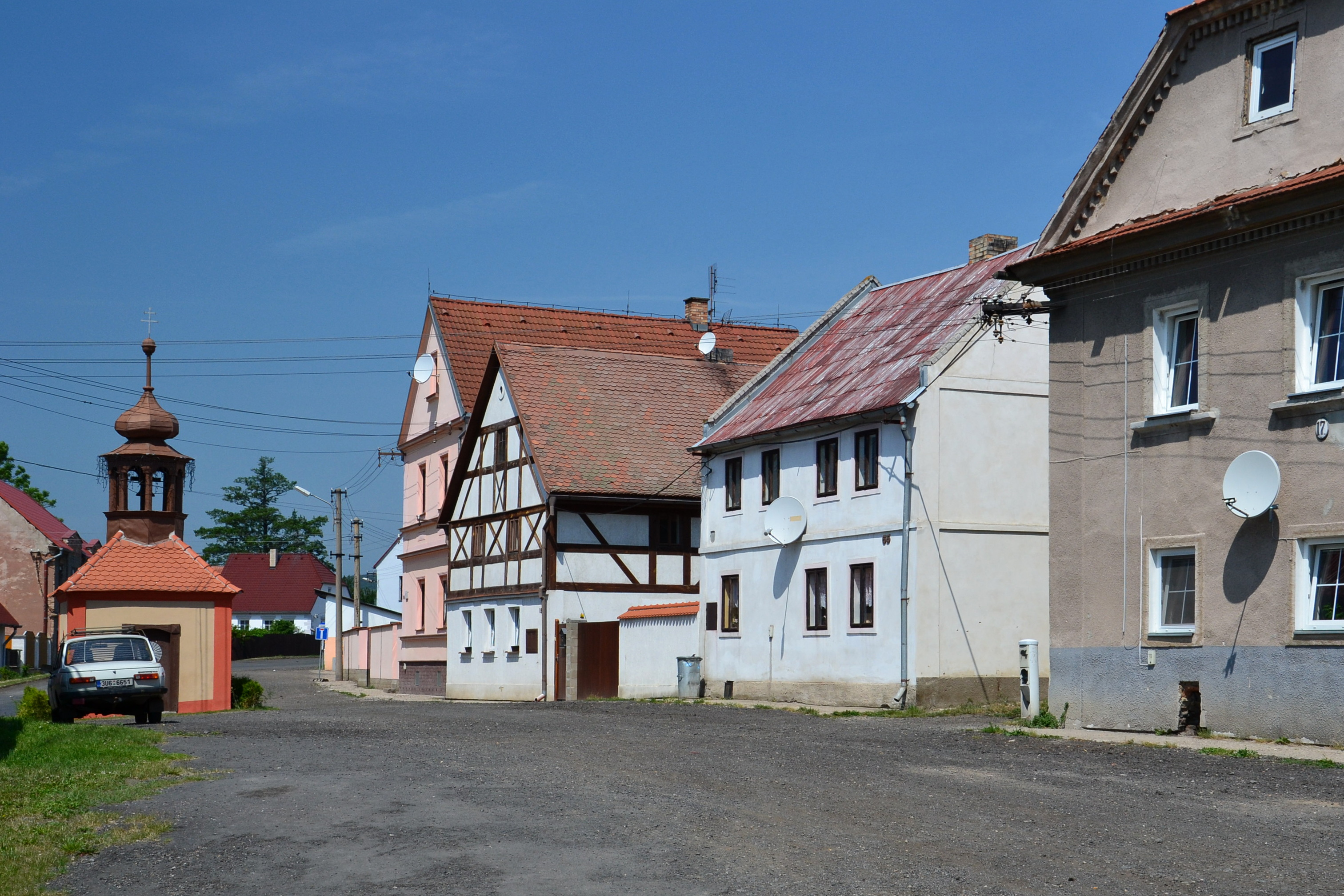
- Centre of Pětipsy

- Location in the Czech Republic
- Coordinates: 50°19′16″N 13°20′59″E
- Country: Czech Republic
- Region: Ústí nad Labem
- District: Chomutov
- First mentioned: 1226

Area
  - Total: 5.09 km^{2} (1.97 sq mi)
- Elevation: 268 m (879 ft)

Population (2026-01-01)
  - Total: 199
  - Density: 39.1/km^{2} (101/sq mi)
- Time zone: UTC+1 (CET)
  - Summer (DST): UTC+2 (CEST)
- Postal code: 431 53
- Website: www.petipsy.cz

Pětipsy (German: Fünfhunden) is a municipality and village in Chomutov District in the Ústí nad Labem Region of the Czech Republic. It has about 200 inhabitants.

== Administrative division ==
Pětipsy consists of two municipal parts (in brackets population according to the 2021 census):

- Pětipsy (176)
- Vidolice (13)

== Etymology ==
The name Pětipsy is derived from the expression u pěti psů (meaning 'at five dogs' in Czech). It was a nickname the settlement received from villagers from surrounding villages.

== Geography ==
Pětipsy is located about 16 kilometres (10 mi) south of Chomutov and 35 km (22 mi) east of Karlovy Vary. It lies in an agricultural landscape in the Most Basin. The highest point is at 320 m (1,050 ft) above sea level. The Liboc River flows through the municipality.

== History ==
The first written mention of Pětipsy is from 1226, when the village was donated to the convent in Doksany. Later it became a royal property. In 1332, Pětipsy was acquired by the Egerberg family, who had built here a fortress. They owned Pětipsy until the end of the 15th century, when the Lobkowicz family bought it and annexed to the Hasištejn estate. In 1518, the Lobkowiczs sold the village to Opl of Fictum. During his rule, the village prospered, but he counterfeited money here, which is why he had to flee in 1530. The village was subsequently confiscated by the royal chamber.

== Demographics ==
Historical population

Year	Pop.	±%
1869	821	—
1880	972	+18.4%
1890	861	−11.4%
1900	827	−3.9%
1910	759	−8.2%

Year	Pop.	±%
1921	762	+0.4%
1930	711	−6.7%
1950	394	−44.6%
1961	447	+13.5%
1970	289	−35.3%

Year	Pop.	±%
1980	212	−26.6%
1991	180	−15.1%
2001	191	+6.1%
2011	192	+0.5%
2021	189	−1.6%

Source: Censuses

== Transport ==
Pětipsy is located on the railway line Kadaň–Podbořany. However, trains run on the line only on weekends in the summer season.

== Sights ==
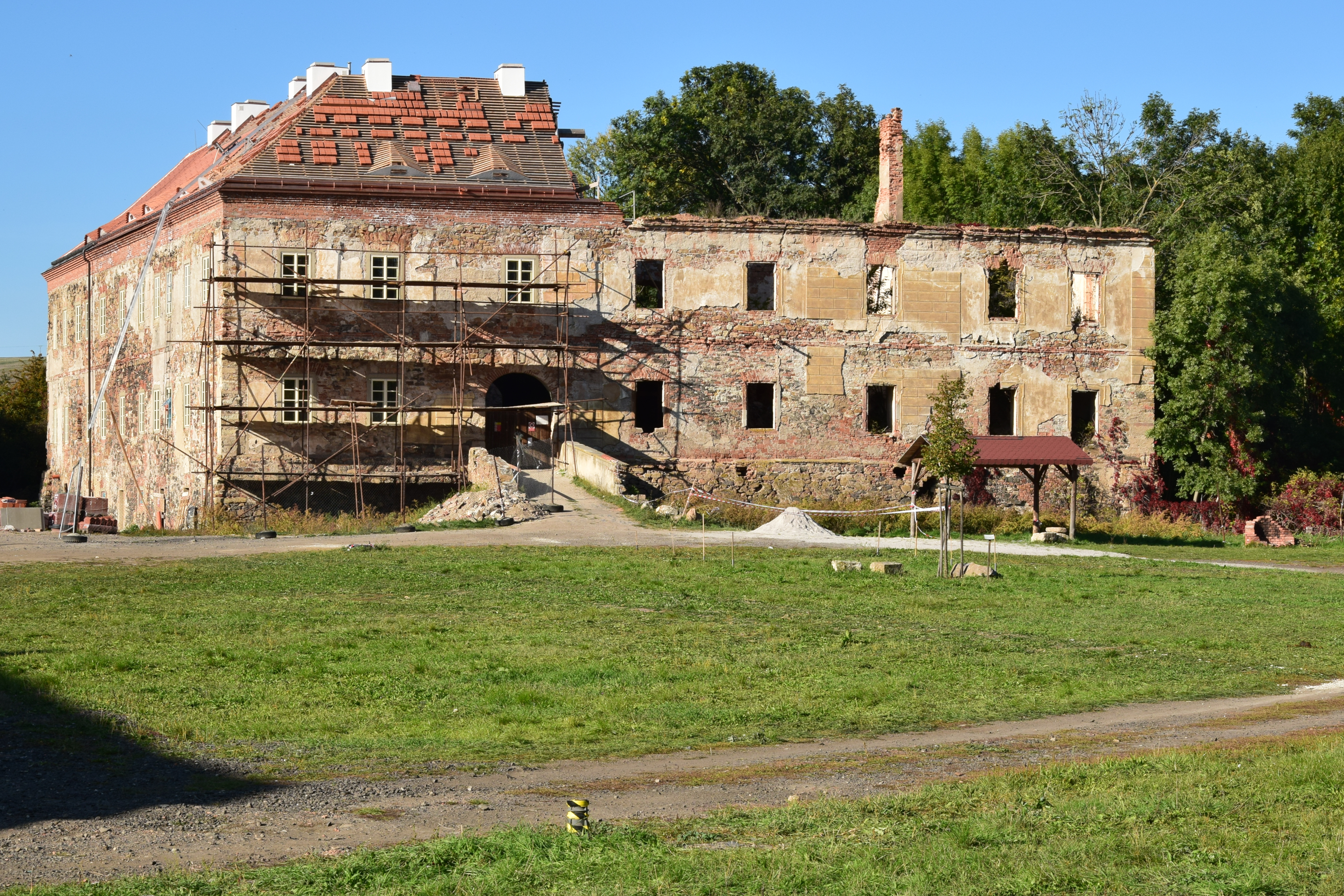
Pětipsy Castle

The main landmark of Pětipsy is the Pětipsy Castle. It was originally a Gothic fortress from 1332, rebuilt into a Renaissance castle in 1560. In 1733, it was modified in the Baroque style. Today the building is unused and in a desolate state.

== Notable people ==
- Josef Liesler (1912–2005), painter and illustrator
