= Nová Paka Brewery =

Czech brewery

Pivovar Nová Paka

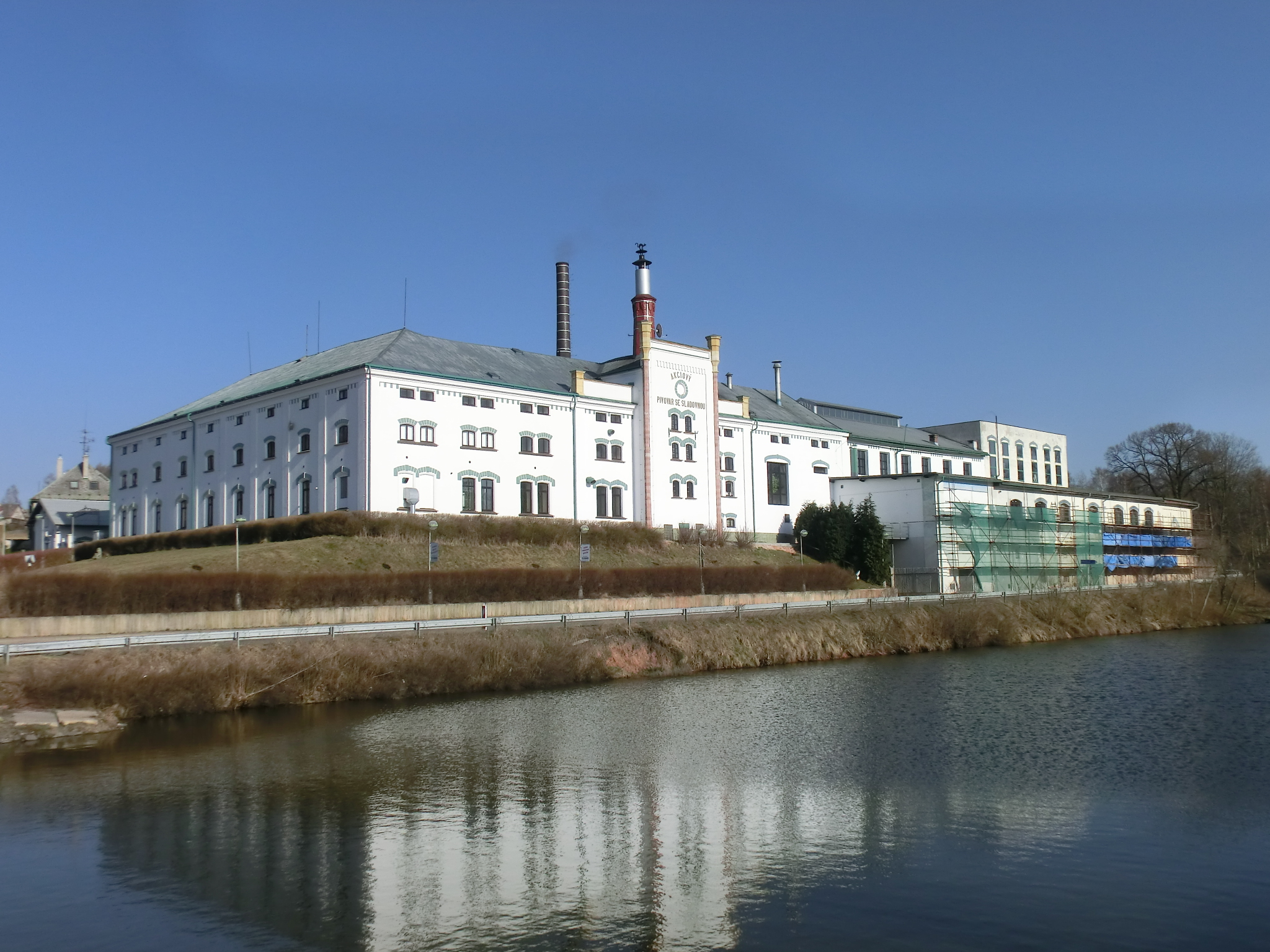
- Interactive map of Pivovar Nová Paka
- Location: Nová Paka; Czech Republic
- Coordinates: 50°29′14.12″N 15°31′27.92″E
- Opened: 1872
- Annual production volume: >20,000 hectolitres
- Owned by: Pivovar Nová Paka a.s.
- Website: www.novopackepivo.cz

Active beers
Name	Type
Brouček	Lager
Kryštof	Lager
Kumburák	Lager
Granát	Tmavý
Podkrkonošský speciál	Lager
Podkrkonošský speciál tmavý	Tmavý
Valdštejn	Lager
Hemp Valley Beer	Hemp Pilsner

The Nová Paka Brewery (Czech: Pivovar Nová Paka) is a brewery in the town of Nová Paka, in the Czech Republic.

== Beer ==
BrouCzech is a brand name for a range of beers made by Nová Paka.

The list includes:

- Brouček
- Kryštof
- Kumburak
- Granát
- Podkrkonošský speciál
- Podkrkonošský speciál tmavý (dark)
- Valdštejn
- Hemp Valley Beer
- BrouCzech beer

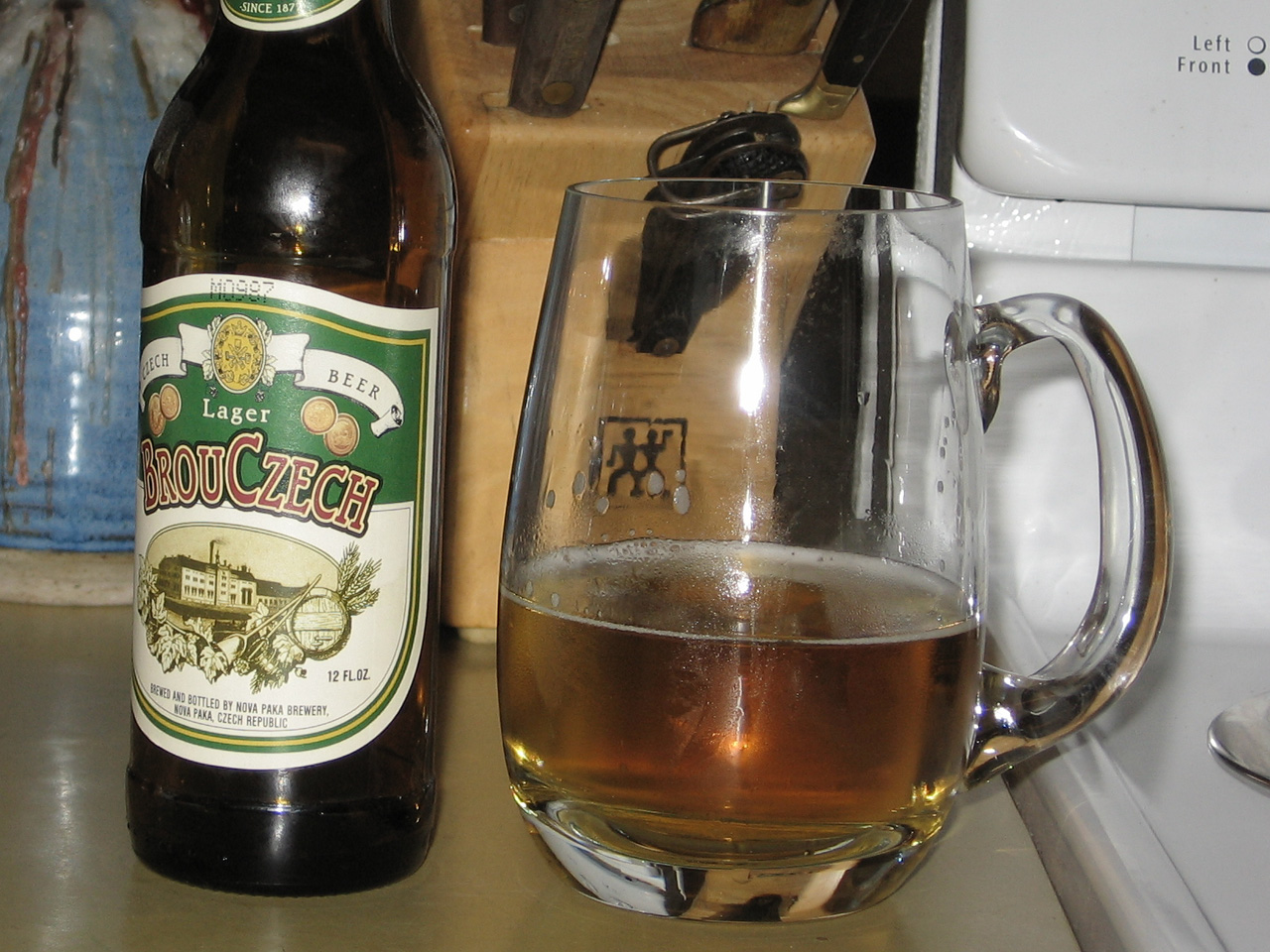
Czech beer in a Romanian mug.
