= Anna Boudová Suchardová =

Czech painter, ceramicist, textile artist and illustrator

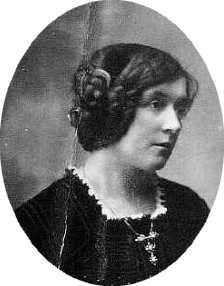
- Born: Anna Suchardová; 23 October 1870; Nová Paka, Bohemia, Austria-Hungary
- Died: 14 May 1940 (aged 69); Prague, Protectorate of Bohemia and Moravia
- Burial place: Bubeneč Cemetery
- Education: Prague School of Drawing and Painting for Ladies
- Occupations: Still life painter, ceramicist, textile artist and illustrator
- Spouse: Alois Bouda
- Children: Jaroslav Bouda and Cyril Bouda
- Father: Antonín Sucharda, Jr. (1843–1911)

Signature
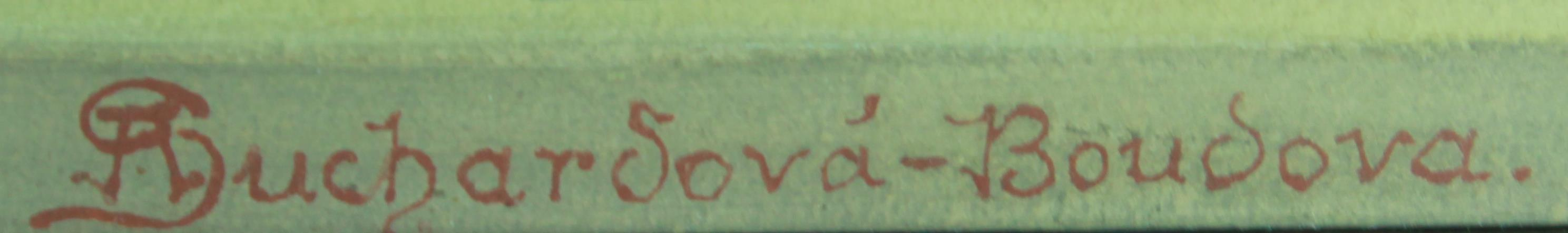

Anna Boudová Suchardová (23 October 1870 – 14 May 1940) was a Czech artist known as a still life painter, ceramicist, textile artist and book illustrator.

== Life ==
Anna Suchardová was born into an artistic family as the daughter of sculptor Antonín Sucharda, Jr. (1843–1911).

Suchardová was a student at the primary and middle schools in Nová Paka.She went on to attend the Women's Production Association (Zeichenschule zu Prag) where she was trained in handicrafts. During the years 1887–1889, she studied at the Prague School of Drawing and Painting for Ladies at the School of Applied Arts and then (1889–1893) at a special school for painting flowers with Jakub Schikaneder. She was the first female graduate of this art school.

She became a member of the American Ladies Club. She exhibited with SVU Mánes (1896–1900) and also with Krasoumná jednota and the Union of Fine Artists.

She married Alois Bouda, a professor at the high school who later took a position at an industrial school in Prague. When they married she added his name to hers becoming Anna Boudová Suchardová (sometimes hyphenated as Boudová-Suchardová and occasionally spelled Suchardová Boudová). The couple had two children, Jaroslav (1898–1919) and Cyril Bouda (1901–1984), who both studied at the Academy of Fine Arts. Jaroslav Bouda drowned as a young man after graduating from school.

=== Work ===
A lifelong theme of Suchardová's work were still-life depictions of flowers, initially in the Art Nouveau style, and later depicted realistically.

Suchardová made her debut as a still life artist at the Umělecká beseda exhibition (1897). She received the first prize of the arts magazine Volné směry, which staged a competition for a decorative line and showed the work of competing artists side-by-side in the magazine.

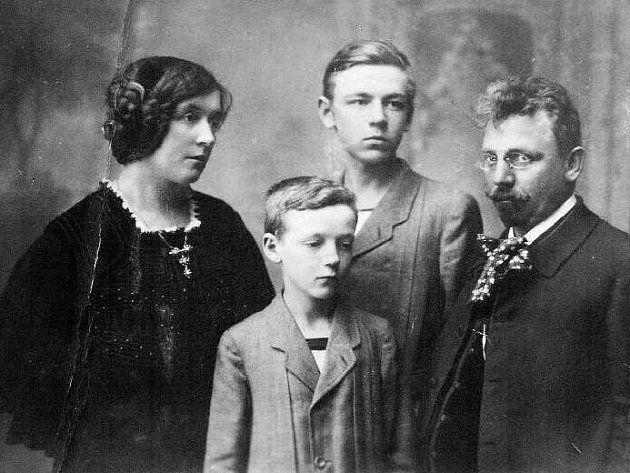
Anna Boudová Suchardová, sons Cyril and Jaroslav and husband Alois Bouda

Around 1900, she had become one of the most important creators of applied art. She participated in the decoration of the Zemská Banka on Příkopy street in Prague (1894–1895). At the World's Fair in Paris in 1900, she exhibited several ceramic vases featuring detail made from painted plastic, and she created decorative fillings on canvas in the national exhibition. She also created painted decorative festoons for Wilson's railway station (1908).

She painted several portraits in pastels and gained substantial notice in artistic circles by winning various art competitions. She was also the author of the ceramic decoration of Sucharda's house as well as the Church of St. Nicholas in her hometown, Nova Paka.

She presented watercolor and oil paintings of flowers at the exhibitions Krasoumné jednota and Jednota výtvarných výtvarných and designed postcards. She illustrated the textbook Mathioli's Herbarium (1931) and was the author of the book Decorative Flower in National Art.

Suchardová died in Prague in 1940. She is buried in the city's Bubeneč Cemetery in a family plot.

=== Personal life ===
Suchardová was born into the "famous Sucharda art family." She was:

great-granddaughter of painter and sculptor Jan Sucharda the Elder (1770–1820); granddaughter of sculptor and puppeteer Antonín Sucharda the Elder (1812–1886); daughter of sculptor Antonín Sucharda the Younger (1843–1911); sister of sculptor Stanislav Sucharda (1866–1916), sculptor and puppeteer Bohuslav Sucharda (1878–1927), sculptor and puppeteer Vojtěch Sucharda (1884–1968), painter Miroslava Suchardová (1889–1965); wife of Alois Bouda, pedagogue of the Kladno grammar school; mother of painter Cyril Bouda.

== Illustrations ==
- Dra Petr Ondřej Mathiol Natural Treatment (Herbarium or Herbalist), 1268 pages, 1052 illustrations, translation by Adolf Ambrož, color boards, A. Suchardová-Boudová, published by B. Kočí, 1931

== Gallery ==
Some of Suchardová's works are represented in the Museum of Applied Arts in Prague and the Mánes Union of Fine Arts.

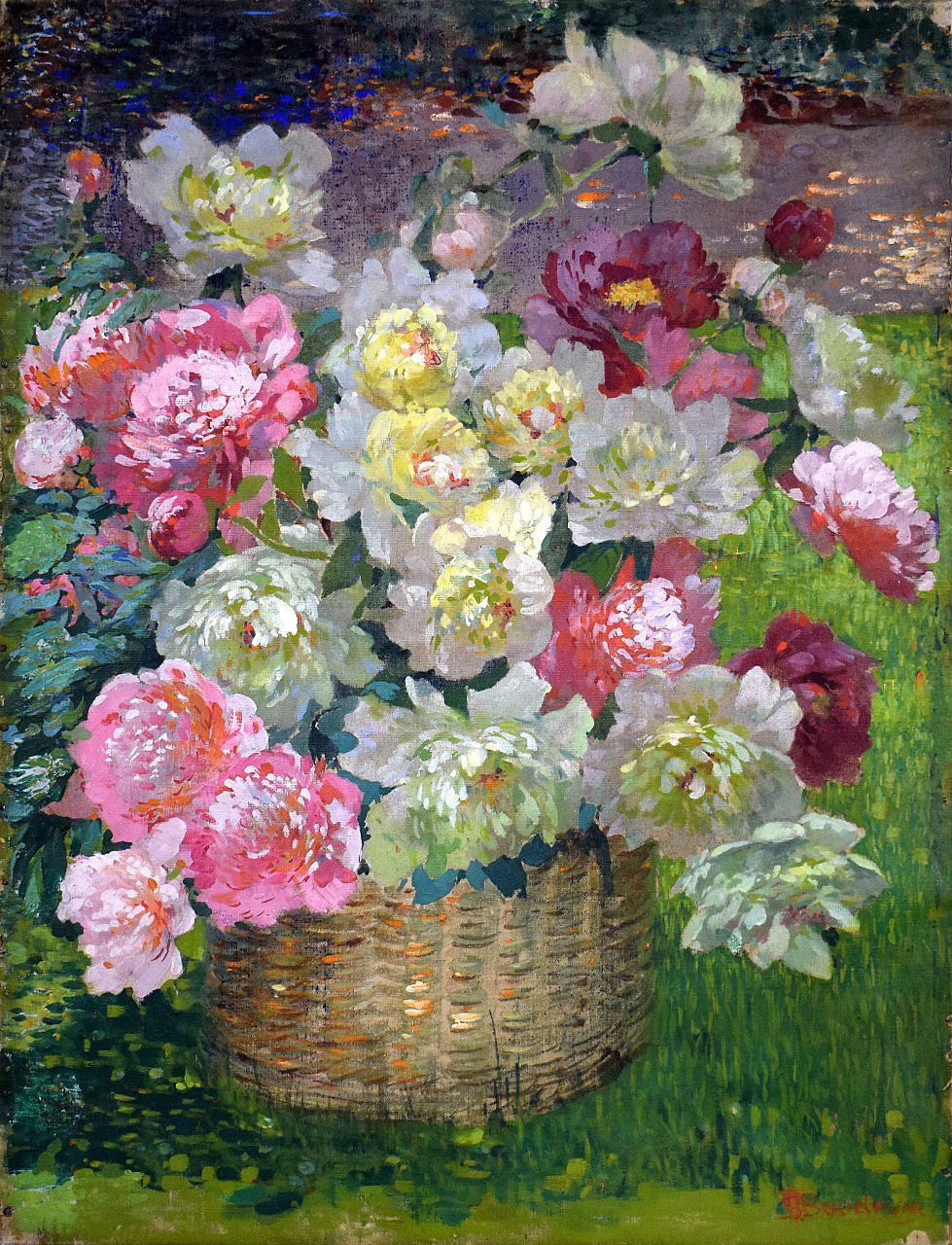
Bouquet in plein air. Oil on canvas.

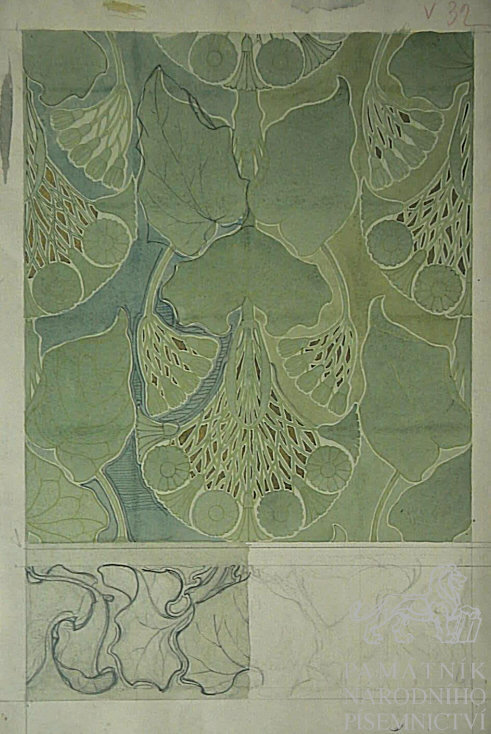
Design for wallpaper

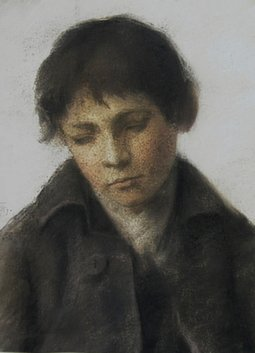
A likeness of a boy

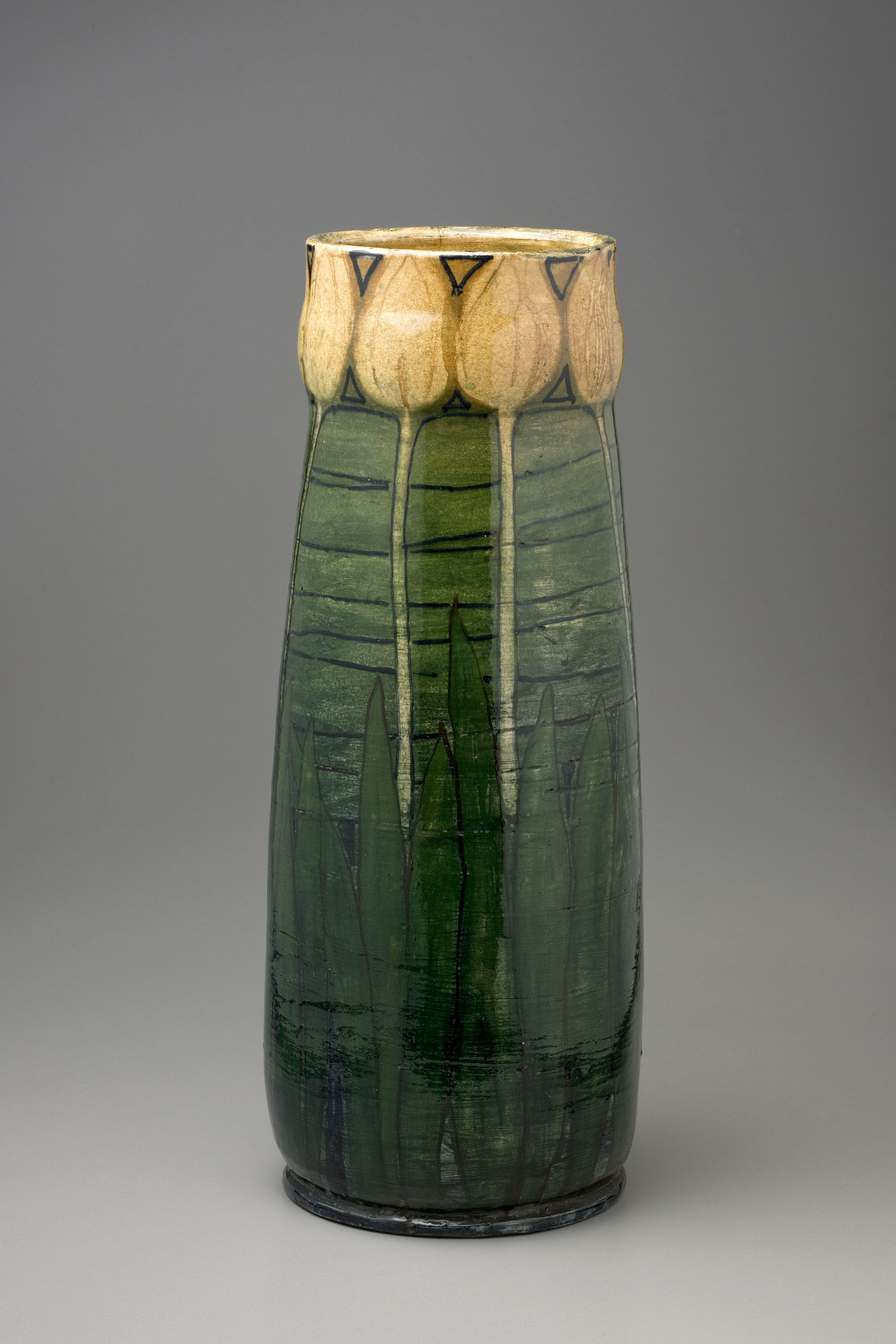
Vase

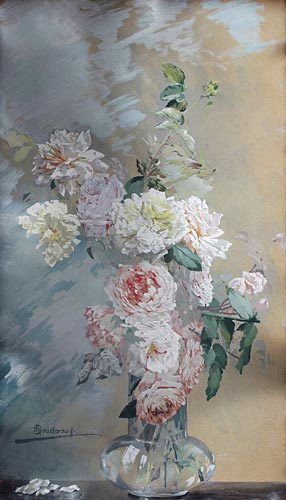
Bouquet

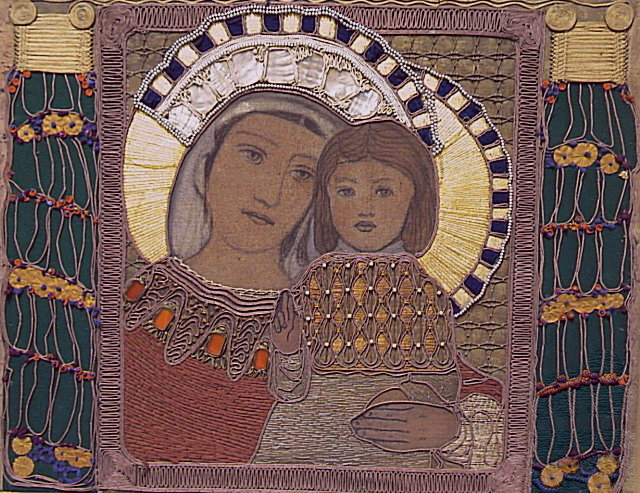
Madonna and Child Jesus (around 1900)
