= Josef Liesler =

Czech painter, graphic artist and illustrator

- Born: 19 September 1912; Vidolice, Bohemia, Austria-Hungary
- Died: 23 August 2005 (aged 92); Prague, Czech Republic

Signature
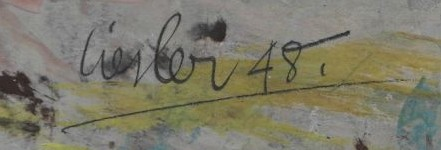

Josef Liesler (19 September 1912 – 23 August 2005) was a Czech surrealist painter, graphic designer, illustrator, exlibris and postage stamp designer.

== Life ==
Liesler was born on 19 September 1912, in Vidolice, Bohemia, Austria-Hungary (today part of Pětipsy, Czech Republic). He studied art at the Czech Technical University in Prague, Faculty of the Architecture and Structural Engineering, in 1934–1938 under professors Cyril Bouda, Oldřich Blažíček and Josef Sejpka. He became a member of the Mánes Union of Fine Arts (1942) and SČUG Hollar (1945). He illustrated over one hundred book titles and he created many drawings of postage stamps and exlibris. He received a UNESCO award for the finest stamp design (Hydrologic decade). His production is represented in many prominent Czech and international collections, including the Galleria degli Uffizi in Florence.

He was married to Blažena Málková and has two sons.

== Works ==
Liesler’s lithographs combine stylistic elements from different periods, merging traditional artistic techniques with contemporary subjects. In Schock im Louvre, for example, he juxtaposes a depiction of a female bather based on Jean-Auguste-Dominique Ingres with a punk woman observing the painting. His technically accomplished and symbolically charged works contain layers of references and allusions whose meanings are not immediately apparent. They invite viewers to engage intellectually with the images and explore their underlying meanings.
