= Kněževes (Blansko District) =

- Municipality
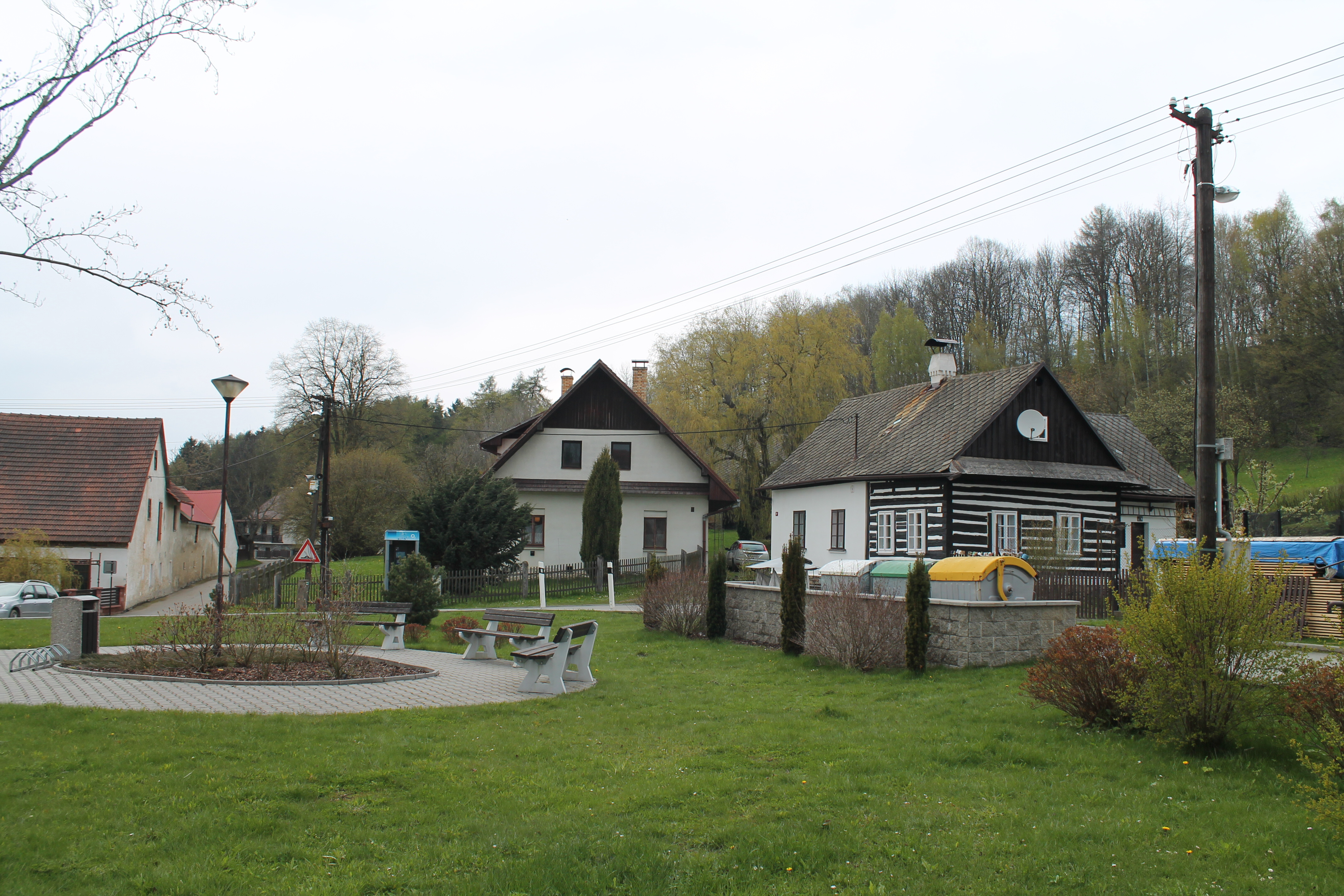
- Centre of Kněževes

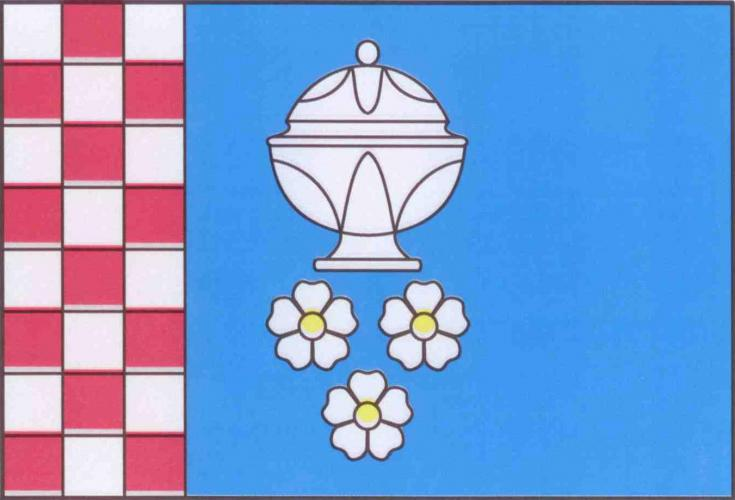
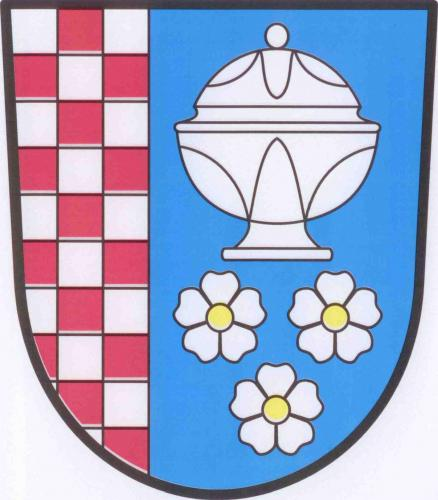
- Flag Coat of arms

- Location in the Czech Republic
- Coordinates: 49°35′13″N 16°25′26″E
- Country: Czech Republic
- Region: South Moravian
- District: Blansko
- First mentioned: 1416

Area
  - Total: 5.20 km^{2} (2.01 sq mi)
- Elevation: 573 m (1,880 ft)

Population (2026-01-01)
  - Total: 176
  - Density: 33.8/km^{2} (87.7/sq mi)
- Time zone: UTC+1 (CET)
  - Summer (DST): UTC+2 (CEST)
- Postal code: 679 74
- Website: www.knezeves.eu

Kněževes is a municipality and village in Blansko District in the South Moravian Region of the Czech Republic. It has about 200 inhabitants. The village of Veselka within the municipality is well preserved and is protected as a village monument zone.

Kněževes lies approximately 30 kilometres (19 mi) north-west of Blansko, 46 km (29 mi) north of Brno, and 155 km (96 mi) east of Prague.

== Administrative division ==
Kněževes consists of three municipal parts (in brackets population according to the 2021 census):

- Kněževes (115)
- Jobova Lhota (25)
- Veselka (19)

== Demographics ==
Historical population
Year	Pop.	±%
1869	449	—
1880	444	−1.1%
1890	419	−5.6%
1900	459	+9.5%
1910	462	+0.7%
1921	422	−8.7%
1930	417	−1.2%
1950	276	−33.8%
1961	290	+5.1%
1970	247	−14.8%
1980	235	−4.9%
1991	214	−8.9%
2001	191	−10.7%
2011	178	−6.8%
2021	159	−10.7%
Source: Censuses
