= Nová Paka =

- Town
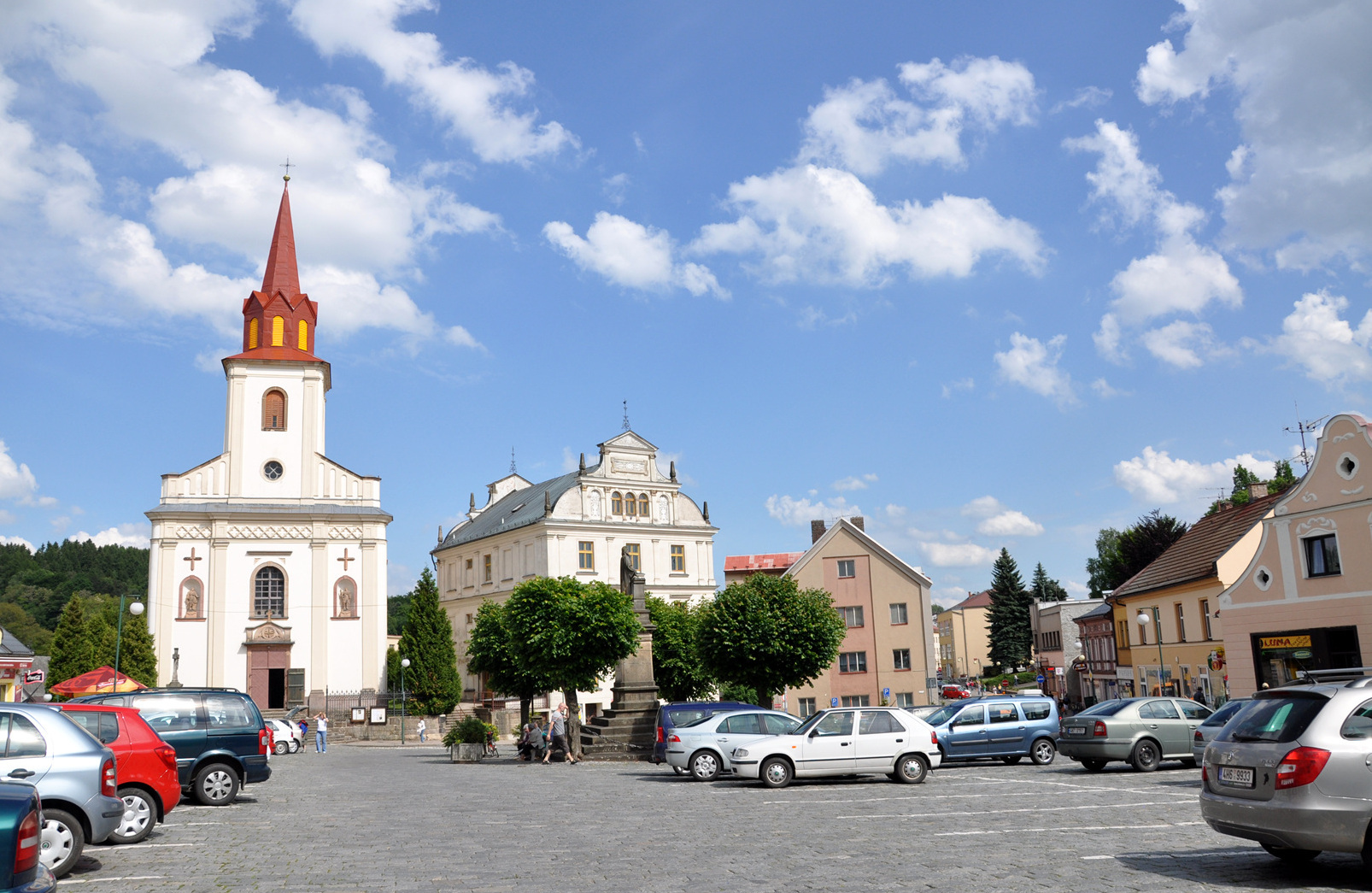
- Town square with Church of Saint Nicholas

- Flag Coat of arms

- Location in the Czech Republic
- Coordinates: 50°29′23″N 15°30′49″E
- Country: Czech Republic
- Region: Hradec Králové
- District: Jičín
- First mentioned: 1357

Government
  - Mayor: Pavel Bouchner

Area
  - Total: 28.68 km^{2} (11.07 sq mi)
- Elevation: 427 m (1,401 ft)

Population (2026-01-01)
  - Total: 8,834
  - Density: 308.0/km^{2} (797.8/sq mi)
- Time zone: UTC+1 (CET)
  - Summer (DST): UTC+2 (CEST)
- Postal code: 509 01
- Website: www.munovapaka.cz

Nová Paka (Czech pronunciation: [ˈnovaː ˈpaka]; German: Neupaka) is a town in Jičín District in the Hradec Králové Region of the Czech Republic. It has about 8,800 inhabitants. The town is located in the Giant Mountains Foothills.

Nová Paka is known as the birthplace of many important sculptors and other artists, especially the Sucharda family. The Sucharda's House is now an art gallery.

== Administrative division ==
Nová Paka consists of 13 municipal parts (in brackets population according to the 2021 census):

- Nová Paka (6,672)
- Heřmanice (356)
- Kumburský Újezd (209)
- Podlevín (171)
- Přibyslav (68)
- Pustá Proseč (15)
- Radkyně (55)
- Štikov (308)
- Studénka (106)
- Valdov (125)
- Vlkov (64)
- Vrchovina (355)
- Zlámaniny (26)

== Etymology ==
The name Paka appeared in its initial form as Paká. The meaning of the adjective paká is unclear. It probably meant 'opposite' (opačná in modern Czech), and probably referred to its location on the shady slopes, away from the sun. Already from the 14th century, two settlements (Stará Paka – 'old Paka' and Nová Paka – 'new Paka') were distinguished.

== Geography ==
Nová Paka is located about 13 kilometres (8 mi) northeast of Jičín and 37 km (23 mi) northwest of Hradec Králové. It lies in a hilly landscape in the Giant Mountains Foothills. The highest point is at 568 m (1,864 ft) above sea level. The Rokytka Stream flows through the town.

== History ==
The first written mention of Nová Paka is from 1357 with regard to the installation of new vicar to the Church of Saint Nicholas. During these times the town was called Mladá Paka ('young Paka').

In 1563, the almost entire town was destroyed by fire. In 1586, the plague killed approximately half of the citizens. Another 450 people died of plague in 1625. In 1643, during the Thirty Years' War, the town was pillaged by the Swedish army. A fire in 1666 destroyed the northern part on the town square.

== Demographics ==
Historical population

Year	Pop.	±%
1869	7,270	—
1880	7,097	−2.4%
1890	7,352	+3.6%
1900	8,141	+10.7%
1910	9,230	+13.4%

Year	Pop.	±%
1921	8,568	−7.2%
1930	8,949	+4.4%
1950	8,072	−9.8%
1961	8,398	+4.0%
1970	9,043	+7.7%

Year	Pop.	±%
1980	8,842	−2.2%
1991	9,380	+6.1%
2001	9,299	−0.9%
2011	9,140	−1.7%
2021	8,530	−6.7%

Source: Censuses

== Economy ==
Nová Paka is known for the Nová Paka Brewery.

== Transport ==
The I/16 road (the section from Trutnov to Jičín) runs through the town.

Nová Paka is located on the railway line Kolín–Trutnov. The town is served by two train stations, Nová Paka and Nová Paka město.

== Sights ==
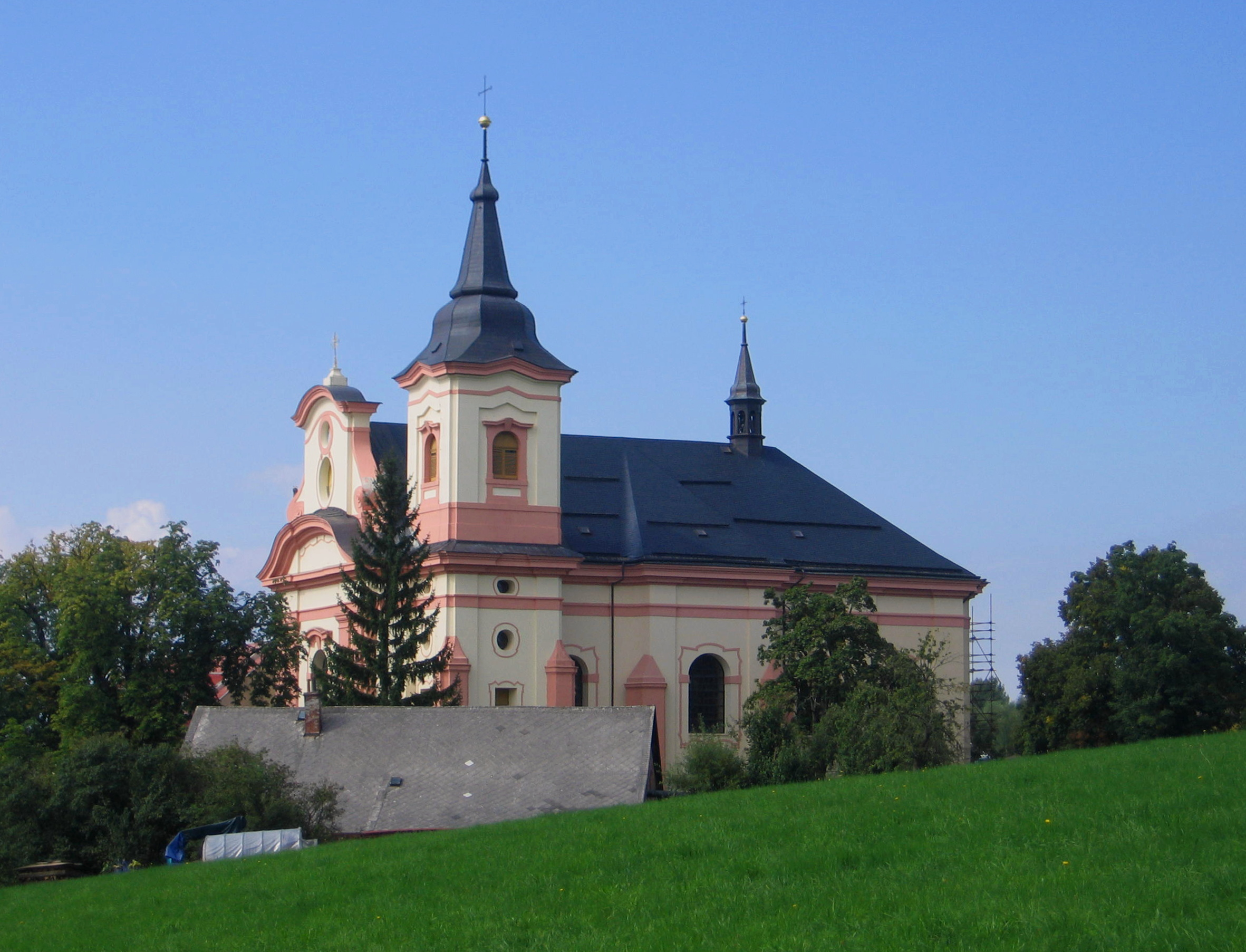
Church of the Assumption of the Virgin Mary

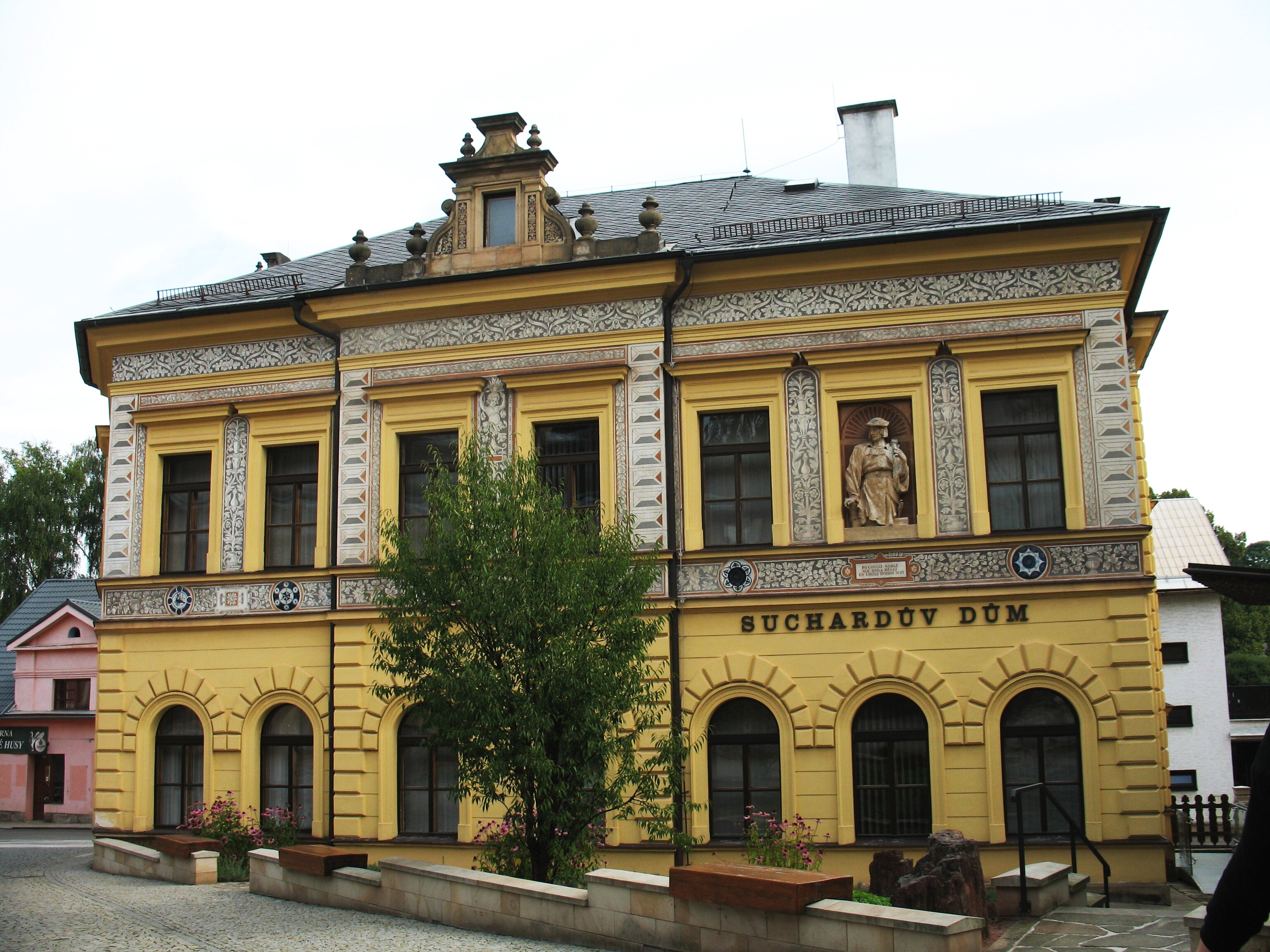
Sucharda's House

The Church of Saint Nicholas was first mentioned in 1357 and rebuilt in the Neo-Gothic style in 1872. The Marian Holy Trinity column is from 1716 and is the oldest statue in the town. On the square are a fountain from 1814 and a monument to Jan Hus from 1898.

Thanks to the legend of finding a miraculous statue of the Virgin Mary, the Minim monastery was established in the second half of the 17th century. The Church of the Assumption of the Virgin Mary was built in 1709–1724 and made Nová Paka a pilgrimage site. After the religious reform of Emperor Joseph II, the monastery was closed in 1785. From 1872, the premises served as a hospital. Today it houses social services.

The Chapel of Our Lady of Sorrows is a cemetery chapel built in 1700–1709. The Church of the Transfiguration of Jesus and Saint Nicholas is a wooden Greek Catholic church that was transferred to Nová Paka from Carpathian Ruthenia in 1930.

Sucharda's House is a Neo-Renaissance house, built in 1895–1896. It belonged to the Sucharda family, from which many notable sculptors, woodcarvers and painters came. Nowadays there is a historic exposition and an art gallery of artists from the region.

== Notable people ==
- Stanislav Sucharda (1866–1916), sculptor and professor of arts
- Anna Boudová Suchardová (1870–1940), artist
- Bohumil Kafka (1878–1942), sculptor
- Vojtěch Sucharda (1884–1968), sculptor, woodcarver and puppeteer
- Ladislav Zívr (1909–1980), sculptor
- Miroslav Hák (1911–1978), photographer
- Naďa Urbánková (1939–2023), singer and actress
- Jiří Horáček (born 1945), theoretical physicist
