= Kozel Castle =

Castle in Šťáhlavy, Czech Republic

Coordinates: 49°40′13.36″N 13°31′50.27″E

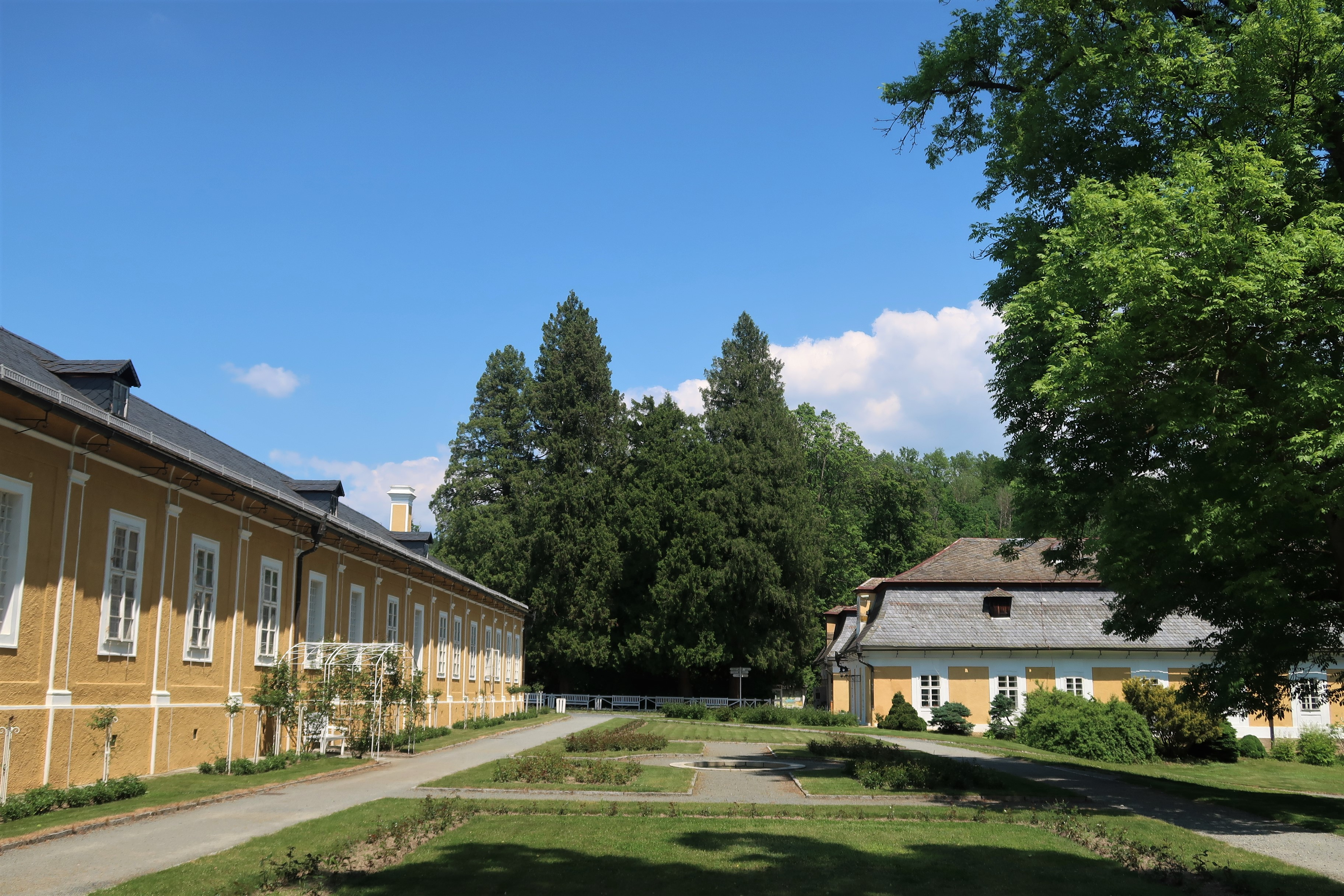
Kozel Castle

Kozel Castle (Czech: Zámek Kozel) is a hunting castle in Šťáhlavy near Plzeň in the Czech Republic from the 18th century.

== History ==
The castle was built in the Neoclassical style in 1784–1879. It was designed by architect Václav Haberditz for Jan Vojtěch of Czernin. It is a ground-floor building around an inner rectangular court. In the 1990s, the castle was expanded by another four buildings – the Chapel of the Holy Cross, the riding hall, servants' quarters and the stables. The castle complex includes a large park from the 19th century.
