= Stanislav Sucharda =

Czech sculptor

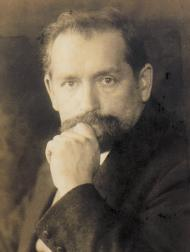
Stanislav Sucharda

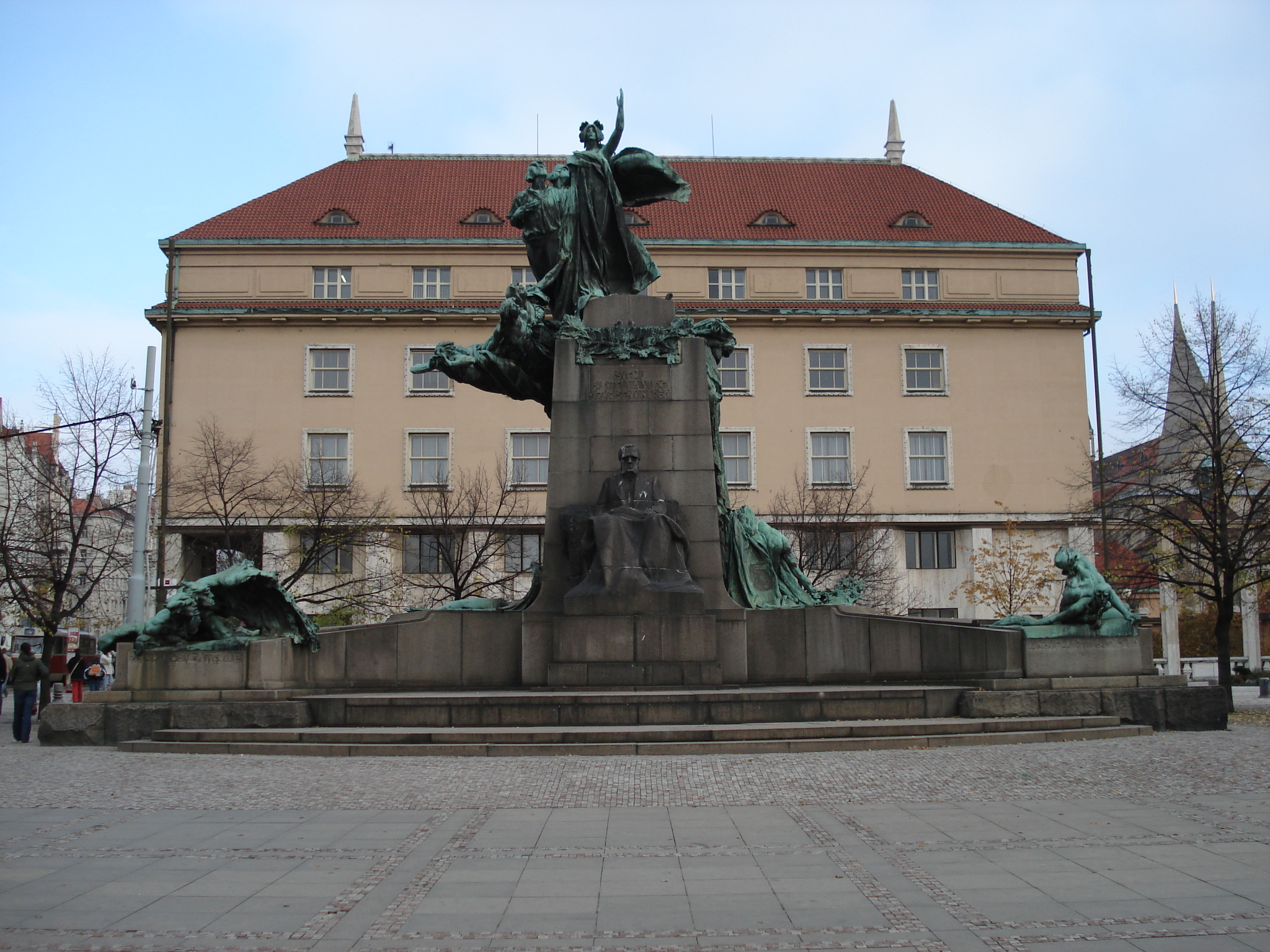
Monument to František Palacký

Stanislav Sucharda (12 November 1866 in Nová Paka – 5 May 1916 in Bubeneč) was a Czech sculptor. He was a professor at the Prague School of Applied Arts from 1899, and a leading figure in the Mánes Union of Fine Arts (S.U.V. Mánes), founded in 1887.

His work can be seen at the František Palacký Monument in the New Town, Prague, and architectural sculpture on several Art Nouveau buildings for Czech architects Osvald Polívka and Jan Kotěra, notably Polívka's New City Hall in Prague. He also designed a monument to Czech composer Karel Bendl, which stands in Prague-Bubeneč.

Stanislav Sucharda was the brother of sculptor and puppeteer Vojtěch Sucharda and artist Anna Boudová Suchardová.

Sucharda died on 5 May 1916 in Bubeneč (that time a separate city, today a part of Prague). He is buried at the Vyšehrad Cemetery in Prague.
