= Vojtěch Sucharda =

Czech sculptor

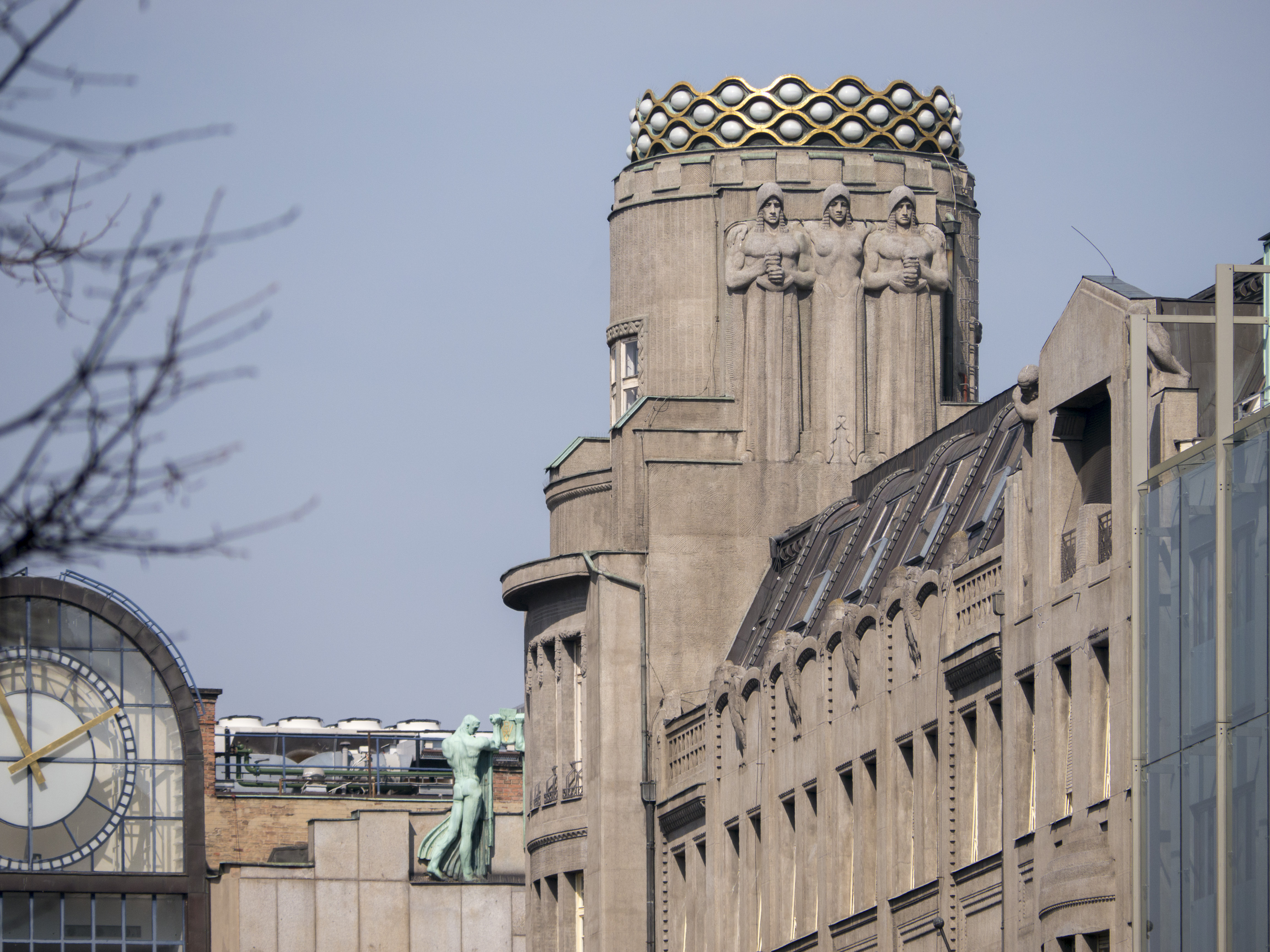
Koruna Palace with the three figures by Vojtěch Sucharda

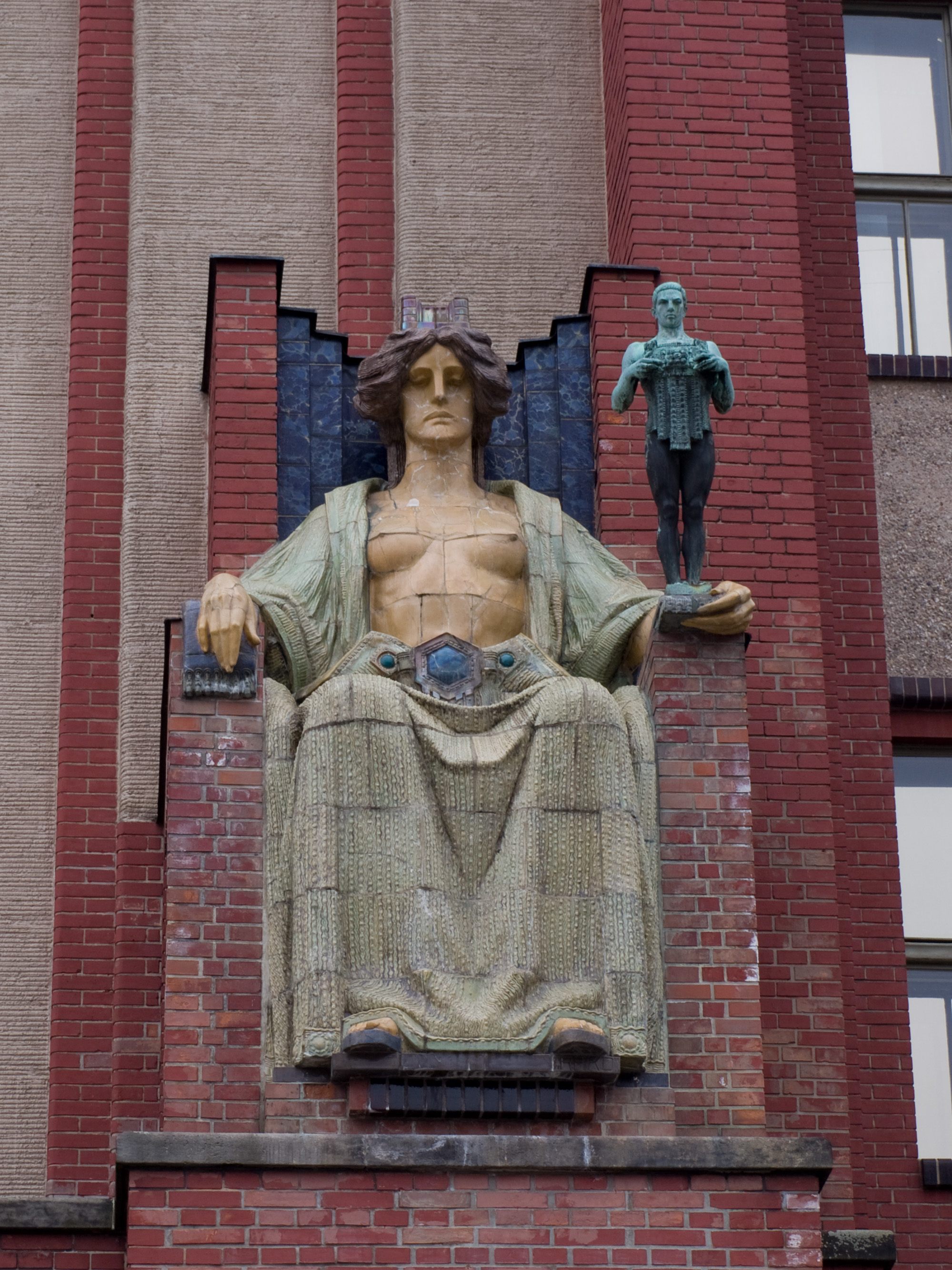
Sculpture at the Museum of Eastern Bohemia in Hradec Králové

Vojtěch Sucharda (6 January 1884, in Nová Paka – 31 October 1968, in Prague) was a Czech sculptor, woodcarver and puppeteer.

== Life ==
Sucharda was born into an artistic family as the son of sculptor Antonín Sucharda, Jr. (1843–1911). He was the brother of sculptor Stanislav Sucharda (1866–1916), artist Anna Boudová Suchardová (1870–1940), sculptor and puppeteer Bohuslav Sucharda (1878–1927) and painter Miroslava Suchardová (1889–1965).

== Career ==
In 1913 Sucharda was invited to collaborate on plastics for the Koruna Palace at the Wenceslas Square. He made his possibly most important work, three monumental figures of soldiers, and the ornamental crown on the top. Sucharda was the founder of Prague's Říše Loutek Theatre ("Puppet Empire") in 1920, where all the Sucharda family had worked for almost forty years. He is known for restoring the wooden figures of the apostles on the Prague Astronomical Clock, which had been heavily damaged by enemy fire in mid-May 1945.

Sucharda wrote a letter detailing the difficult conditions in Prague at the time, which he hid in a metal case inside the restored statue of the apostle St. Thomas. His hidden message was discovered 70 years later in 2018, when restorers noticed that one of the statues was heavier than the rest and an x-ray revealed the hidden message.

=== Work ===
As an architectural sculptor, Sucharda's work includes:

- the two seated figures flanking the entrance to the Museum of Eastern Bohemia in Hradec Králové, for architect Jan Kotěra, 1908–1912
- the three figures at the crown of the Koruna Palace at the Wenceslas Square in Prague, 1912–1914
- work at the St. Vitus Cathedral, Prague
