= Špalkův obchodní dům =

Coordinates: 50.2098°N 15.8339°E

Špalek Department Store
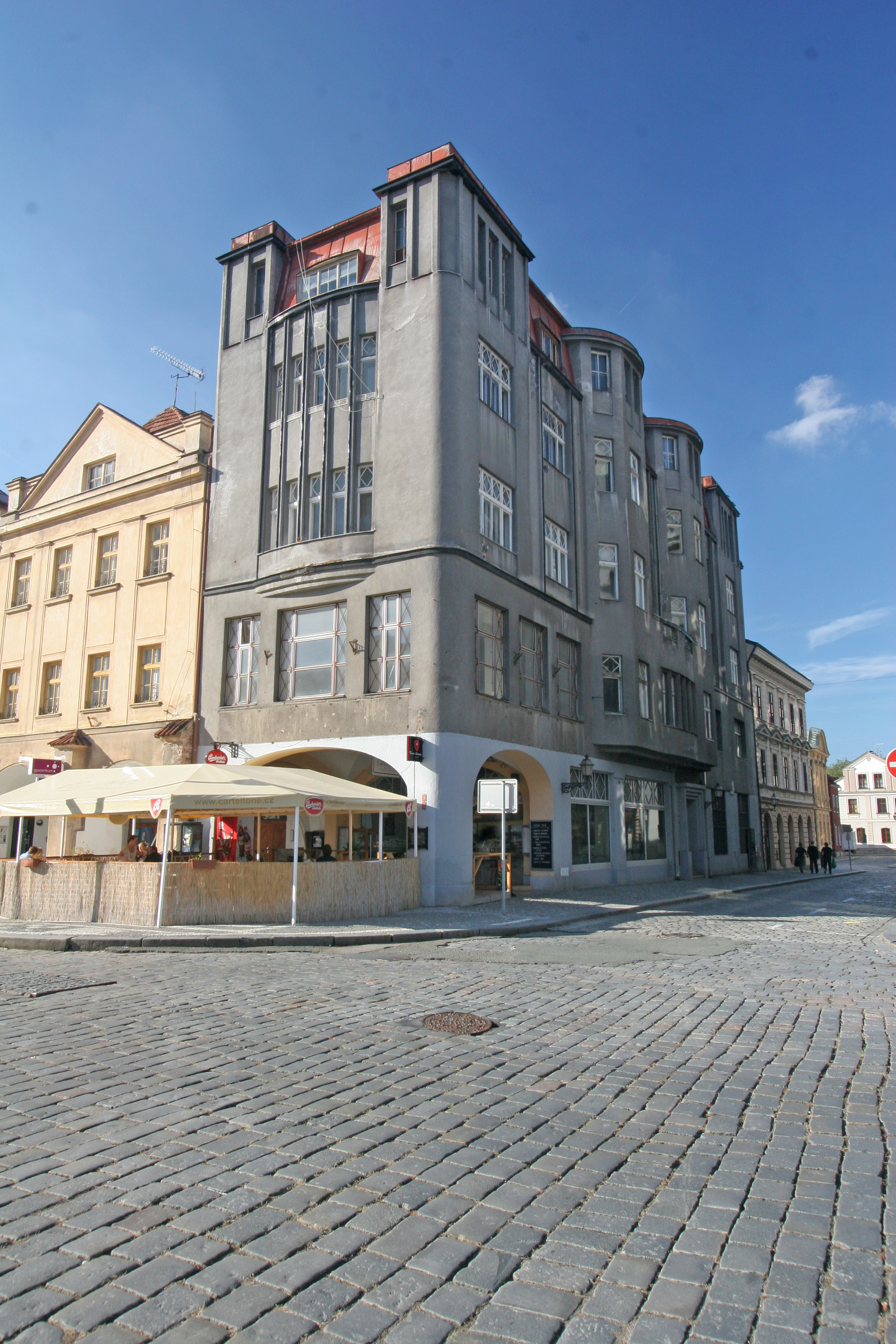

General information
- Location: Velké náměstí, Hradec Králové
- Completed: Early 20th century

Design and construction
- Architect(s): Vladimír Fultner

Špalkův obchodní dům (English: 'Špalek Department Store') is a modernist commercial building with apartments in Hradec Králové, Czech Republic. It was built at the beginning of the 20th century by architect Vladimír Fultner for the textile merchant Václav J. Špalek on the square Velké náměstí.

Although the building has been referred to as a department store since its inception, it has always been primarily a residential building, with only its ground and second floors serving for commercial purposes. This is typical for Hradec Králové, where civic amenities were located on the ground floors of residential buildings due to the city's former military fortification status until 1893. Multi-story exclusively commercial buildings, such as Breda Department Store in Opava, did not emerge until the 1970s in Hradec Králové.

== History ==
Merchant Václav J. Špalek owned a house at the corner of Velké náměstí and Klicperova ulice, which burned down in July 1910. Špalek commissioned architect Vladimír Fultner to design a new building. Due to the narrow original medieval plot, Fultner decided to orient the main façade of the new building not towards the square but towards Klicperova street.

Špalek Department Store was designed as a five-storey corner house with two entrances and an ornamental façade. Despite facing critique from Klub Za starou Prahu (Club for old Prague) and the architect Jan Kotěra, who regarded the proportions of the construction unreasonable, the design was accepted and built by Josef Jihlavec in 1911. In the 1930s, the building was taken over by the company Baťa. The house was declared a cultural monument in 1958.

In the 21st century, the building was unused for several years and started to decay but a total reconstruction of the house and its conversion into living spaces took place in 2020.

== Architecture ==
The house has five floors. The façade towards the square is axially symmetrical, with an arcade in the ground floor and three large windows on the first floor. The higher floors are distinguished by a risalit with each storey containing five narrow windows. The roof forms a mansarda from which a dormer emerges. At the ends of the façade, there are two corner towers.
