= Franz Fiedler =

German photographer (1885–1956)

Franz Fiedler (17 February 1885 – 5 February 1956) was a German photographer.

== Biography ==
Fiedler was born in Prostějov in Moravia, Austria-Hungary and started working as a photographer there. Fiedler was a student of Hugo Erfurth.

His father, Granz Fiedler Sr., and sister, Jana Jeništová-Fiedlerová, were photographers as well.

Fiedler died on 5 February 1956 in Dresden.

== Career ==
He was regarded as an eccentric during his apprenticeship in Plzeň, and worked in 1905 and again in 1912 with Rudof Dührkoop in Hamburg, and from 1908 to 1911 with Hugo Erfurth in Dresden.

At the 1911 world exhibition in Turin he won first prize and had another exhibition in Prague in 1913. He belonged to the circle of Jaroslav Hašek and Egon Erwin Kisch and in 1916 married Erna Hauswald in Dresden where he occupied a studio at Sedanstraße 7.

In 1919, he started using a 9x12 camera and, by 1924, adopted the Leica. In 1925, he exhibited at Film und Foto in Stuttgart.

Fiedler adopted a face image as his emblem and claimed expertise in photographing picturesque women.

His studio was bombed in 1945. He stored exhibition photos with family in Moravia. Post-1945, he authored photography books in East Germany. Anneliese Kretschmer was one of his students in Dortmund.

== Publications ==
- 'Dresden in Bildern', Aufnahmen von Franz Fiedler, herausgegeben von Hans Wolfgang Singer, Wien, Leipzig, Verlag Dr. Hans Epstein, 1930 ('Orbis urbium – Schöne Städte in schönen Bildern').
- Dufek, Antonín, Franz Fiedler, Fotografie/Photographs/Fotografien (Brno, Prague, 2005)
- Franz Fiedler. Fotografie. Technische Sammlungen der Stadt Dresden, Ausstellung 4.4.-3.6.2007
