= History of the Jews in Prostějov =

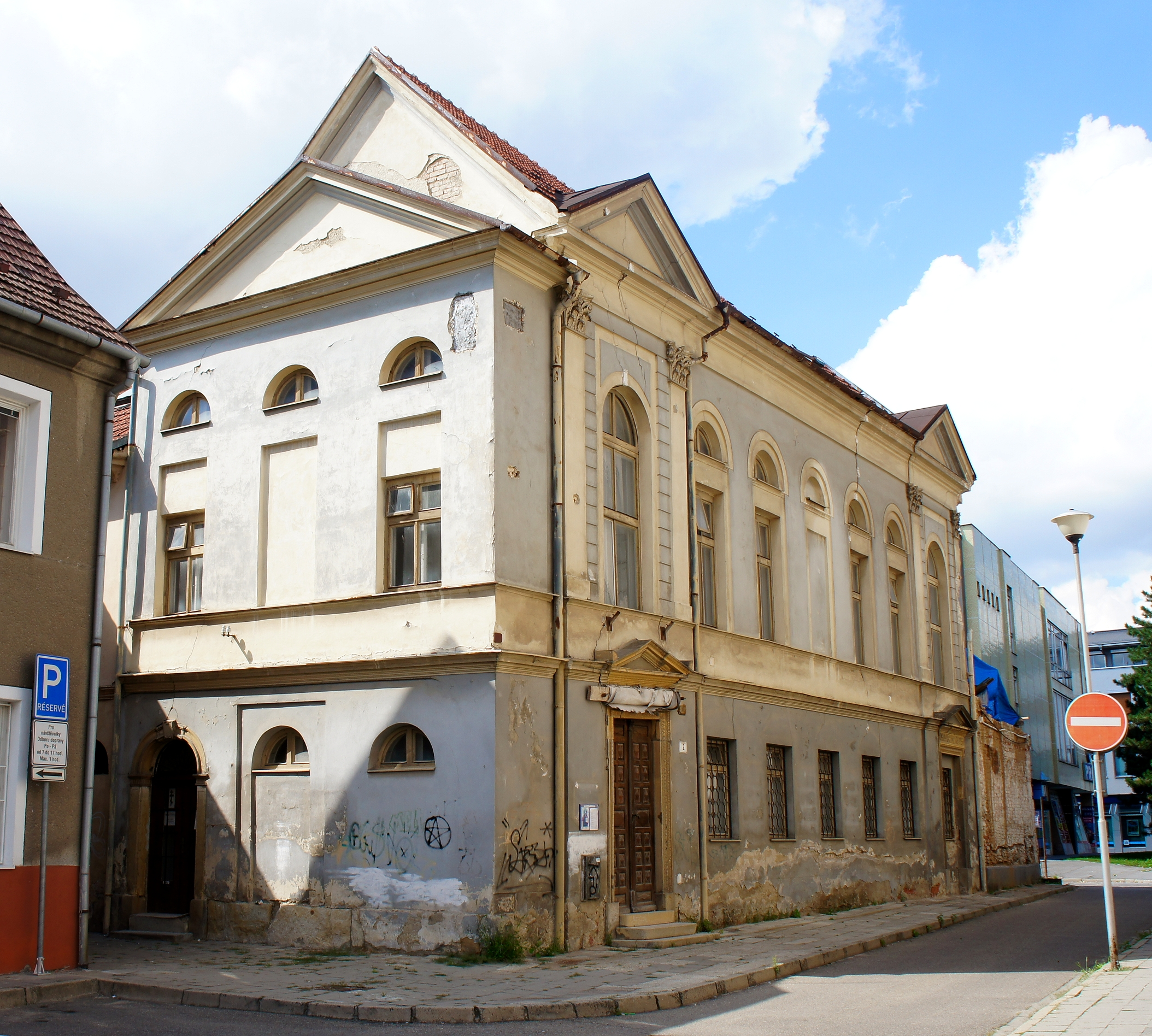
Stará Synagogue in Prostějov, photo by Ondřej Žváček

The Jewish community in Prostějov was one of the biggest Jewish communities in the Moravian region called the "Jerusalem of Hana".The Jewish quarter remained until 1990 when they demolished the buildings. There are two former synagogues: New Synagogue (now Hus Congregational House) and Synagogue Beit Ha-Midrash (owned by Orthodox Church). Rabbi Meir Eisenstadt, Judah Leib Prossnitz, Rabbi Jonathan Eybeschutz, Rabbi Nathan Porges, Rabbi Moses Sofer, orientalist Moritz Steinschneider and famous philosopher Edmund Husserl lived here.

Starting in the Middle Ages, Prostějov had important textile and ready-made clothing industries, in which Jews had a central role, although they sometimes clashed with Christian guilds. The first documents that mention Jews in the city date back to 1445. The Jewish community in the city was largely founded by Jews who were forced to leave nearby Olomouc in 1454. In 1584, Jews gained official right to residence but were still restricted in what professions they could go into. At that time, the community was made up of 31 families.

The Jewish community gained more importance following the migration of Protestants from the city after pressure from local Catholics. In 1639, 143 Jewish men were recorded living in the city and 64 houses there were owned by Jews. The Jewish population grew significantly as a result of people fleeing the Khmelnytsky massacres in 1648 and the Jewish expulsion from Vienna in 1670. A compromise reached in 1677 and amended in 1688 about the extent of trade between Jews and non-Jews is evidence of the key role of Jews in the textile and clothing trades. In 1713, there were 318 Jewish families in the city.

The Shabbatean movement and Frankism were influential in the city, and one of the leaders of the Shabbatean movement, Judah Leib Prossnitz, lived there. The community was also one of the earliest to be affect by the ideas of the Haskalah. When Feith Ehrenstamm founded a factory in 1831, it marked the beginning of Jewish enterprise in the modern textile industry, and in 1842 there were 135 Jewish textile merchants in the city. In 1859, Mayer and Isaac Mandel founded the first ready-made clothing factory on the European continent. By 1880, there were 1,804 Jews living in the city.

A number of World War I refugees settled in the city, and helped make the Jewish community one of the most active in the country. The Jewish community was severely impacted by the German invasion in 1939, and endured Gestapo raids and the closure of the synagogue in July of that year. In 1940, much of the Jewish community fled. The remaining Jews were sent by the Nazis to extermination camps in 1942. About 1,390 Jews from Prostějov were killed in the Holocaust.
