= Jenista =

Jenista is a given name and a surname. As a Czech surname Jeništa (feminine: Jeništová), it is derived from the nickname derived from the given name Jan. Notable people with the name include:

- Greyson Jenista (born 1996), American baseball player
- Jana Jeništová-Fiedlerová (1888–1966), one of the first Czech artistic female photographers
- Jenista Elaine Clark (born 1988), commonly known as Jennie Clark, American professional soccer defender
- Jenista Mhagama (1967–2025), Tanzanian politician
- Květa Eretová (1926–2021), née Jeništová, Czech chess player
- Luděk Jeništa (born 1961), Czech politician, MP
