= Beth ha-midrash synagogue =

Former synagogue in the Czech Republic

- Hebrew: בית המדרש, Czech: synagoga Bet ha-midraš
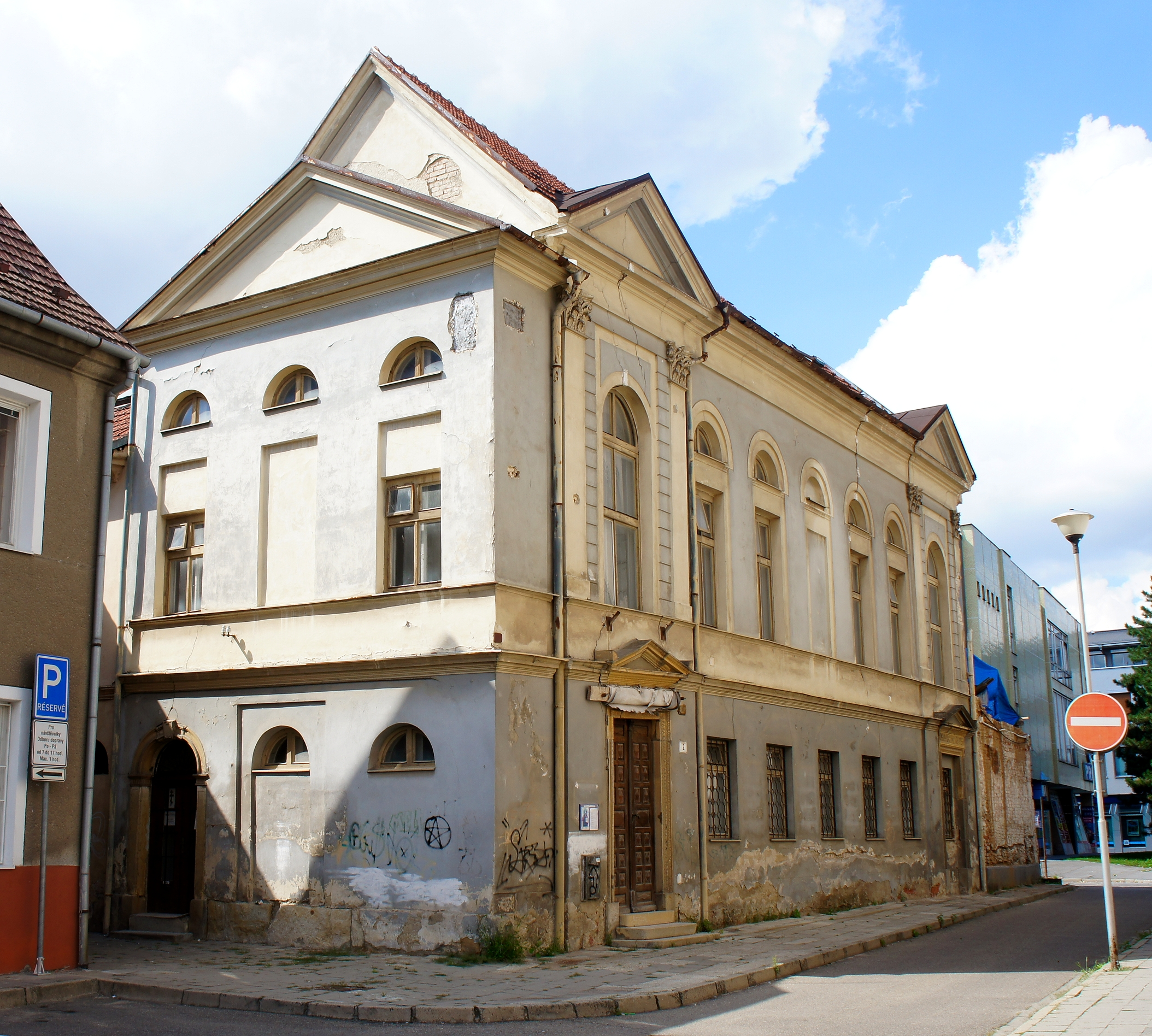
- The former synagogue in 2012

- Location of the former synagogue in the Czech Republic

Religion
- Affiliation: Judaism (former)
- Ecclesiastical or organisational status: Synagogue (1836–1939); Church (1951–1963); Gallery (1969–1989); Church (2004–2018)
- Status: Closed (as a synagogue); Repurposed

Location
- Location: Prostějov, Olomouc Region
- Country: Czech Republic
- Coordinates: 49°28′19″N 17°06′49″E

Architecture
- Completed: 1836

National Cultural Monument of the Czech Republic
- Official name: Synagoga Beth´ha - Midrasch
- Type: Object
- Designated: 12 November 1998
- Reference no.: 1000162859

The Beth ha-midrash synagogue (Hebrew: בית המדרש, Czech: synagoga Bet ha-midraš) is a former Jewish synagogue and bet midrash, located in Prostějov, in the Olomouc Region of the Czech Republic.

== History ==
The synagogue was built in 1836 and was used by Jewish community in Prostějov to 1939. In 1951–1963 and 2004–2018, the building was used by the Orthodox Christian community. In some of the intervening years, the building was used as an art gallery.

The building was listed as a cultural monument of the Czech Republic in 1998.

The building was transferred to private ownership. In March 2024 it was reported that the former synagogue was for sale for approximately € 217,000.

== See also ==
- History of the Jews in the Czech Republic
