= National House, Prostějov =

Coordinates: 49°28′25″N 17°6′53″E

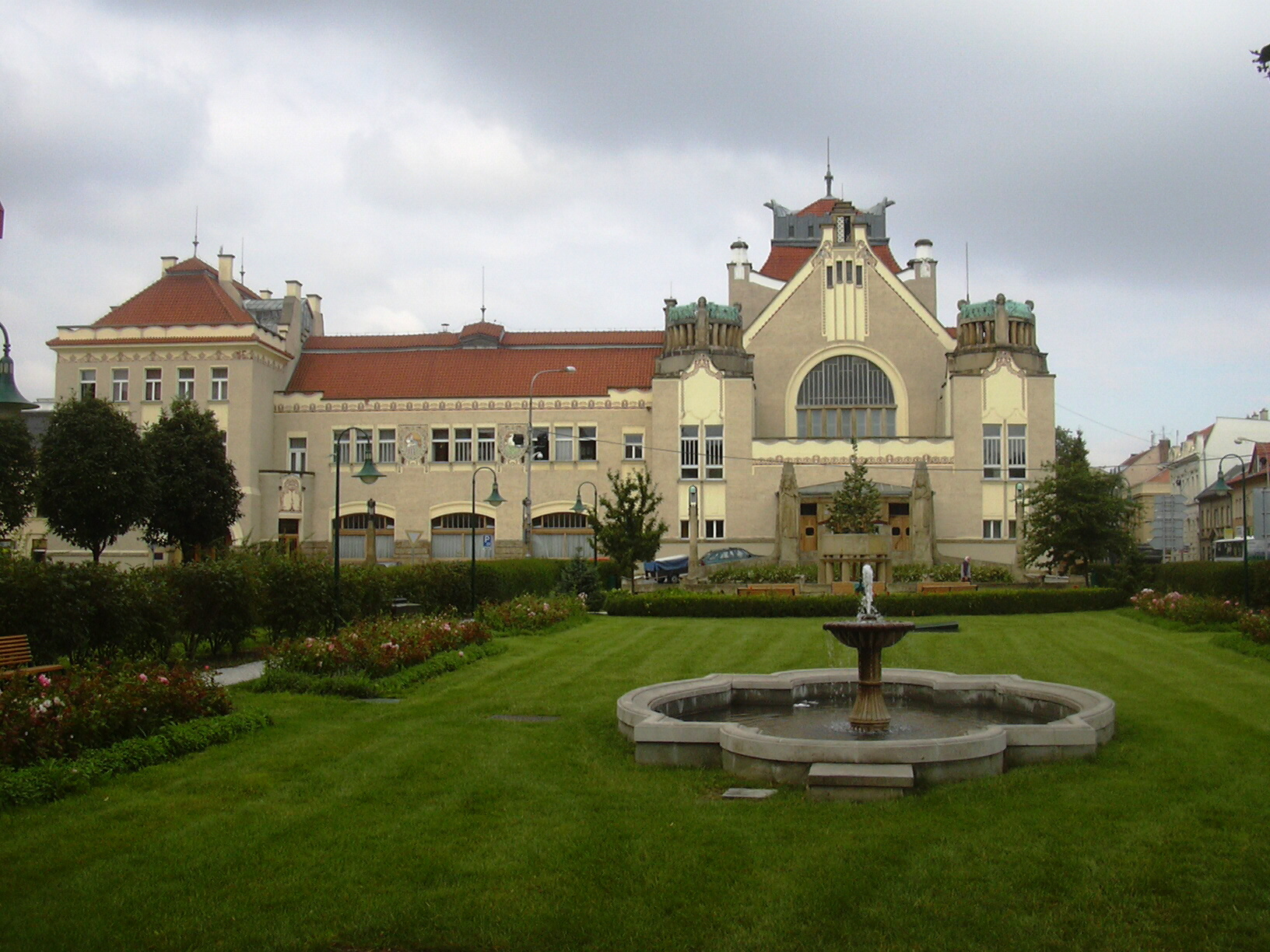
View from the east

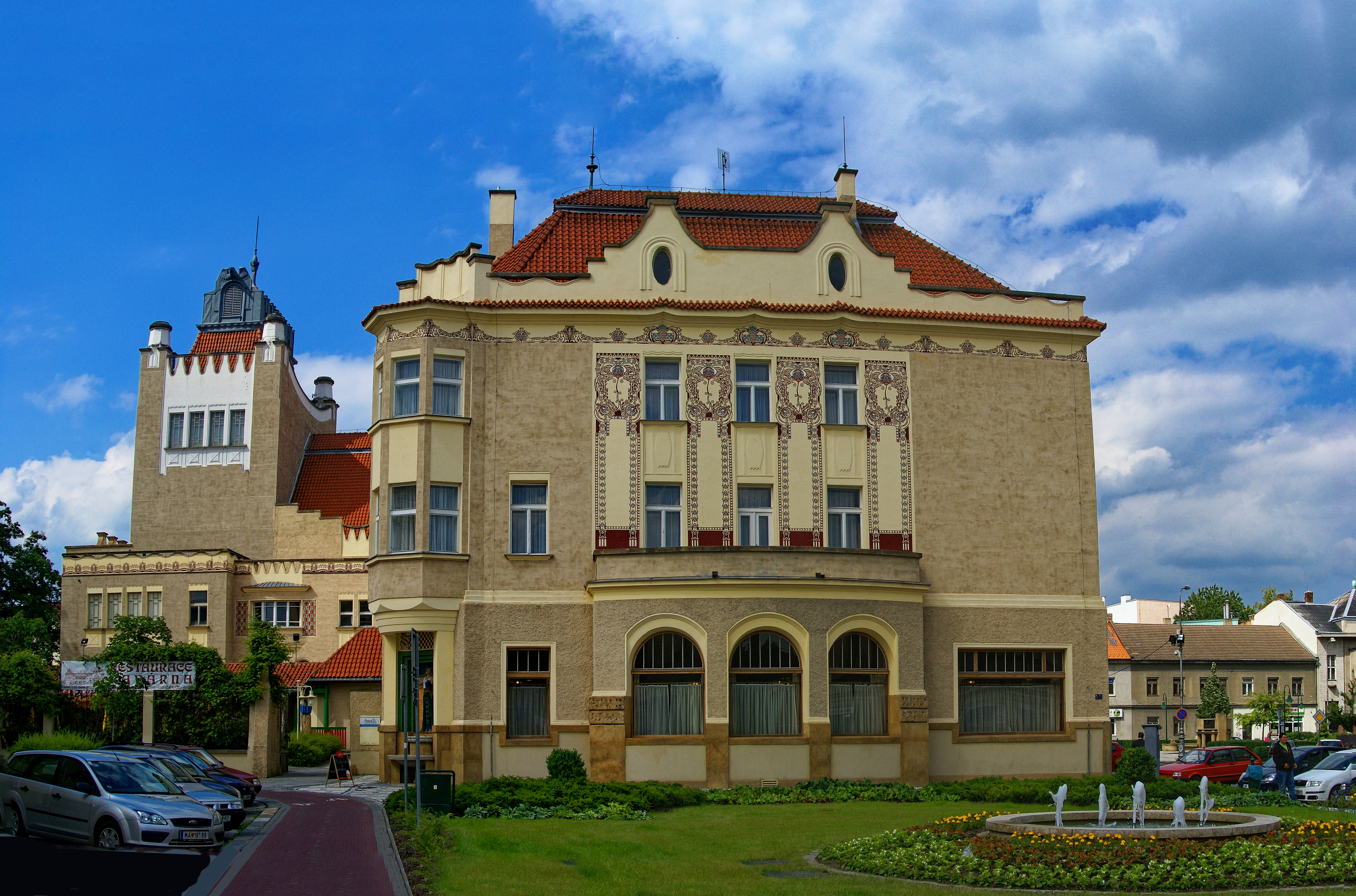
View from the north

The National House (Czech: Národní dům) is a historical building in Prostějov in the Czech Republic. It was built for cultural and social purposes. It is a significant cultural monument of the city.

== History ==
The National House was designed by the Czech architect Jan Kotěra. It was built in Art Nouveau style in 1905–1907.

Many famous artists collaborated on designing the building, such as painters František Kysela and Jan Preisler, and sculptors Stanislav Sucharda, Vojtěch Sucharda and Karel Petr.

Since 2008, it has been protected as a national cultural monument.
