= Museum of Eastern Bohemia =

Museum in Hradec Králové, Czech Republic

- Muzeum východních Čech

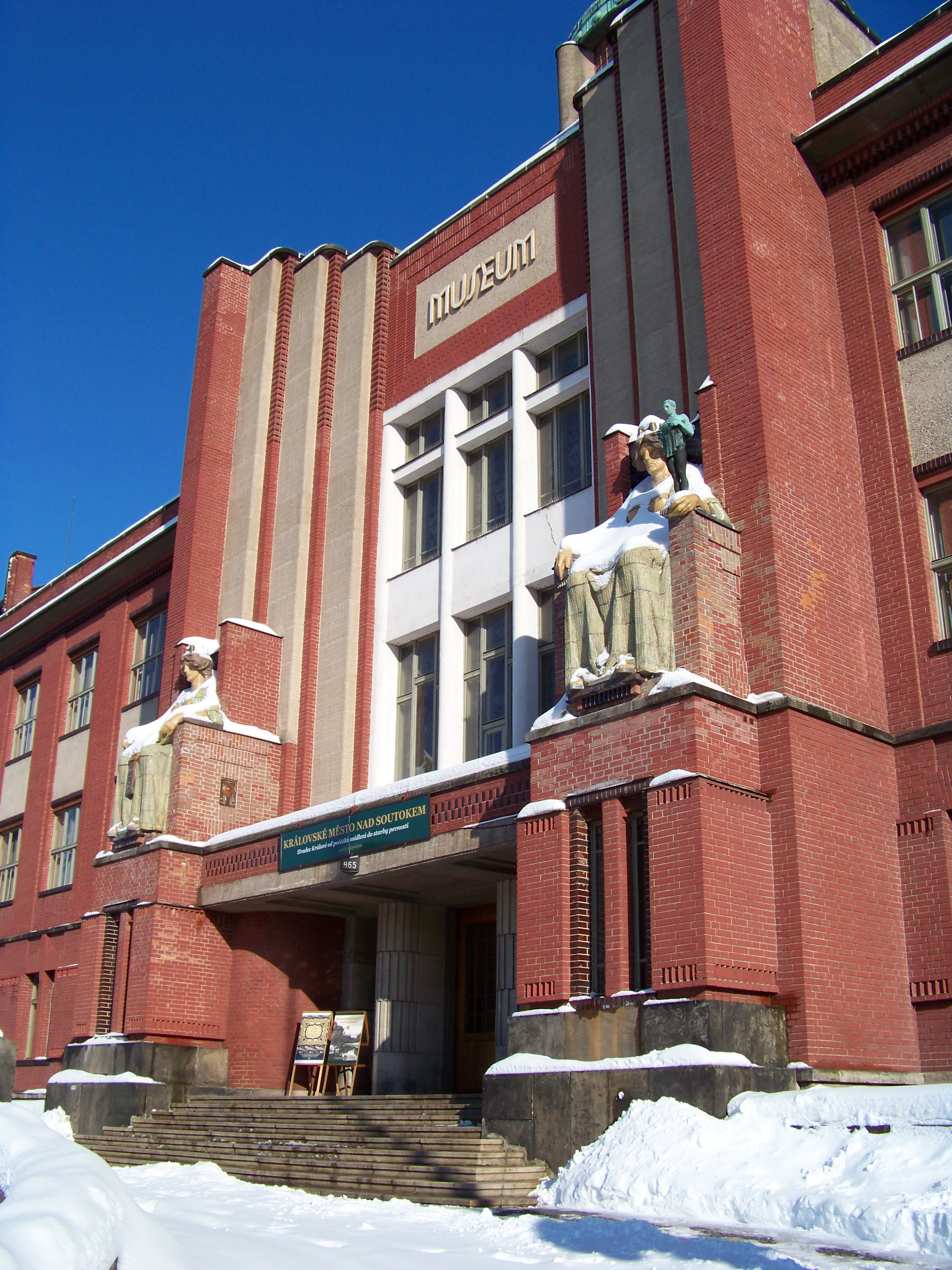
- Grand entrance to the museum
- Established: 1912
- Location: Eliščino nábřeží 465, Hradec Králové, Czech Republic, 500 03
- Coordinates: 50.211735°N 15.828992°E
- Website: www.muzeumhk.cz

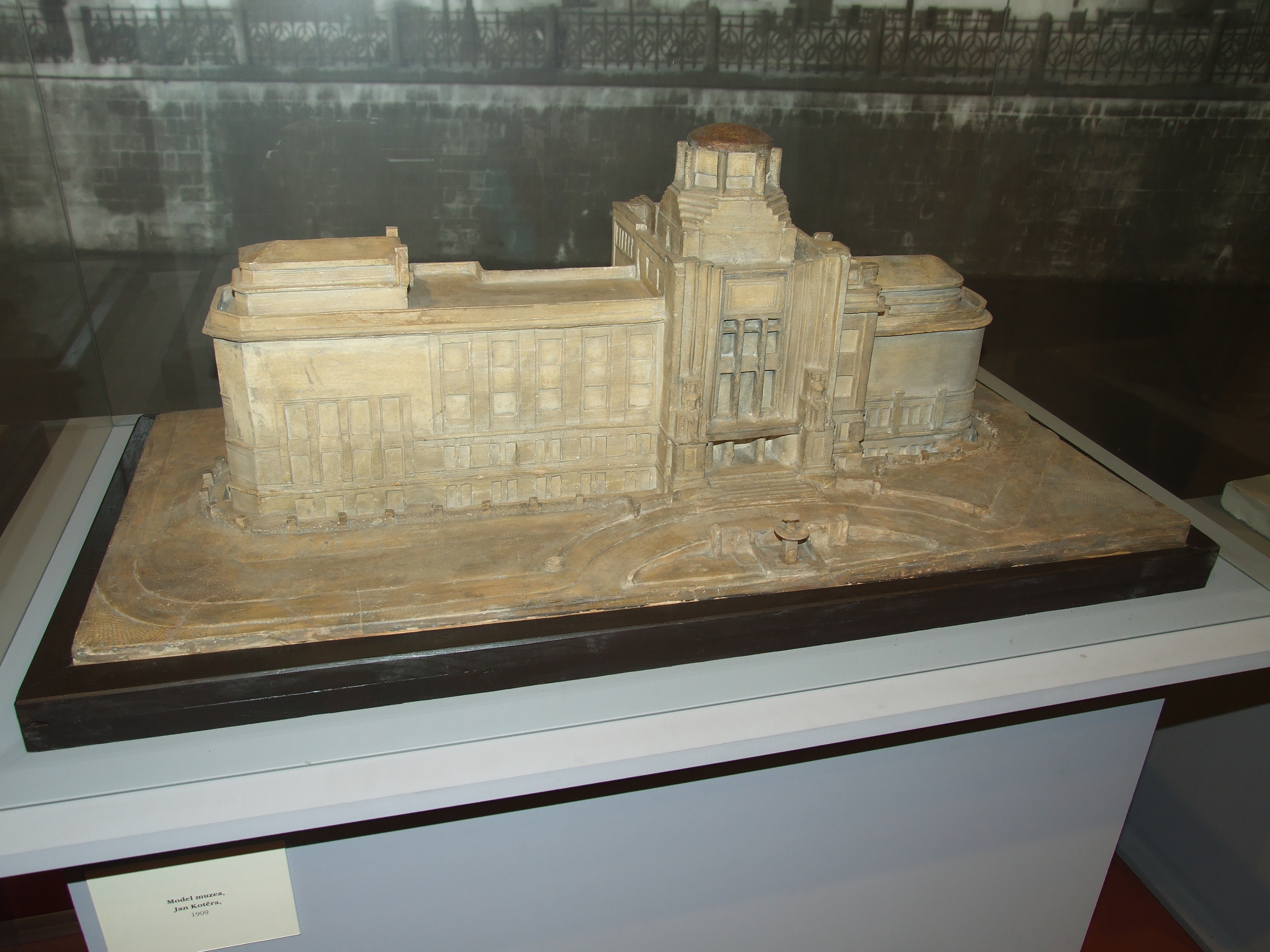
Model of the museum, clearly showing its asymmetry

The Museum of Eastern Bohemia (Czech: Muzeum východních Čech) is a museum and historic landmark in Hradec Králové, Czech Republic. It was designed by Jan Kotěra, a prominent Czech architect of the early 20th century.

The East Bohemian Museum was built in 1909–1912. Kotěra's initial design, presented in 1907, was criticized for its exaggerated decoration and luxurious design. Moreover, the city did not have sufficient funds for such a grandiose design. Consequently, Kotěra created a new design that was finished in 1908.

== Architecture ==
The museum is modeled on a classic temple. "…The groundplan [is] in the form of a Latin cross, [with a] polygonal nave, a dome above the intersection, [and] a monumental side entrance…" Regarding decoration, the entrance is decorated by two sculptures next to the entrance door. These female figures are said to be an allegory of History and Industry. These two are accompanied by a third figure made from bronze. This one is supposed to be a young František Ulrich, who became mayor of Hradec Králové at the age of 36. Although he was young, people hoped that he would lead the city to progress.

Kotěra also designed the interior of the museum. Visitors can see furniture in the director's office, a library, seats made by Thonet Company and wood linings in the lecture hall, lighting and a fountain in front of the main entrance to the museum. The museum interiors are designed in the functionalist style.

The building of the Museum of Eastern Bohemia was awaited with mixed feeling of the whole public. Kotěra was known as a young and progressive architect, and he confirmed this statement in his works. The asymmetrical design of the building was rejected by Kotěra's teacher, Otto Wagner, but Kotěra prevailed.

In 1995 the building was declared a national cultural monument. It was extensively reconstructed in 1999–2002.
