= Annelise Kretschmer =

German portrait photographer (1903–1987)

Annelise Kretschmer (1903 – 1987) was a German portrait photographer.

Kretschmer is best known for her depictions of women in Germany in the early 20th century and is credited with helping construct the 'Neue Frau' or New Woman image of modern femininity.

== Biography ==
Kretschmer was born in Dortmund, Germany. Her parents owned a clothing store in the region. Her father was born into a Jewish family, but was a practicing Protestant. He ran an antiques shop. Kretschmer grew up in what she called "an unconventional merchant family". Her sister Margot was born in 1905, but died as a young woman Kretschmer's brother, Wilhelm, was two years her senior.

After Kretschmer left high school in 1919, her parents transferred her to the 'daughter training institute' of Dr.Weiss in Weimar. In 1922, she returned to Dortmund, her only ambition to have a family. At the advice of the Traub family, Kretschmer moved to Munich to attend the School of Decorative Arts and live with them. At the school she studied drawing and bookbinding for two years, but was not enthused with it.

== Early career ==
Dissatisfied with her career direction, Kretschmer followed a friend's suggestion to volunteer at photography studios to volunteer . She moved to Essen to work in the portrait studio of E. von Kaenel (1922-1924). As von Kaenel was frequently absent, Kretschmer soon took over the daily tasks of the studio. She found enjoyment in photographing her family as well a shooting clothing photographs for the family business. She was very little interested in fashion though, the photos were a favor. In the photos, "fashion was secondary" to Kretschmer, "they were portraits shot in which [she] could play with fabrics and accessories".

In 1924, Kretschmer became a master disciple of Franz Fiedler in Dresden. It was here that she learned the specifics of his bromoil printing techniques. While working for Fiedler Kretschmer could not work on her own projects, but it was in his studio that she first attempted "to portray man as he behaves". She developed her unique sensibility for portraiture here, evolving from her curiosities and interests in other people. At the suggestion of Fiedler, Kretschmer became a member of the Society of German Photographers in 1926 and participated in a few group exhibitions.

=== Marriage and family ===
In 1928, Kretschmer married the sculptor Sigmund Kretschmer who she met in Dresden. Her husband's influence sparked her interest in contemporary art. During this period, Sigmund would watch the children while Kretschmer worked. After the family moved back to Dortmund, Kretschmer opened her first photography studio with support from her parents.

== Exhibitions ==
Kretschmer exhibited in the landmark national exhibition of Film und Foto, 1929. Most likely through her position as a member of the Society of German Photographers who were exhibited along with German Amateur photographer Association and the Social Democratic Party of Germany. The exhibition housed over one thousand photographs and 13 exhibition rooms. The exhibition today is considered of monumental importance to modernism, as associate professor of humanities & fine arts, Vanessa Rocco states, "Even in its own time, the exhibition was being historicized." She also cites the critic Franz Roh who stated in his trilingual 1929 book Foto-Auge/Oeil photo/Oeil en photo/Photo-Eye, that the exhibition was one of the "most important event in the visual field on the last few years." Perhaps because of the exhibitions international sensibilities, with an international selection committee consisting of established artists of multiple backgrounds; from Germany were Moholy-Nagy and Jan Tschichold, El Lissitzky from the Soviet Union and Edward Steichen and Edward Weston from the United States, and Piet Zwart from Holland. The display of much of the photography rooms was through a "structuring logic of the printed page [which] placed a profusion of pictures directly before the visitor in pedagogical pairings or groupings, most of which sought to redefine the medium's aesthetic merit."

In 1929 Kretschmer participated in the traveling exhibition "Film und Foto", and in 1930 the extension exhibition "Das Lichtbild". The exhibition ran from 18 May–July 7, 1920. The exhibitions started in Stuttgart and travelled to Zurich, Berlin, Danzig, Vienna, Agram, and Munich. The Munich version of Film and Foto was "Das Lichtbild" which would go on a singular regional tour throughout Essen, Dessau, and Breslau.

== New photography ==
There was a large influx of photography exhibition post-World War I, perhaps because of broader accessibility to the camera, but these exhibitions also functioned as "vehicles for establishing a dominant mode within modernist photography, culminating in a spate of such exhibitions in the late 1920s." This new direction being formulated would come to be known as the 'New Vision' as Vanessa Rocco states, this New Vision "advocated the potential of the camera to create a new way of looking at the fast-moving, modern, urban world through the use of dynamic camera angles [and] inventive framing of subjects..."

As Kretschmer states her artistic goals in this emerging medium were that "with a good photo, the idea is elevated to reality and reality elevated to the idea." And in her work she utilized modes of cropping and unconventional angles, while still insisting upon the "personality of the subject."

== World War II ==
Kretschmer died in 1934. leaving the business to his wife. In 1938, she abandoned the family business.

Due to her Jewish heritage, Kretschmer and her family considered fleeing Nazi Germany, but with three small children and an established business, the task was not so simple. They ultimately family remained in Dortmund, living in fear of persecution.

During World War II, Kretschmer's studio work consisted of passport prints for the soldiers. After heavy bombing raids in Dortmund on 12 March 1945, the family fled the city.

== Post-war career ==
In 1950 Kretschmer and her family returned to Dortmund and she reopened her studio. Three years later Sigmund Kretschmer died (1953), from this point on she managed her studio work with her youngest daughter Christiane von Konigslow. Christiane von Königslöw worked with her mother in her photography studio for two decades. After the war, the passport clientele came from many kinds of people, and the familial portrait shots were usually commissioned by circles within business or industry.

Kretschmer ran her portrait studio for a total of fifty years, and she photographed some of the same families through multiple generations. She felt that "The success of a portrait ultimately lies with the photographer." Her work after the 1950s consisted of mainly artists, for example, sculptor Ewald Mataré and photographer Albert Renger-Patzsch were both photographed by Kretschmer.
