= Trmal Villa =

Villa in Prague designed in 1902 by the Czech architect Jan Kotěra

- Trmalova vila
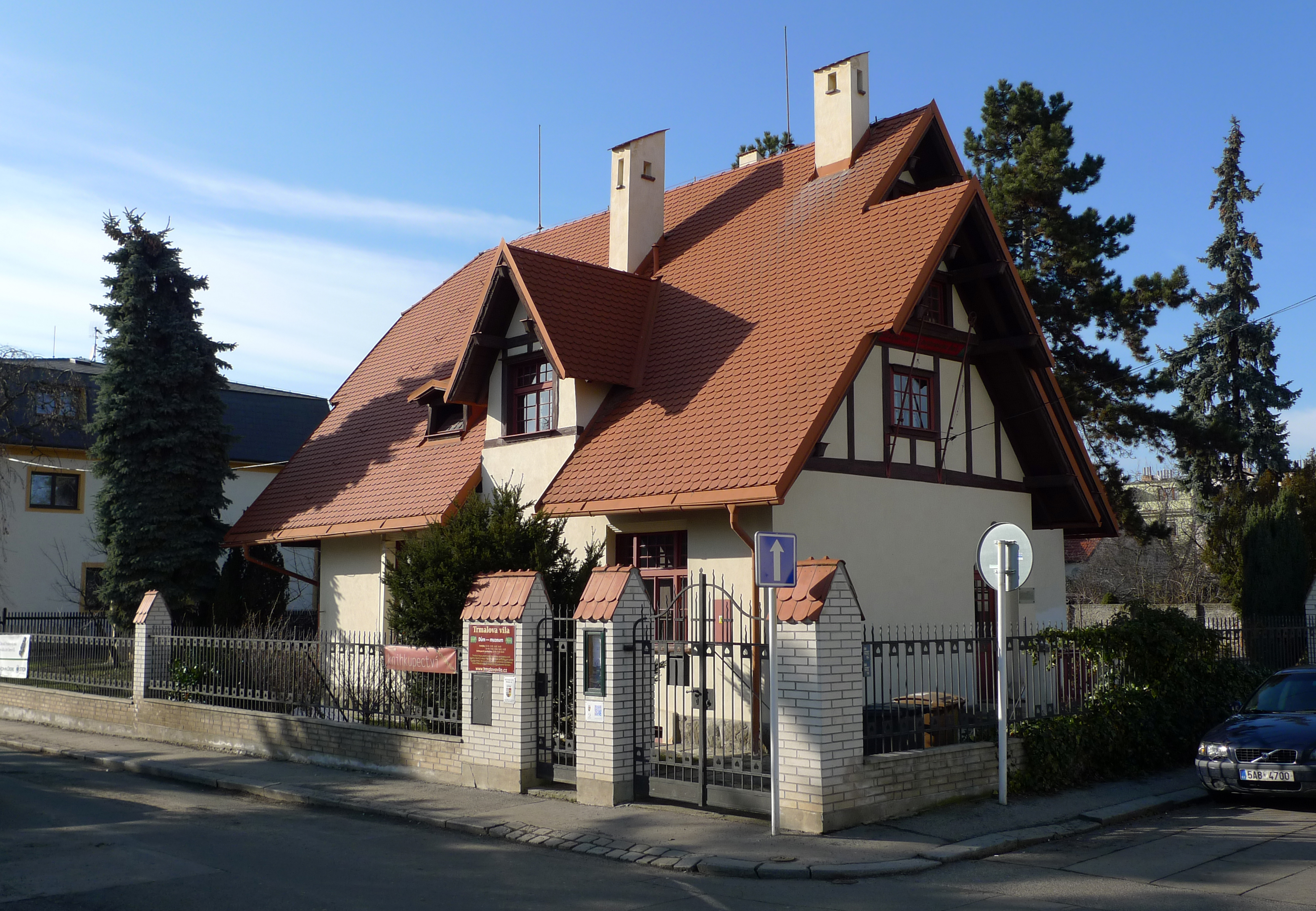
- Trmal Villa in Strašnice
- Interactive map of the Trmal Villa area

General information
- Status: Museum
- Architectural style: English modernism
- Location: Vilová 91/11, Prague 10 - Strašnice, Prague 10, Czech Republic
- Coordinates: 50.0738°N 14.488°E
- Construction started: 1902
- Completed: 1903
- Owner: Prague 10

Design and construction
- Architect: Jan Kotěra

Trmal Villa (Czech: Trmalova vila) is a villa in Prague designed in 1902 by the Czech architect Jan Kotěra in the English Modernist style. The villa has been restored, and is now a museum and cultural centre open to the public and for research. Its architect has been described as the "founder of modern Czech architecture".

== History ==
Jan Kotěra designed this villa for František Trmal, a leading teacher and inspector of schools, for whom it is still named. Construction began in 1902 and was completed the following year. The building stands on the corner of Vilová and U Nových vil. It was one of Kotera's early designs, and is therefore important since Kotera is regarded as a leading Czech architect and "the founder of modern Czech architecture". In 1911 the original owner sold the villa to Tereza and František Walek, who installed a winter garden and a terrace. The building was subsequently the property of Marta Wálková from 1925 until the end of the Second World War.

In 1945 the villa was recognised to be of national importance, and the State was given ownership in 1950. After this date it was painted red and used as a music school, which accounts for the loss of the original furniture. The villa was badly maintained after the Velvet Revolution until it became the responsibility of the City of Prague. In 2001 a three-year programme of repair was completed, and it was reopened to the public. Today it functions as a centre for architects studying Jan Kotera's legacy, and as a museum. The displays inside explain the architecture of similar buildings and other related themes.

== Description ==
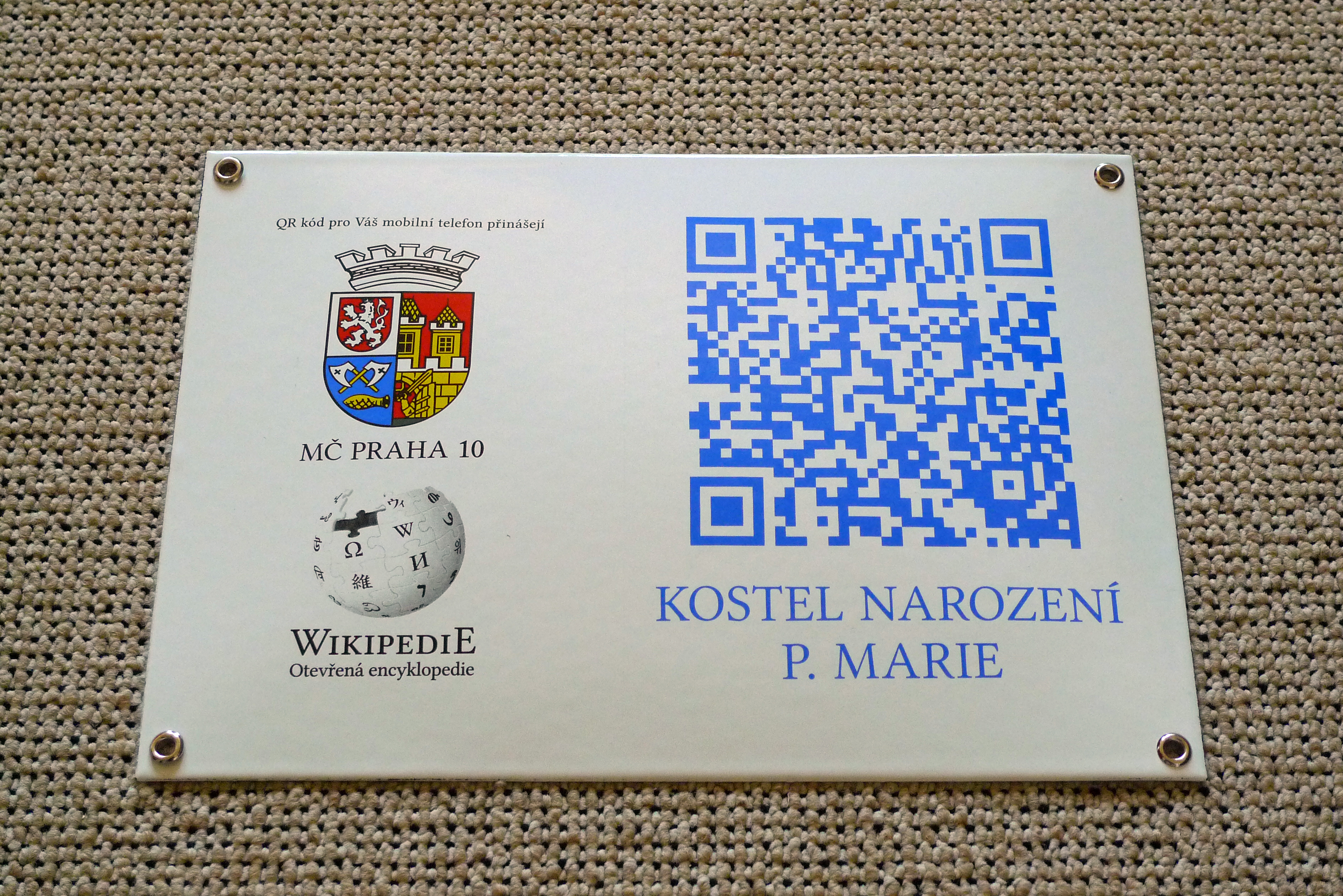
A QRpedia code gives access to this article.

Although the house has some Czech folk design aspects, its dormer windows, tall chimneys, gable ends with exposed beams and its complex tiled roof establish it as a design based on modern English traditions. The house also has Czech aspects, and ideas from the Arts and Crafts Movement due to the influence of Charles Voysey on Jan Kotěra's ideas. A key point of the design is the craft-built staircase which is decorated with floral-inspired geometric designs on the stairs and the painted beamed ceiling. The staircase gives access to a dining room and living room on the ground floor, and bedrooms and a children's room on the first floor.

The house is still set in the gardens Kotěra designed, although today it is surrounded by houses built after the Second World War. The house was not intended to be surrounded by other buildings, and was designed to allow the owner to keep farm animals in an outside shed. Today the garden still has Kotera's winding pathways leading to open porches, but the original picket fence is no longer there. Originally the house had three entrances.

As part of the European Heritage Days initiative this building was opened to the public in September 2012. In addition the council of Prague 10 and Wikimedia Czech Republic installed a QRpedia code to allow access to this article.
