= Judah Leib Prossnitz =

Jewish kabbalist and messiah claimant

Judah Leib (Leibele) (Löbele) Prossnitz (c. 1670 – c. 1730/1750) was a kabbalist born about the end of the seventeenth century at Uherský Brod, Moravia. He left his native city and went to Prostějov (German: Prossnitz), Moravia, where he married, earning a livelihood by peddling in the neighboring villages. On account of his poverty, he occupied a deserted hovel, which was reputed to be haunted.

One night he promised to summon the Shekhina to appear at midnight at a large gathering. Prossnitz stretched across his room a perforated curtain, behind which he had secretly lighted a mixture of alcohol and turpentine. Robed in white, he stood behind the curtain, and the light brought out in full relief the gilt letters of the Tetragrammaton, which he had placed on his breast. The spectators were disposed to believe in a miracle, when someone present (Jacob Emden believes it to be the rabbi), pulled down the curtain and exposed the fraud. Prossnitz was excommunicated by the rabbis of Moravia, among them the "Landrabbiner" David Oppenheim.

In spite of all, Prossnitz found many followers among the Sabbateans. He proclaimed himself the Messiah ben Joseph, and signed his name "Joseph ben Jacob." He had relations with the Sabbatean Mordecai Eisenstadt and with Jonathan Eybeschütz, and seems to have been especially influenced by the Sabbatean Nehemiah Hayyun. Prossnitz wandered from city to city in Austria and Germany, where many persons supplied him with funds. In 1725 the excommunication was renewed, whereupon he moved to Hungary. Emden relates that he died there among non-Jews.

Prossnitz taught that, since the appearance of Shabbatai Zevi, God had entrusted the guidance of the world to him, after whose ascent to heaven the mission passed to Jonathan Eybeschütz and, finally, to Prossnitz himself.

== Jewish Encyclopedia bibliography ==
- Grätz, Gesch. x. 349, 364 et seq., 387;
- Jacob Emden, Torat ha-kena'ot, pp. 71, 72, Lemberg, 1870;
- Kohn (Kahana), Eben ha-To'im, Vienna, 1873;
- Moses Hagiz, Lehishat Saraf (reprinted in Emden, Torat ha-kena'ot), pp. 81, 85.
