= Nathan Porges =

Austrian-German rabbi (1848–1924)

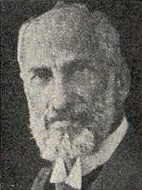
Nathan Porges (1848-1924)

Nathan Porges (21 December 1848 – 27 August 1924) was a Bohemia and German rabbi.

== Biography ==
Porges was born in Prostějov in Moravia, then part of the Austrian Empire.

He was educated in his native town Prostějov, at the gymnasium of Olomouc, and at the University of Olomouc (Ph.D. 1869) and the Jewish Theological Seminary (rabbi 1869) of Breslau (Wrocław). He became successively rabbi at Nakel (Nakło nad Notecią) (1875), Mannheim (1879), Pilsen (1880), Karlovy Vary (1882), and Leipzig; he began officiating in the last city in 1888.

Porges died in Würzburg.

== Literary works ==
Porges wrote many articles, essays, and critiques for periodicals including:

- Revue des Études Juives
- Monatsschrift für Geschichte und Wissenschaft des Judenthums
- Zeitschrift für Hebräische Bibliographie
- Centralblatt für Bibliothekswesen

He was the author of:

- Über die Verbalstammbildung in den Semitischen Sprachen, Vienna, 1875
- Bibelkunde und Babelfunde, Leipzig, 1903
