= Prostějov =

City in Olomouc Region, Czech Republic

- Statutory city
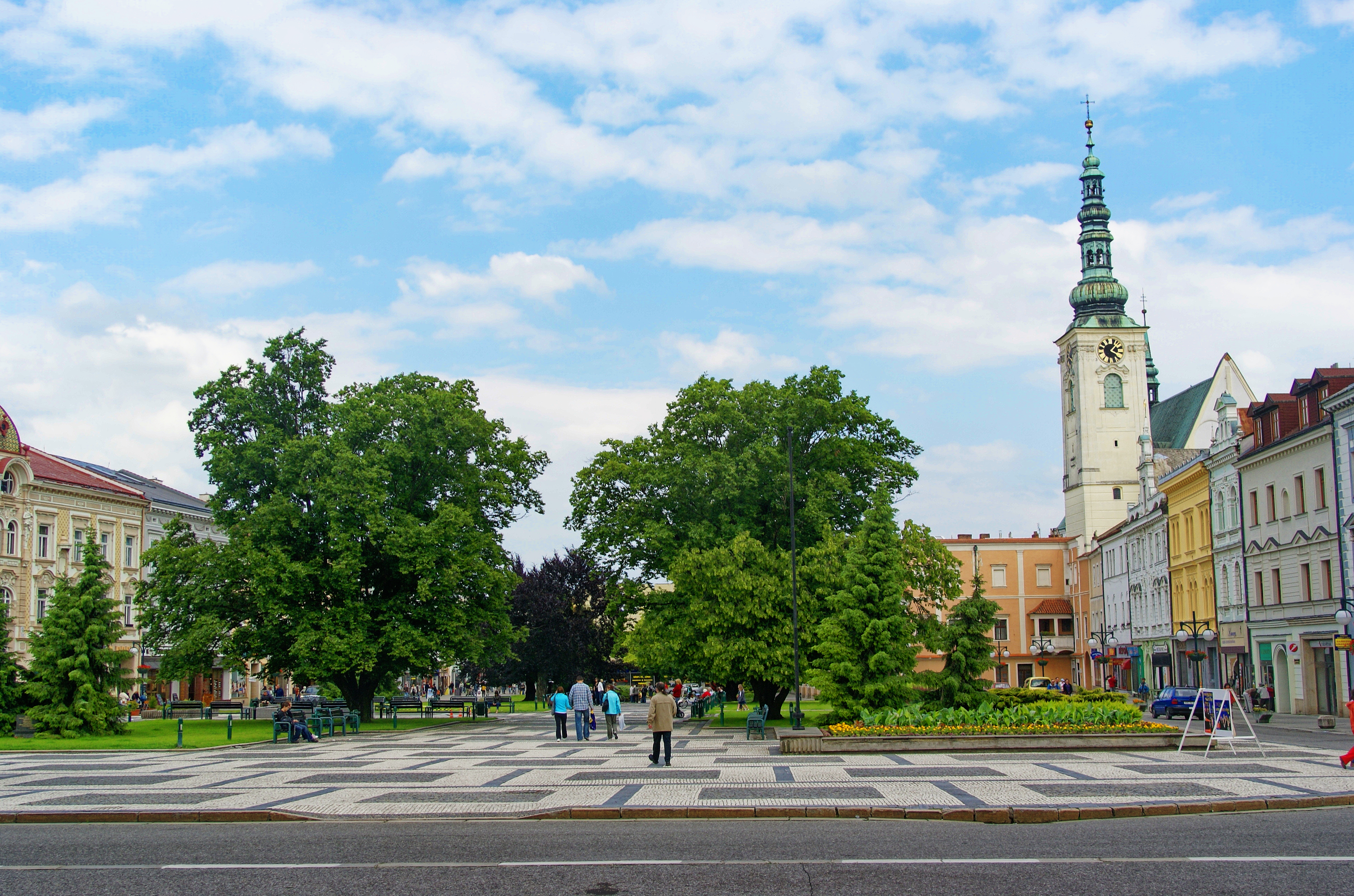
- The square Náměstí T. G. Masaryka

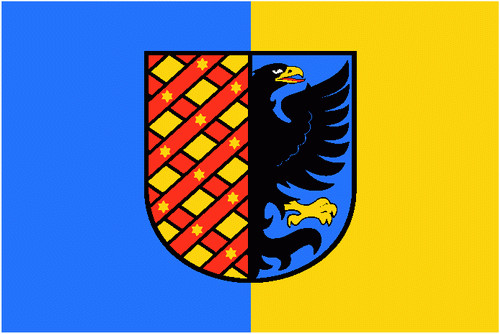
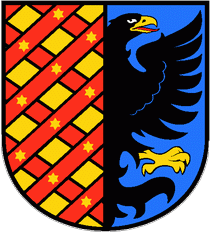
- Flag Coat of arms

- Location in the Czech Republic
- Coordinates: 49°28′20″N 17°6′38″E
- Country: Czech Republic
- Region: Olomouc
- District: Prostějov
- First mentioned: 1141

Government
  - Mayor: Jana Jílková (Na rovinu!)

Area
  - Total: 39.04 km^{2} (15.07 sq mi)
- Elevation: 223 m (732 ft)

Population (2026-01-01)
  - Total: 43,236
  - Density: 1,107/km^{2} (2,868/sq mi)
- Time zone: UTC+1 (CET)
  - Summer (DST): UTC+2 (CEST)
- Postal code: 796 01
- Website: www.prostejov.eu

Prostějov (Czech pronunciation: [ˈproscɛjof]; German: Proßnitz) is a city in the Olomouc Region of the Czech Republic. It has about 43,000 inhabitants. It is located on the Romže River in the Upper Morava Valley. The city is historically known for its fashion industry. TK Agrofert Prostějov is among the most successful Czech tennis clubs.

The most important noble owners of Prostějov were the families of Pernštejn (1495–1599) and Liechtenstein (1599–1848). The historic city centre is well preserved and is protected as an urban monument zone. Among the most important monuments in Prostějov are the National House, protected as a national cultural monument, the Church of the Exaltation of the Holy Cross, which is the oldest building in the city, and the Prostějov Castle.

== Administrative division ==
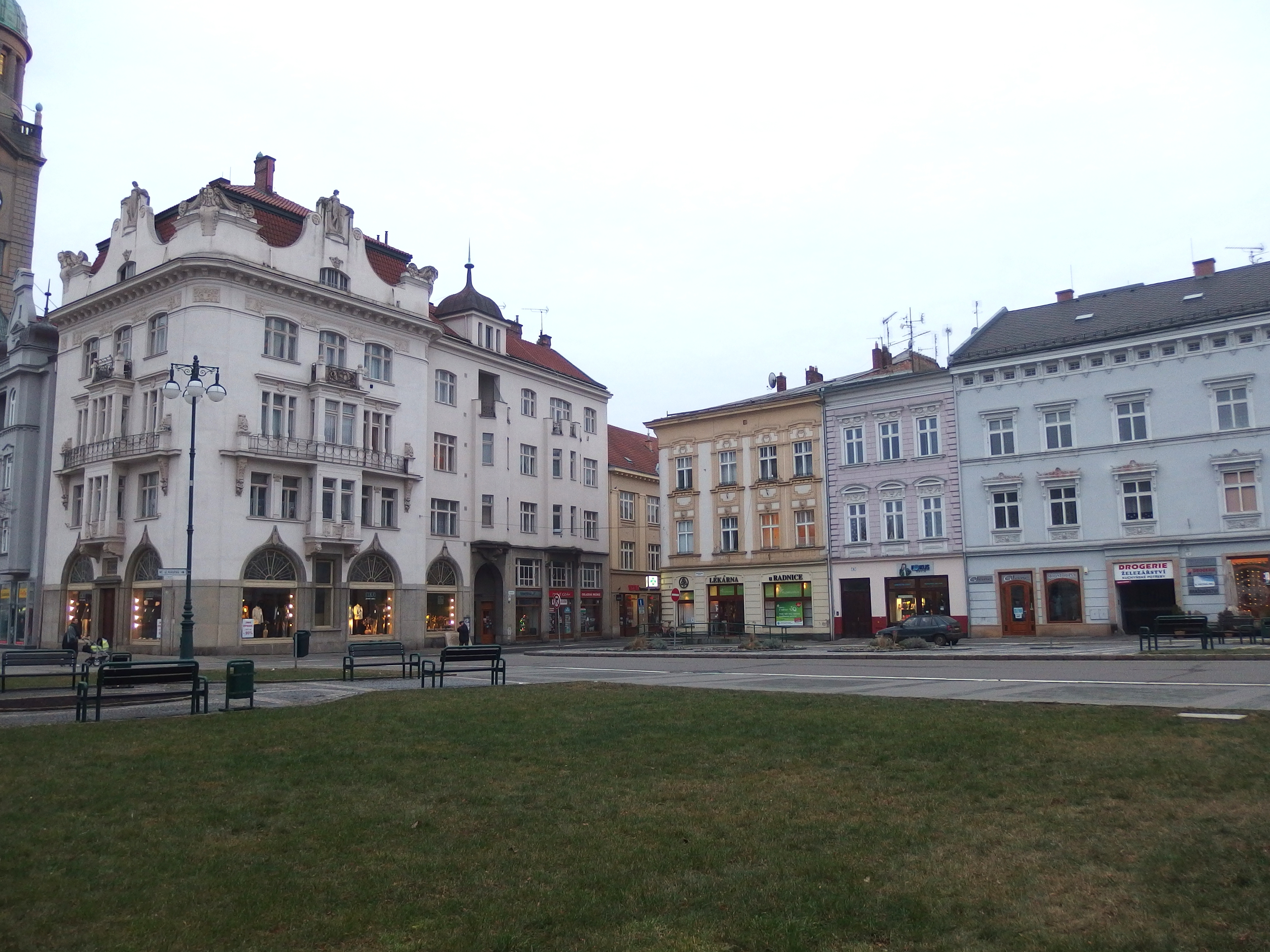
Pernštýnské náměstí in the historical centre

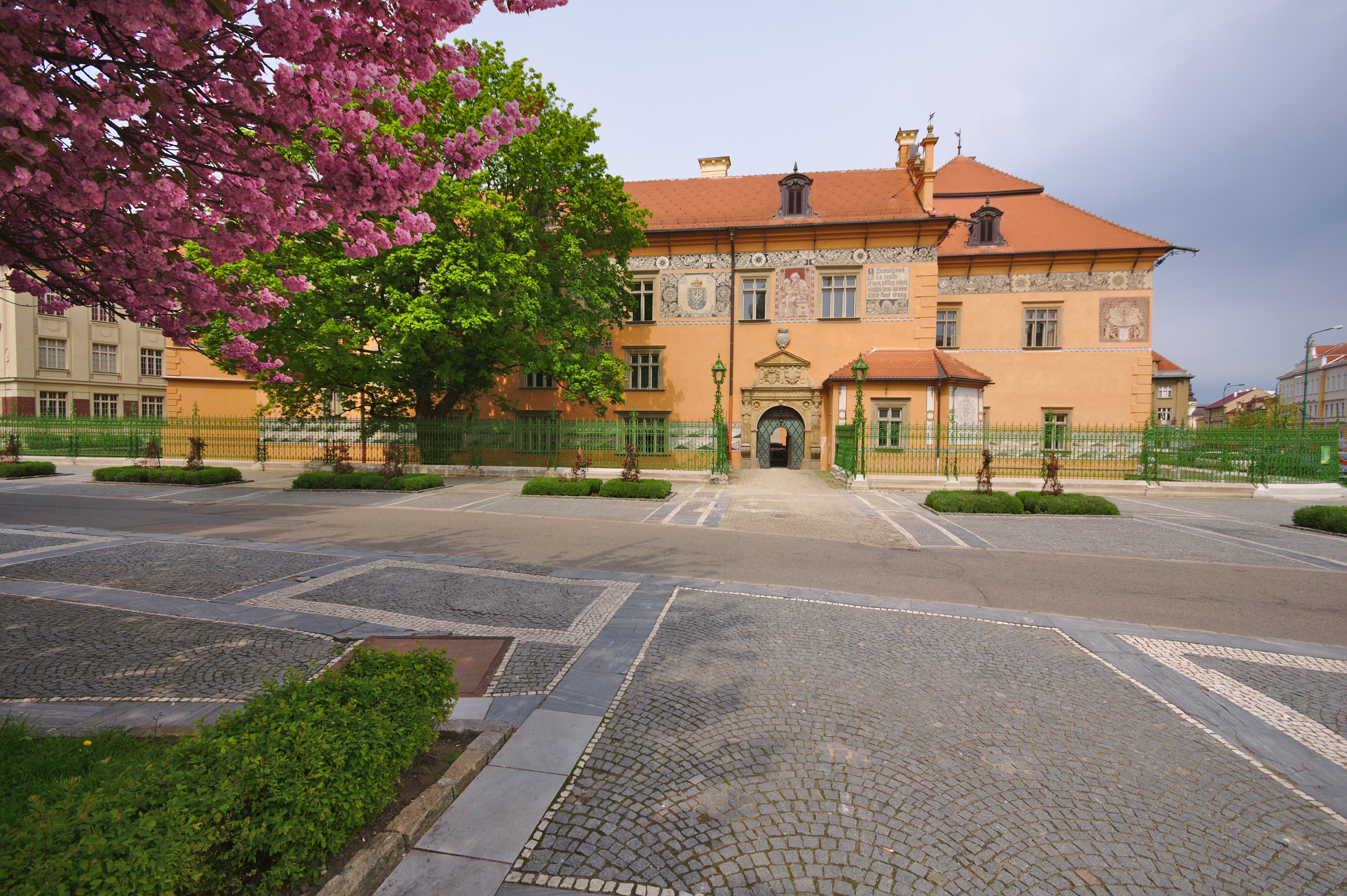
Prostějov Castle

Prostějov consists of seven municipal parts (in brackets population according to the 2021 census):

- Prostějov (34,447)
- Čechovice (1,584)
- Čechůvky (143)
- Domamyslice (1,089)
- Krasice (2,694)
- Vrahovice (3,372)
- Žešov (337)

== Etymology ==
The original name of Prostějov was Prostějovice. The name was derived from the personal name Prostěj (a variant of the name Prostimír), meaning "the village of Prostěj's people". After the village was promoted to a town, the name changed to Prostějov.

== Geography ==
Prostějov is located about 16 kilometres (10 mi) southwest of Olomouc and 45 km (28 mi) northeast of Brno. It lies mostly in a flat agricultural landscape of the Upper Morava Valley. The western tip of the municipal territory extends into the Drahany Highlands and includes the highest point of Prostějov at 368 m (1,207 ft) above sea level. The city is situated at the confluence of the Romže River and Hloučela Stream, which is located in Vrahovice.

== History ==
The first written mention of Prostějov is from 1141. In 1365, the settlement was promoted to a market town and in 1390 to a town. Before 1390, Prostějov was acquired by the Lords of Kravaře and joined to the Plumlov estate. It remained part of it until 1848 and shared its owners and destinies.

An Augustinian monastery was founded in 1391, but it was destroyed before 1430 by the Hussites. From 1454, the Jewish community lived in Prostějov. In 1495, the Plumov estate with Prostějov was bought by the Pernštejn family and the construction of the town walls began. The Prostějov Castle was built in 1522–1526 by Jan of Pernštejn as a part of town walls. In 1568–1572, the castle was rebuilt in the Renaissance style.

The Pernštejn family owned Prostějov until 1599. From 1599 to 1848, it was a property of the Liechtenstein family. The monastery of the Merciful Brothers was established between 1727 and 1730. The Capuchin monastery was established in 1764, but was abolished in 1784.

In 1869, the demolition of the city walls began. Thanks to the Jewish community in particular, Prostějov has become an important commercial and industrial centre. Mass production of textile clothing began in the 1840s and at the end of the century, the textile industry gained a privileged position in the whole of Austria-Hungary (one-third of the state's total production was from Prostějov). In the late 19th century, Prostějov was the third largest city in Moravia after Brno and Jihlava.

In the Austrian Empire and Austria-Hungary, Prostějov was part of the Margraviate of Moravia. In 1918, it became part of independent Czechoslovakia. The period of German occupation lasted from March 1939 until May 1945. During this time, Prostějov was administered as a part of the Protectorate of Bohemia and Moravia. The Jewish community basically disappeared as a result of the Holocaust.

During the socialist period, prefabricated housing estates were built on the outskirts of the city (built in 1963–1990) and extensive demolitions took place in the historic centre.

== Demographics ==
Historical population

Year	Pop.	±%
1869	18,475	—
1880	21,290	+15.2%
1890	24,075	+13.1%
1900	28,659	+19.0%
1910	35,783	+24.9%

Year	Pop.	±%
1921	35,588	−0.5%
1930	38,412	+7.9%
1950	39,146	+1.9%
1961	39,559	+1.1%
1970	41,572	+5.1%

Year	Pop.	±%
1980	47,267	+13.7%
1991	48,898	+3.5%
2001	46,910	−4.1%
2011	44,857	−4.4%
2021	43,666	−2.7%

Source: Censuses

== Economy ==
The city is historically associated with the textile industry. The tradition began already in 1500 when a tailor's guild was founded. In the middle of the 19th century, the first clothing factory in Europe was built here. In 1910, the industry employed 12,000 people.

Oděvní podnik Prostějov, the biggest textile company in the country with about 10,000 employees, was founded in 1964. After the fall of communism in Czechoslovakia, the company failed to restructure and adapt to market mechanisms, and went bankrupt in 2010. Nowadays, the tradition is held by several smaller companies.

Nowadays, the largest industrial employers based in the city are Makovec (meat processor) and Mubea Stabilizer Bar Systems (manufacturer of automotive parts), both employing more than 1,000 people. The largest non-industrial employer is the hospital.

Czech Armed Forces' special forces unit 601. skss is based in Prostějov.

== Transport ==
The D46 motorway (part of the European route E462) from Olomouc to Vyškov runs through Prostějov.

Prostějov lies on the railway line Nezamyslice–Kouty nad Desnou (via Olomouc and Šumperk).

== Sport ==
The city is known for the tennis club TK Agrofert Prostějov, connected with many of the biggest names of the Czech tennis history.

Prostějov is home to the football club 1. SK Prostějov, which plays in Czech National Football League (2nd tier), and to the ice hockey club LHK Jestřábi Prostějov, which plays in the 1st Czech Republic Hockey League (2nd tier).

== Sights ==
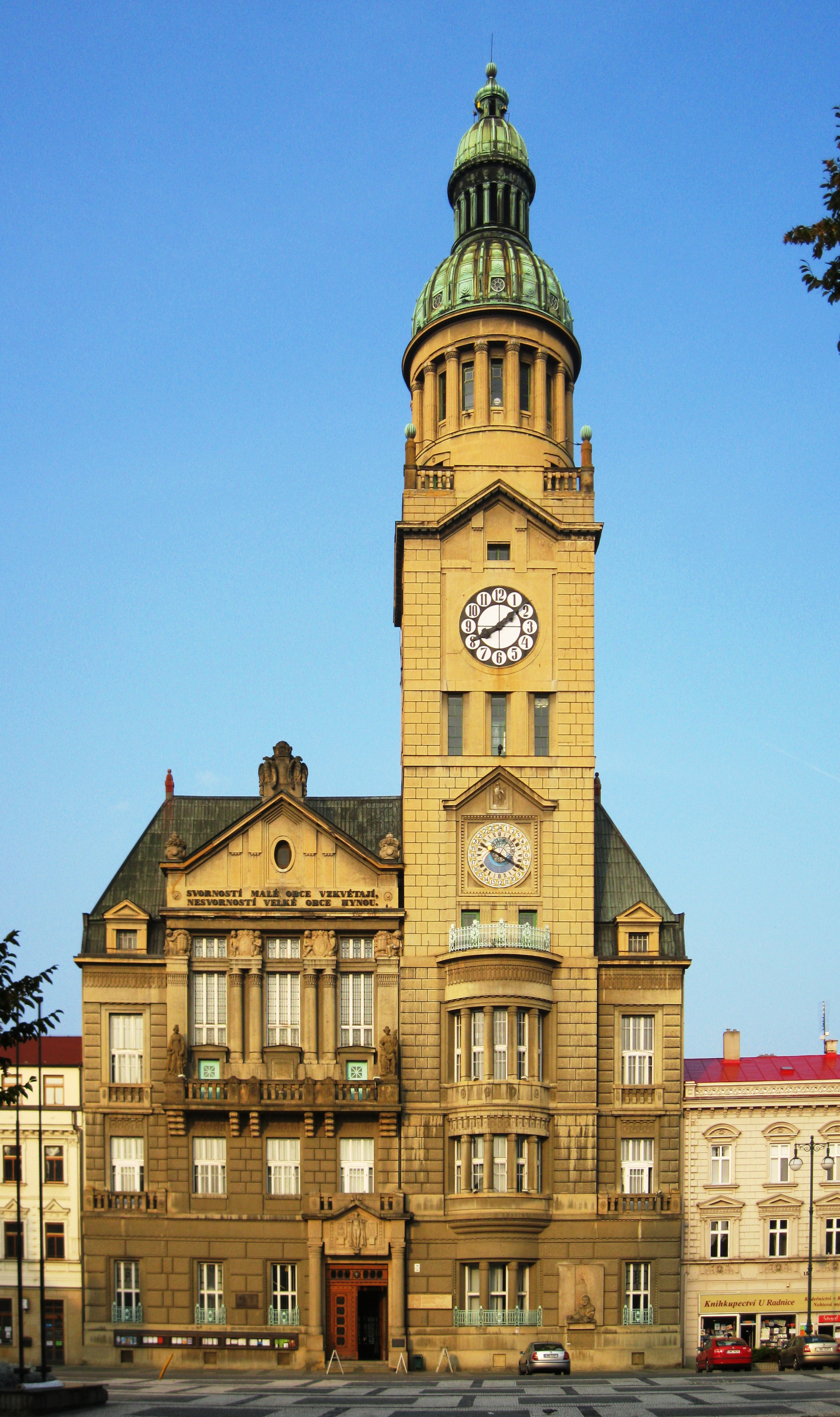
City hall

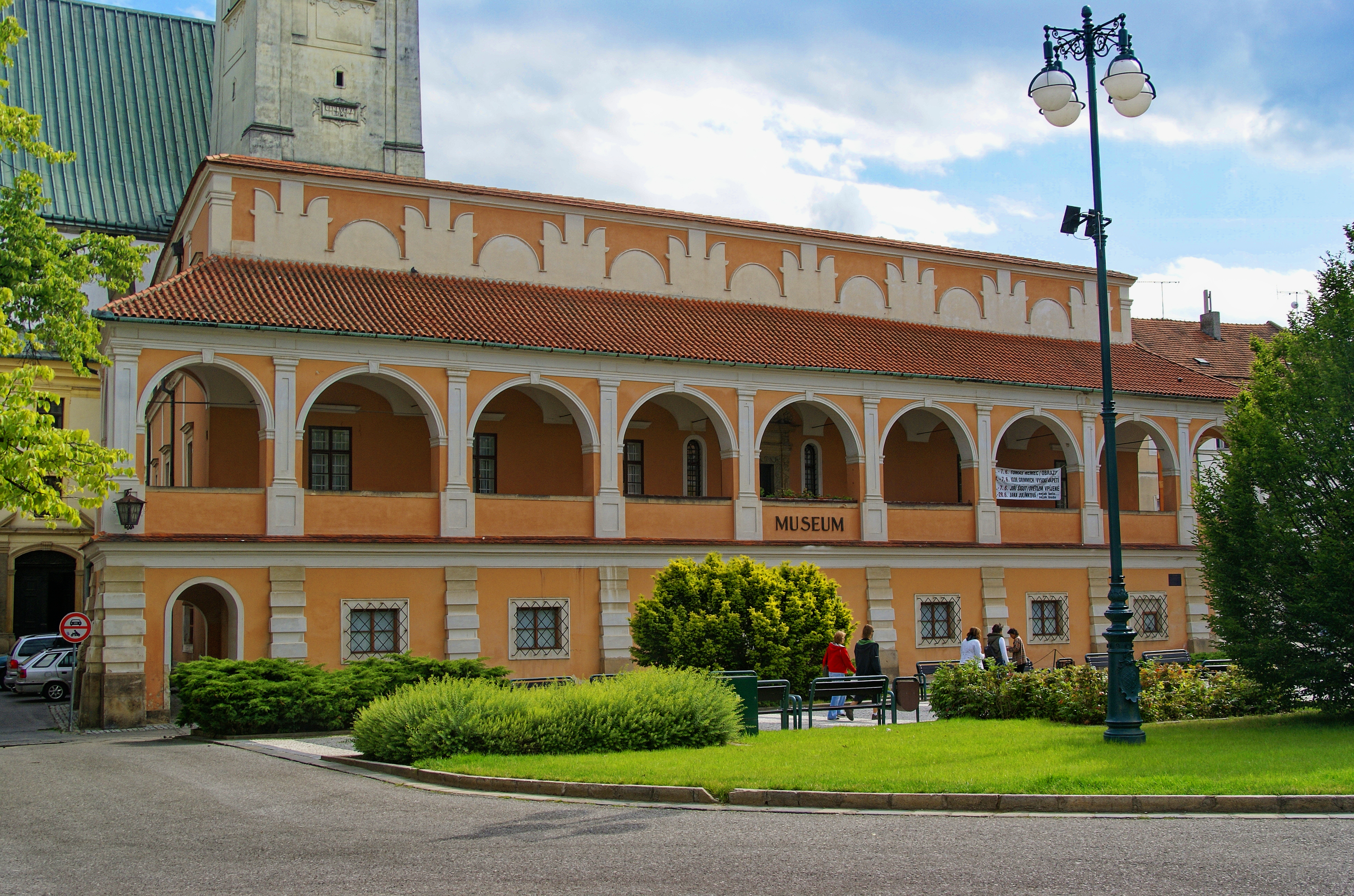
Museum and Gallery in Prostějov

The historic centre is formed by the square Náměstí T. G. Masaryka and its surroundings, which include several other smaller squares. The central square is lined by burgher houses with Renaissance or Baroque cores, and façades mostly from the 19th and 20th centuries. One of the houses is the birthplace of Jiří Wolker, one of the most important natives. The main landmark of the square is the city hall, built in 1911–1914, with a 66 metres (217 ft) high tower, which is open to the public. In the middle of the square is a Baroque Marian column from 1714.

Prostějov Castle on the square Pernštýnské náměstí is one of the most significant buildings in the city. It was reconstructed after 1893 and decorated with modern sgraffito by Jano Köhler. Today it is owned by the city.

The Museum and Gallery in Prostějov is located in the former town hall from 1530. The museum has been housed in this Renaissance building since 1905.

The National House is a masterpiece of Czech modernism and Art Nouveau, protected for its value as a national cultural monument. It was built in 1905–1907.

=== Ecclesiastical monuments ===
The Church of the Exaltation of the Holy Cross, founded together with an Augustinian monastery in 1391, is the oldest monument in Prostějov. The originally Gothic church was later modified in the Baroque style. It is decorated with frescoes by Jano Köhler and with the Way of the Cross cycle by František Bílek.

The Church of Saint John of Nepomuk, built in 1750–1755, is a part of the former monastery of the Merciful Brothers. The Church of Saints Cyril and Methodius was founded together with the Capuchin monastery. In the early 20th century, it was rebuilt in the neo-Baroque style and consecrated to Saints Cyril and Methodius.

The former Old Synagogue was originally a yeshiva, rebuilt into a synagogue with Empire style elements in the 1830s. Today it is privately owned and inaccessible. The former New Synagogue was built opposite the old one in 1904, originally in the Art Nouveau style. After World War II, it was sold to Czechoslovak Hussite Church and arranged as a prayer house of this church, which it is to this day. Other Jewish monuments in the city are several old preserved houses, the new cemetery established in 1908, and the remains of the old cemetery, the surface of which was devastated during the war.

== Notable people ==
- John Filipec (c. 1431 – 1509), bishop and diplomat
- Meir Eisenstadt (c. 1670 – 1744), author of rabbinic literature
- Jonathan Eybeschutz (1690–1764), rabbi
- Moses Sofer (1762–1839), rabbi
- Gideon Brecher (1797–1873), Austrian medical doctor and writer
- Moritz Steinschneider (1816–1907), bibliographer and orientalist
- Ignaz Brüll (1846–1907), Austrian pianist and composer
- Rosa Sonneschein (1847–1932), journalist and editor
- Nathan Porges (1848–1924), rabbi
- Konrad Loewe (1856–1912), Austrian actor and playwright
- Edmund Husserl (1859–1938), German philosopher
- Ondřej Přikryl (1862–1936), writer and politician; mayor of Prostějov in 1914–1919
- Rudolf Alfred Höger (1877–1930), Austrian painter
- Jana Jeništová-Fiedlerová (1888–1966), photographer
- Carmen Cartellieri (1891–1954), Austrian actress
- Jiří Wolker (1900–1924), poet, journalist and playwright
- Edvard Valenta (1901–1978), journalist and writer
- Lola Beer Ebner (1910–1997), Israeli fashion designer
- Otto Wichterle (1913–1998), chemist and inventor
- Otakar Hořínek (1929–2015), sport shooter, Olympic medalist
- Antonín Přidal (1935–2017), translator and writer
- Milena Dvorská (1938–2009), actress
- Karel Dyba (1940–2024), economist and politician
- Oldřich Machač (1946–2011), ice hockey player
- Nina Škottová (1946–2018), politician
- Rostislav Václavíček (1946–2022), footballer
- Vlastimil Petržela (born 1953), football player and manager
- Luděk Mikloško (1961–2026), footballer
- Petr Hořava (born 1963), physicist
- Paulina Porizkova (born 1965), Swedish-American model and actress
- Karel Nováček (born 1965), tennis player
- Robert Změlík (born 1969), decathlete, Olympic winner
- Radoslav Látal (born 1970, football player and manager
- Gabriela Míčová (born 1975), actress
- Lukáš Krajíček (born 1983), ice hockey player
- Petra Cetkovská (born 1985), tennis player
- Petra Kvitová (born 1990), tennis player; lives here
- Jakub Menšík (born 2005), tennis player
- Jan Kumstát (born 2007), tennis player

== Twin towns – sister cities ==
Prostějov is twinned with:

- Środa Wielkopolska, Poland
- Vysoké Tatry, Slovakia
