= Jan Kotěra =

Czech architect

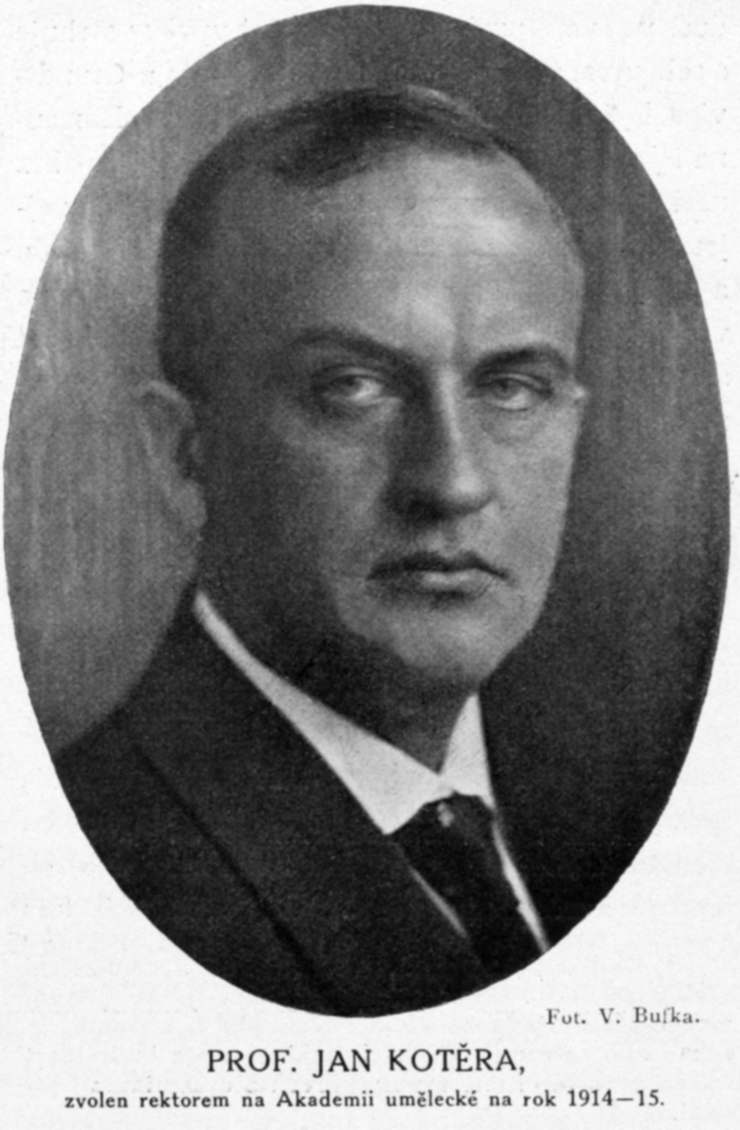
- 1923 portrait by Vladimír Jindřich Bufka
- Born: 18 December 1871; Brno, Moravia, Austria-Hungary
- Died: 17 April 1923 (aged 51); Prague, Czechoslovakia
- Known for: Architecture

Jan Kotěra (18 December 1871 – 17 April 1923) was a Czech architect, artist and interior designer. He was one of the key figures of modern architecture in Bohemia.

== Biography ==
Kotěra was born in Brno in Moravia, Austria-Hungary to a Czech father and German-speaking mother. He studied architecture in Vienna during the waning days of the Austro-Hungarian Empire under the Viennese master Otto Wagner.

Kotěra returned to Prague in 1897 to help found a dynamic movement of Czech nationalist artists and architects centered on the Mánes Union of Fine Arts. Strongly influenced by the work of the Vienna Secession, his work bridged late nineteenth-century architectural design and early modernism. Kotěra collaborated with Czech sculptors Jan Štursa, Stanislav Sucharda, and Stanislav's son Vojtěch Sucharda on a number of buildings.

As a teacher, Kotěra trained a generation of Czech architects, including Josef Gočár, who would bring Czech modernism to its pinnacle in the years leading up to the Nazi occupation in 1939. Kotěra was one of a number of Czech architects to design the "Bata houses" and Bata shoe factory at East Tilbury, Essex, England. These are considered Modernist landmarks of industry and a company town.

== Works ==
- Museum of Eastern Bohemia in Hradec Králové, (1908–1912)
- Peterka House, 12 Wenceslas Square, Prague (1899–1900)
- National House, Prostějov
- Trmal Villa - an early rustic villa in Prague
- Villa of Tomáš Baťa in Zlín
- Faculty of Law of Charles University in Prague (1924–1927)
- Two monuments for members of the Perutz family at the New Jewish Cemetery

== Gallery ==
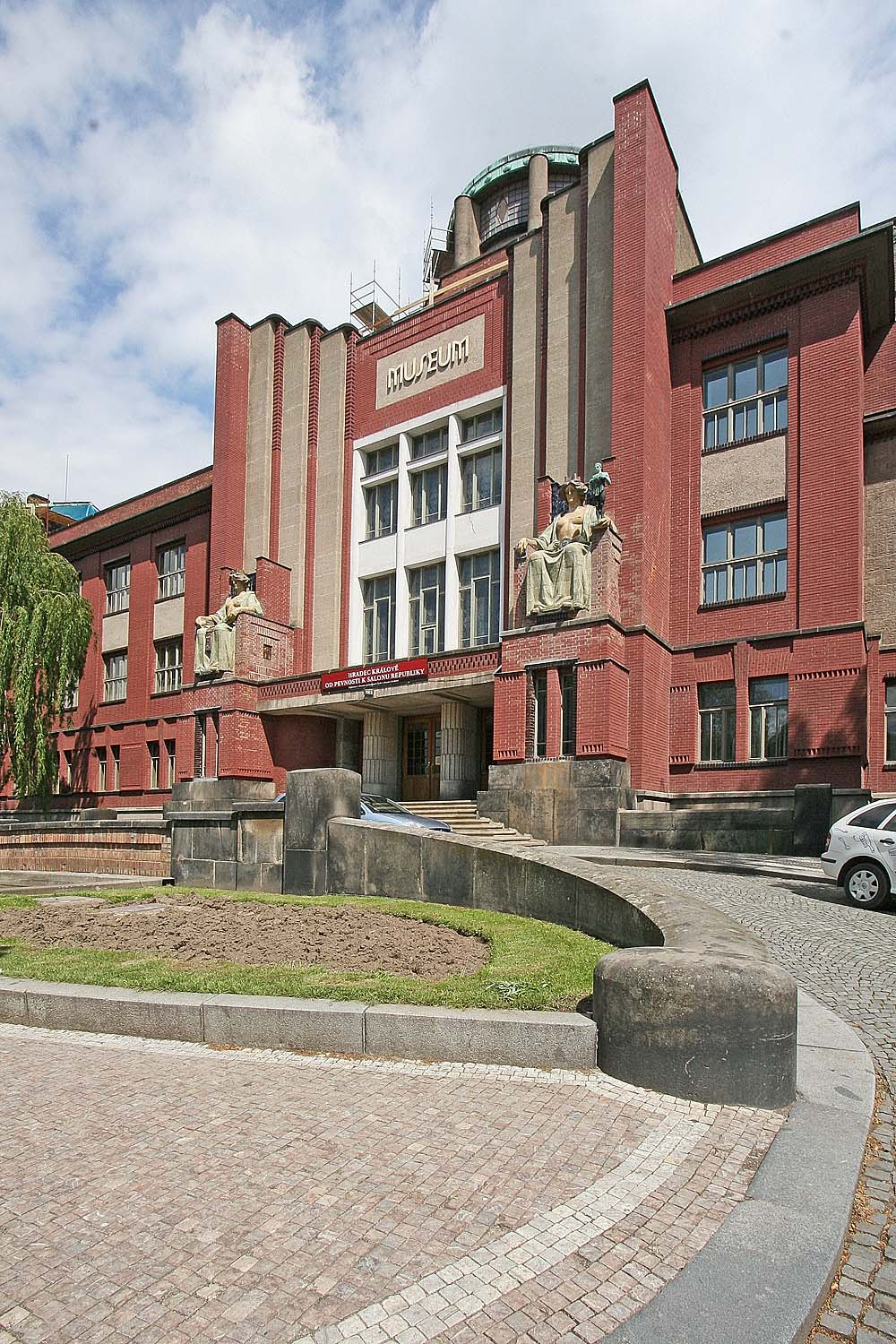
Museum of Eastern Bohemia, Hradec Králové

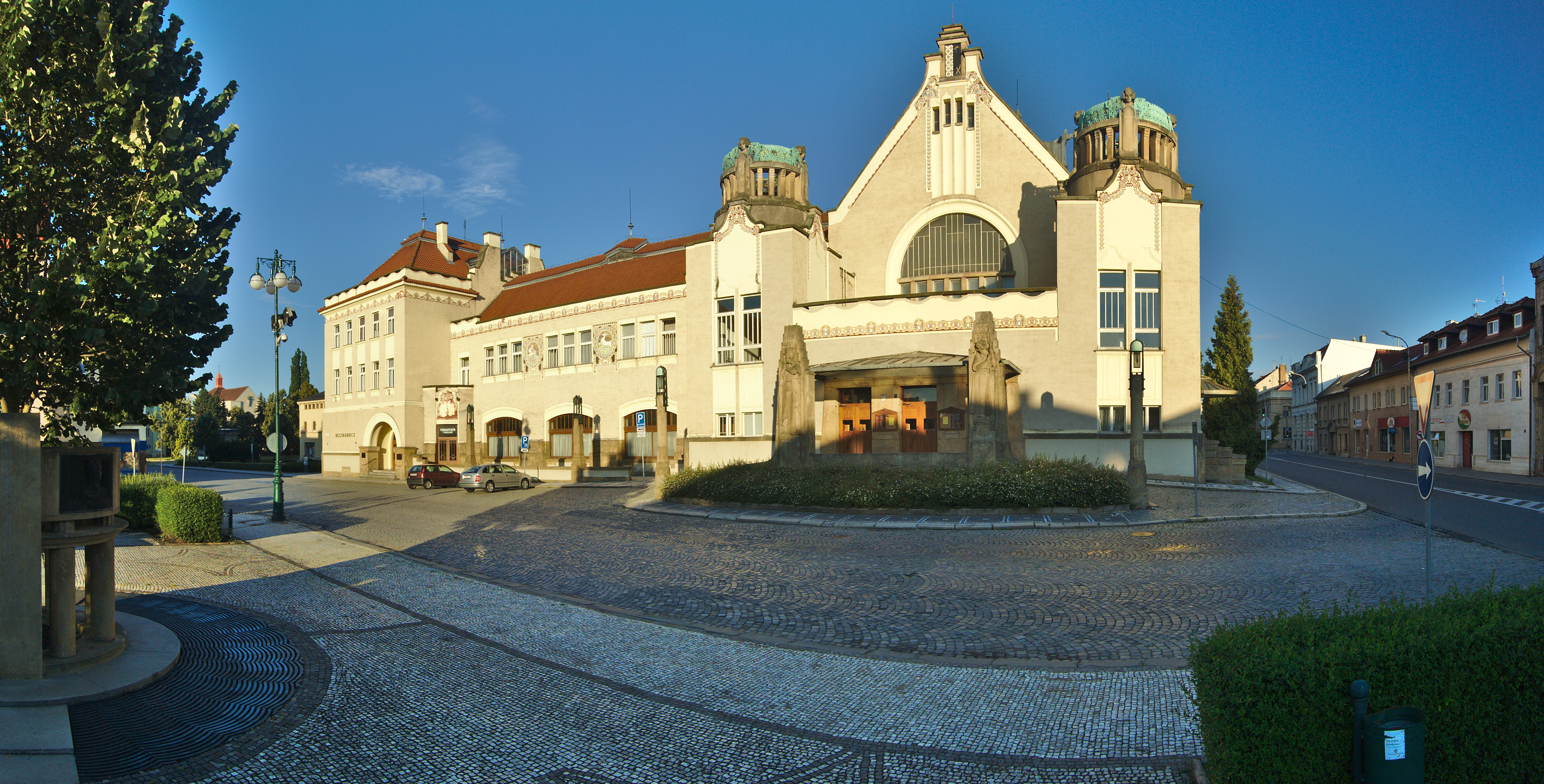
National House, Prostějov

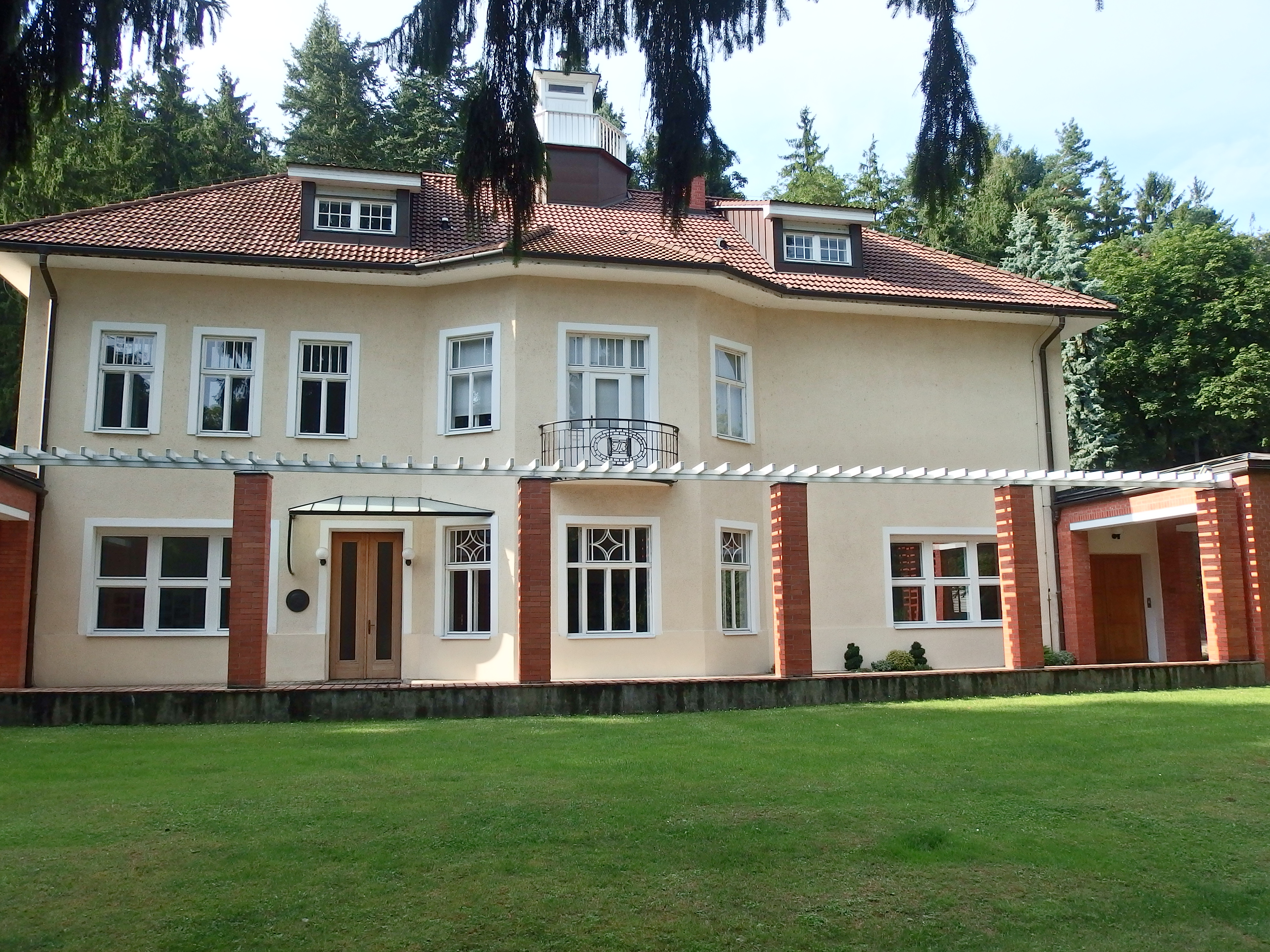
Baťa's villa, Zlín

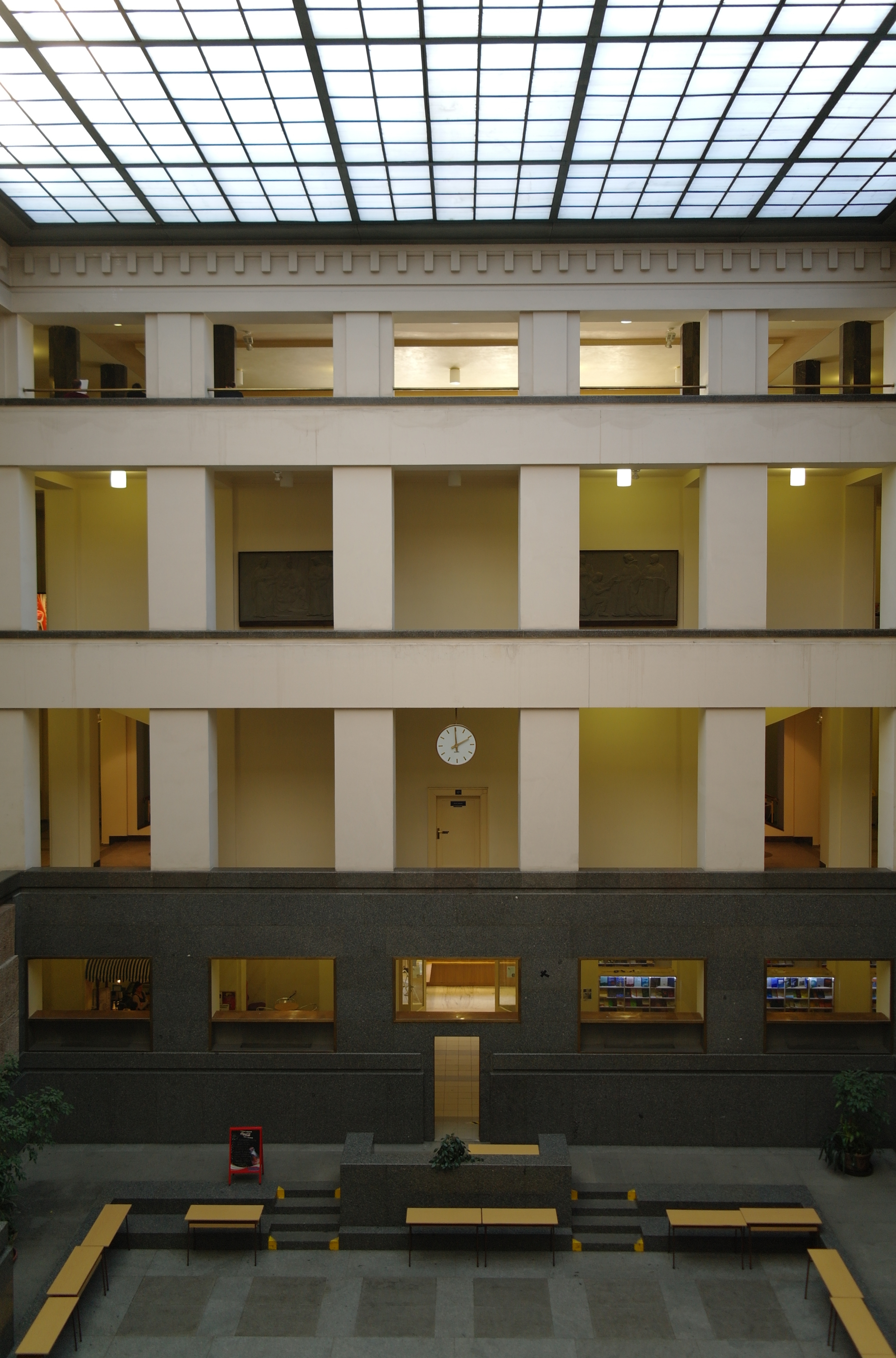
Faculty of Law, Prague

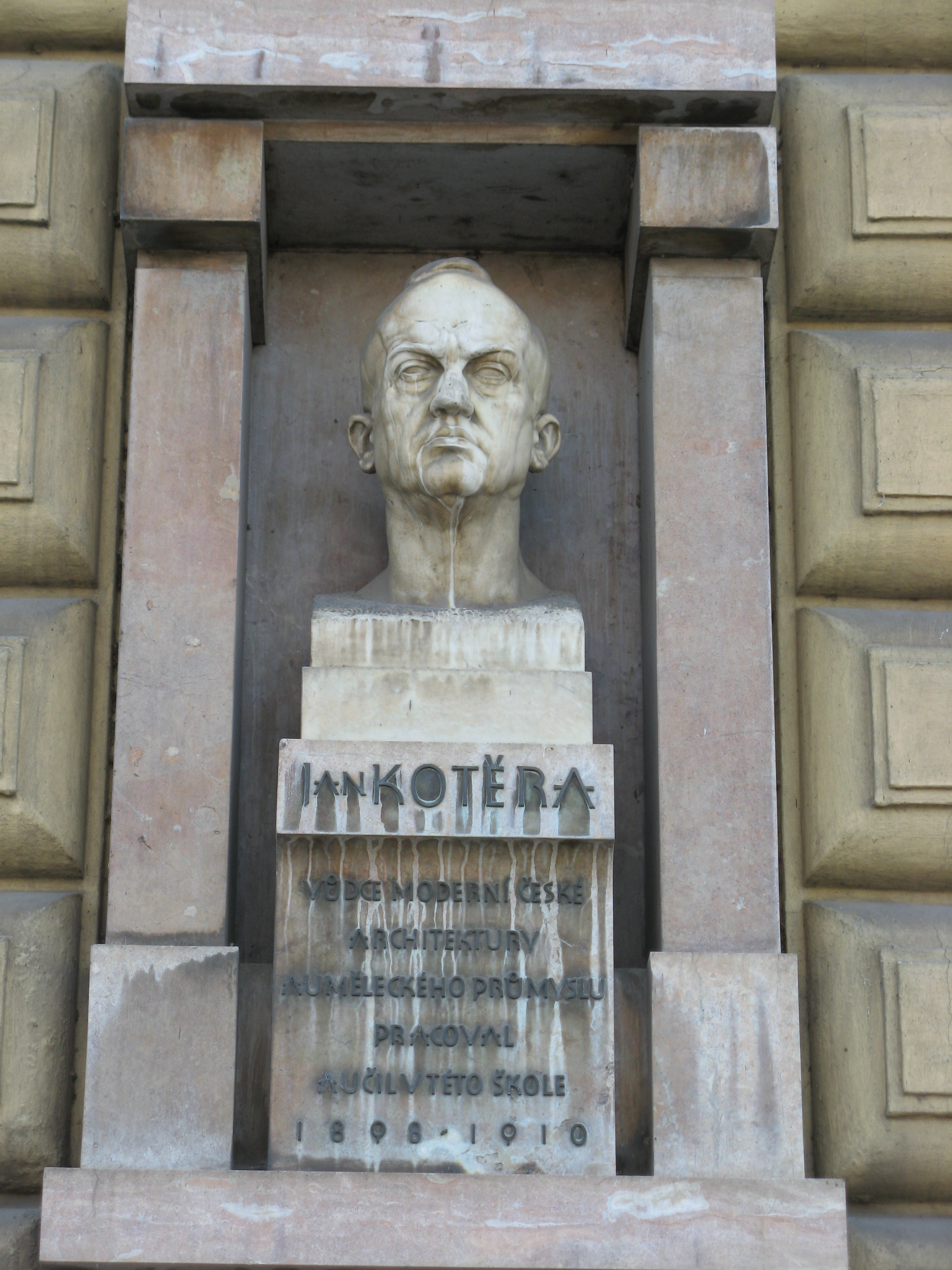
Bust in Prague
