= Jana Jeništová-Fiedlerová =

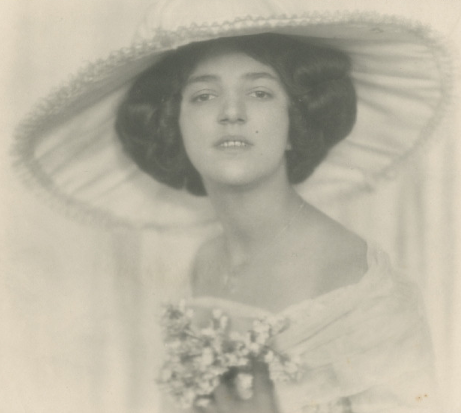
Jeništová-Fiedlerová in 1910

Jana Jeništová-Fiedlerová, also Joanna or Jeanette (17 February 1888 – 11 November 1966) was a Czech photographer. She was a co-owner of a photo atelier in Prostějov in Austria-Hungary (now in Czech Republic). She was one of the first Czech women photographers to work in artistic photography and was awarded at several international photography exhibitions.

She became engaged in photography in her father's photo studio in 1908, and already in 1910 she was awarded silver medal at an exhibition in Brno. Later she was awarded bronze medal in Berlin and a honortary diploma in Budapest.

Both her father, Franz Fiedler and brother, also Franz Fiedler, were photographers.

== See also ==
- Anna Fiedlerová (1841–1919), Julie Jirečková (1878–1963), other early Czech women photographers
