= Antonín Veith =

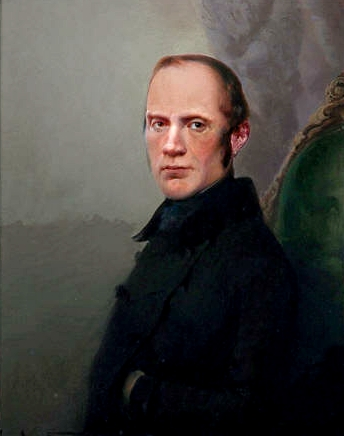
Antonín Veith; artist unknown

Antonín Veith, or Weith (3 January 1793 – 19 December 1853) was a Czech patron of the arts. He worked to promote the peaceful coexistence of Czechs and Germans in Bohemia.

== Life and work ==
Veith was born on 3 January 1793 in České Budějovice, southern Bohemia. His father, Jacob Veith (1758–1833), was a weaver and textile entrepreneur from Volary, who acquired a large number of estates throughout Bohemia. He studied at the Academic Gymnasium in Prague, where he learned Czech, and was exposed to French and English literature. He spent the year 1817 in England. In 1833, he inherited his father's manor in Liběchov, and his estates in Kokořín.

He was very popular with the local people, opening Czech and German schools, and gathering together a large circle of authors and scholars, for whom he served as a patron. These included the philosopher Bernard Bolzano, the physician and naturalist Julius Vincenz von Krombholz, the poets František Klácel and Josef Václav Frič, the historian František Palacký, the journalist Karel Sabina, and the lawyer and politician František August Brauner.

The painters Quido Mánes and Josef Navrátil, who decorated the manor with frescoes, and the sculptor Václav Levý all worked at Liběchov. Levý initially worked for him as a cook, but after displaying his artistic talents, Veith sent him to Prague to study with the sculptor, František Xaver Linn (1802–1848). Later, Veith sent him to Munich to complete his studies with Ludwig Schwanthaler.

In 1837, he decided to create a monument to the nation's heroes near Tupadly. It would comprise twenty-four statues of notable Czechs and Germans. The structure to house them, now known as Slavín Castle, was designed by Wilhelm Gail. The statues were commissioned from Schwanthaler, who died when he had finished only eight. Veith never completed the project, due to financial difficulties. After the bankruptcy of his brother, Václav (1787–1852), who was a farmer in Kolín, he took over administration of the family's estates, but was unable to make them profitable and went further into debt.

He died on 19 December 1853 in Liběchov, at the age of 60. After his death, the estates were inherited by his nephew, Antonín Ladislav Veith (1836–1913), who gradually sold them off.
