= Karel Liebscher =

Czech painter

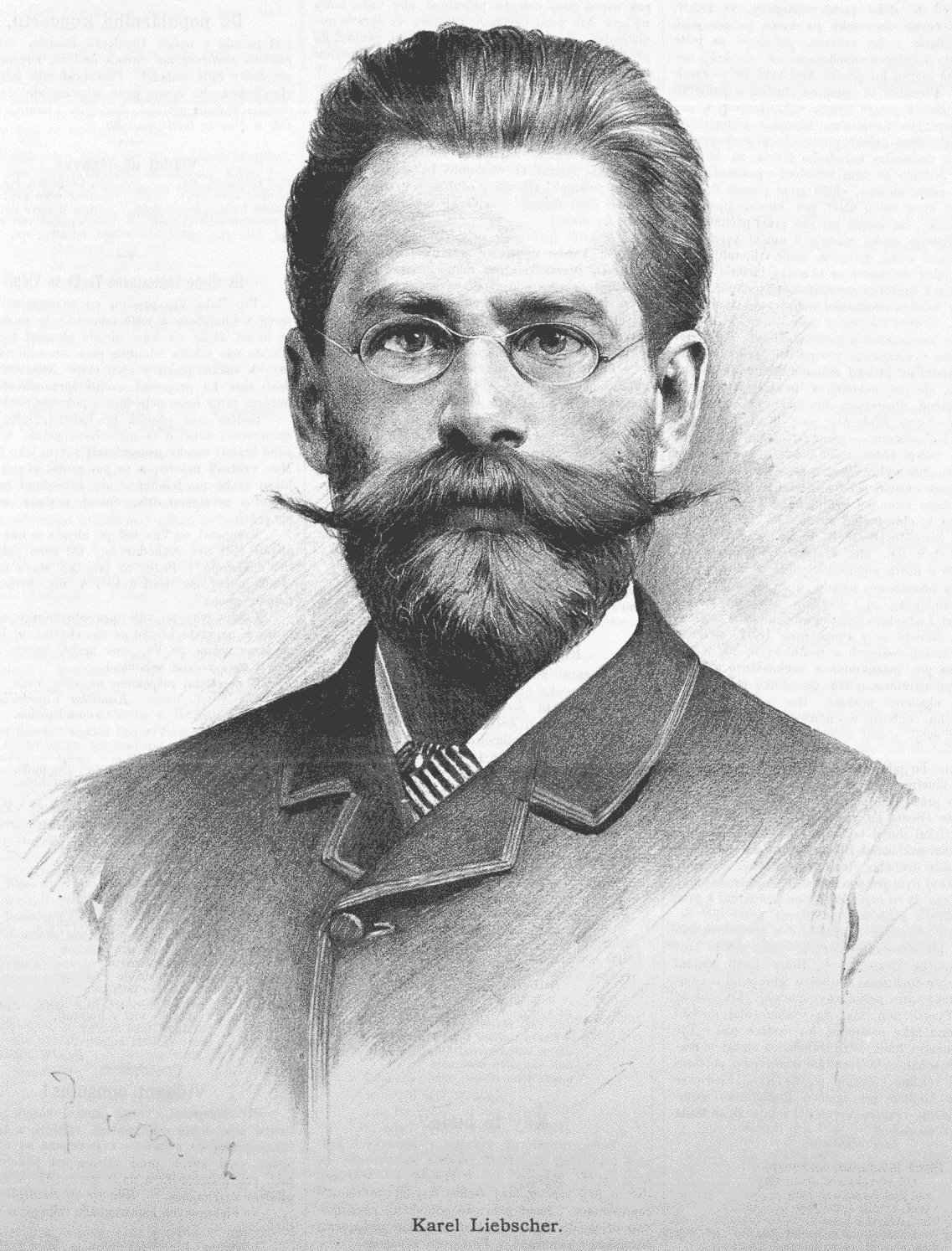
Karel Liebscher by Jan Vilímek (1887)

Karel Liebscher (24 February 1851 – 20 April 1906) was a Czech landscape painter and illustrator. His brother was the history painter Adolf Liebscher.

== Biography ==
Liebscher was born in Prague on 24 February 1851. He displayed an early talent for drawing but, at first, did not consider that to be a practical way to earn a living. He studied engineering and took a position as an assistant with the Building Authority. After a short time, however, he came down with a nervous disorder (possibly from drinking too much coffee) that required rest and quiet. During stays at various health spas in Gräfenberg, Tábor and Letiny, he studied nature and began painting. His first illustrations were published in 1879. He enrolled at the Academy of Fine Arts Vienna in 1883 where he studied with Eduard von Lichtenfels.

Liebscher's first major exhibition took place in Prague in 1885, where he exhibited with his brother Adolf. The primary themes of his works were Czech monuments, old buildings and landscapes. He later travelled to what is now Croatia, producing images of the Mediterranean coast. Many of his illustrations were used by Jan Otto in his regular magazines (Zlatá Praha) and special edition books (Bohemia by Bedřich Bernau; Castles and Chateaux by August Sedláček).

He died in Prague on 20 April 1906.

== Selected illustrations ==
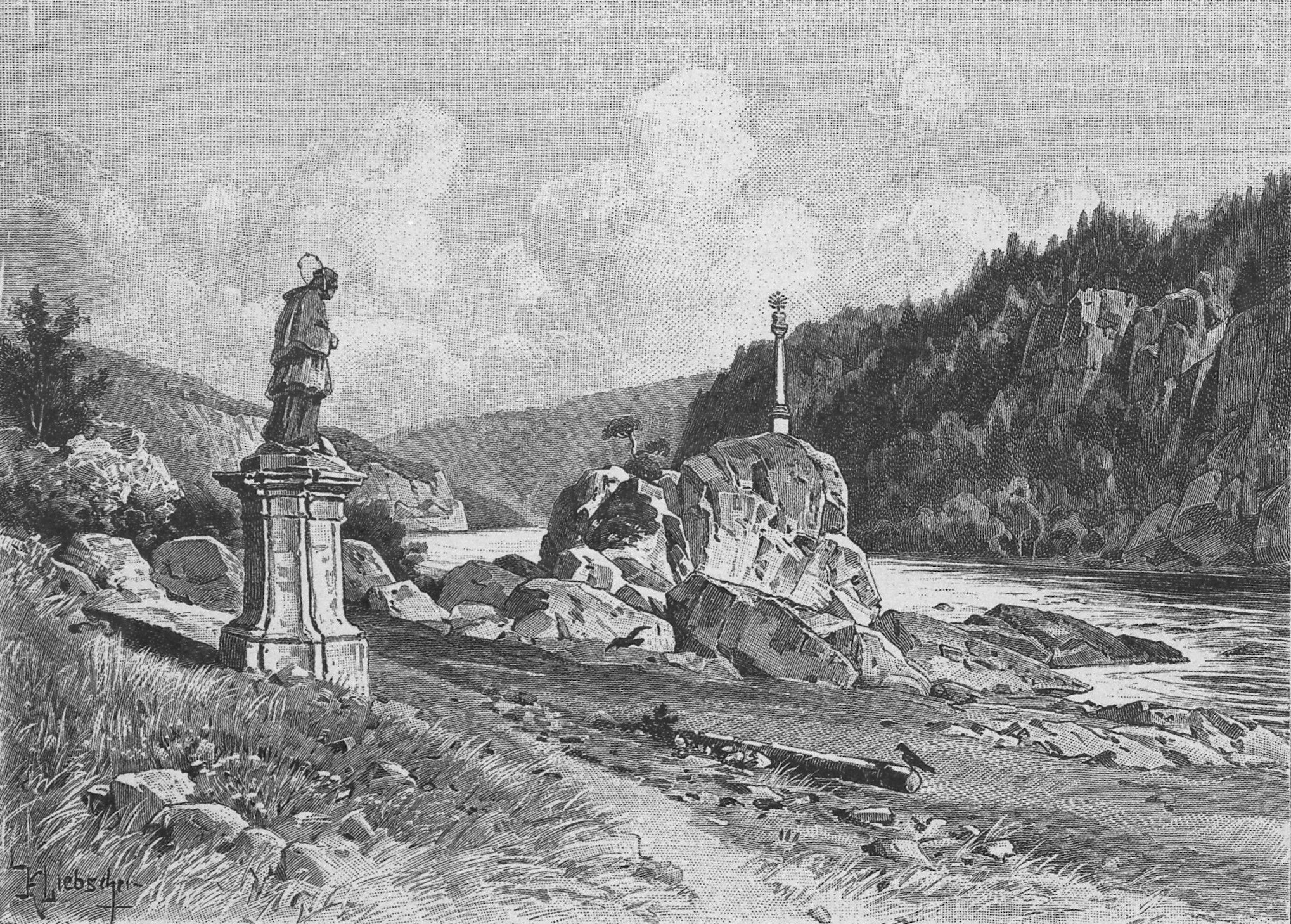
"St John's Rapids"
on the Vltava

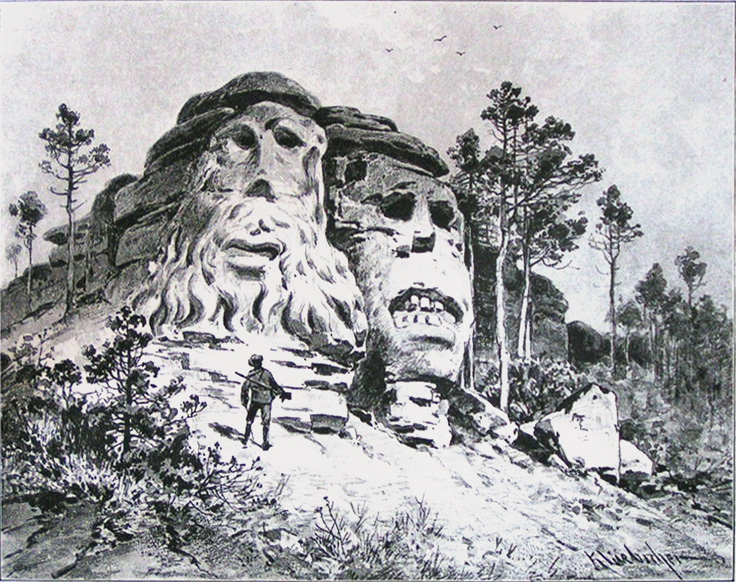
"Čertovy hlavy", rock sculptures
by Václav Levý near Želízy

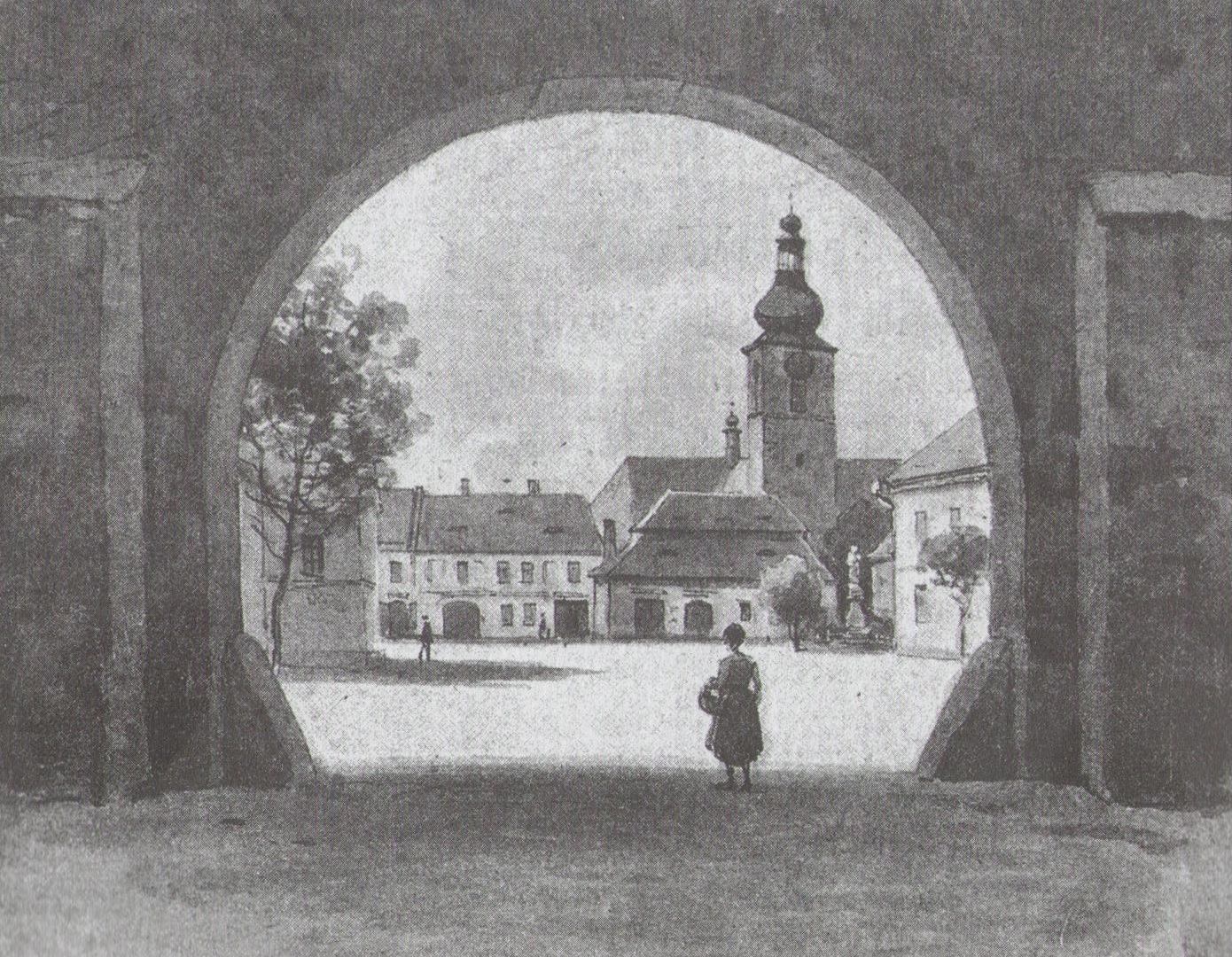
Church of the Nativity of John the Baptist, Přibyslav

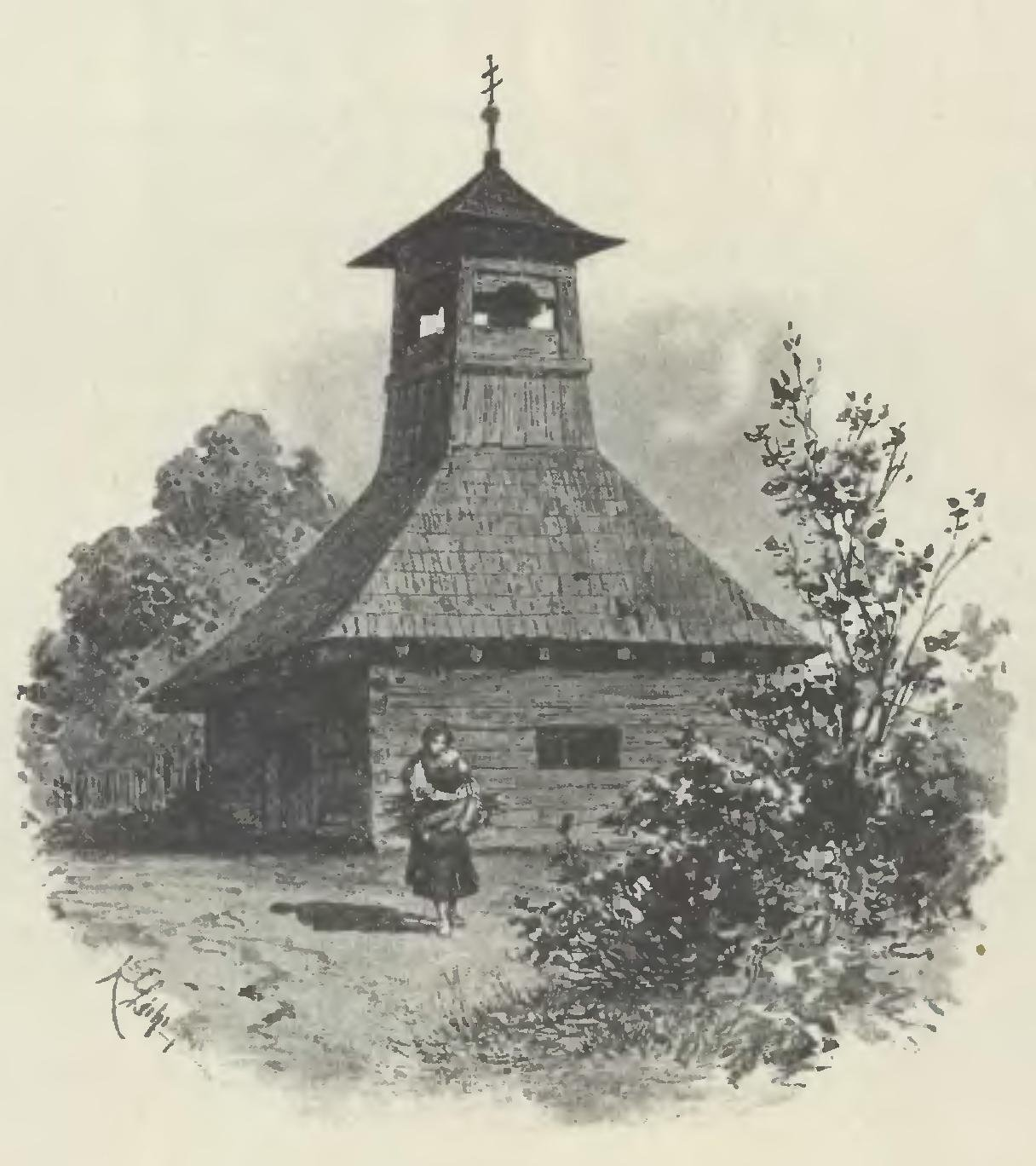
Wooden belfry in Lichkov
