= Loo =

Loo or LOO may refer to:

== Places ==
- Loo Microdistrict, a historic district of Sochi, Russia
- Loo (river), Krasnodar Krai, Russia
- Loo, Estonia, a small borough in Jõelähtme Parish, Harju County, Estonia
- Loo (village), a village in Jõelähtme Parish, Harju County, Estonia
- Lõo, a village in Lääneranna Parish, Pärnu County, Estonia
- Looe, a town in Cornwall, United Kingdom
- Loo, Duiven, a village in the province of Gelderland in the Netherlands
- Loo (Overijssel), a village in the province of Overijssel in the Netherlands
- Loo (Bernheze), a village in the municipality of Berheze in the province of North Brabant in the Netherlands
- Loo (Bergeijk), a village in the municipality of Bergeijk in the province of North Brabant in the Netherlands
- Loo (Uden), a village in the municipality of Uden in the province of North Brabant in the Netherlands
- Waterloo, Ontario, shortened as 'Loo or "The 'Loo"
- Lu (state), birthplace of Confucius (transliteration as used e.g. in translations by James Legge)

== Buildings ==
- Het Loo Palace, palace in the Netherlands
- Hofje van Loo, courtyard in Haarlem, the Netherlands

== Transport ==
- LOO, the IATA code for L'Mekrareg Airport in Algeria
- LOO, the National Rail code for Looe railway station in the UK

== Language ==
- Loo language, an Adamawa language of Nigeria
- loo, the ISO 639-3 code for the Lombo language, spoken by the Turumbu people in the Democratic Republic of the Congo

== Other uses ==
- Loo (surname)
- Loo (novel), Nepali novel by Nayan Raj Pandey
- Big Loo, a toy robot manufactured by Louis Marx and Company for the holiday season of 1963
- Loo (wind), a strong, hot and dry wind which blows over Northern and parts of Western India during day time in summer
- Loo (card game), also known as Lanterloo, a card game
- Loo, informal term for a toilet
- Loo, a unicorn in L. Frank Baum's The Magic of Oz
- "Loo Loo Land", a 2020 episode of Helluva Boss
- Loo table, a round or oval table on a pillar, with a hinged top. Originally used when playing the card game, Loo
- Leave-one-out cross-validation (LOO or LOOCV), a statistical method for evaluating predictive models

== See also ==
- Lieu (disambiguation)
- Loos (disambiguation)
