= Loos (surname) =

Loos is a Dutch and Low German surname. It can be of toponymic, patronymic or descriptive origin. In the Low Countries, Lo/Loos was a short form of Lodewijk (akin to Louis) while in North Germany the name may be derived from Nikolaus. Notable people with this surname include:

== Arts ==
- Adolf Loos (1870–1933), Austrian-Czech architect
- Anita Loos (1888–1981), American screenwriter and author
- Anna Loos (born 1970), German actress and singer
- Charles Loos (born 1951), Belgian jazz pianist and composer
- Daniel Friedrich Loos (1735–1819), German medallist, engraver
- Friedrich Loos (1797–1890), Austrian painter, etcher and lithographer
- Lina Loos (1882–1950), Austrian actress and writer
- Mary Loos (1910–2004), American actress
- Theodor Loos (1883–1954), German actor

== Sports ==
- Dave Loos (born 1947), American basketball coach and athletic director
- Eddie Loos (1893–1950), American golfer
- Ludo Loos (1955–2019), Belgian road bicycle racer
- Michelle Loos, New Zealand footballer
- Miloslav Loos (1914–2010), Czech cyclist
- Pete Loos (1878–1956), American baseball pitcher
- Valentin Loos (1895–1942), Czech ice hockey player

== Other ==
- Bernhard Loos (born 1955), German politician
- Cornelius Loos (1546–1595), Dutch Catholic priest and theologian
- François Loos (born 1953), French diplomat
- Gerhard Loos (1916–1944), German Luftwaffe fighter ace
- Jan Frans Loos (1799–1871), Belgian liberal politician
- John L. Loos (1918–2011), American historian
- Jos Loos, Luxembourgish scouting leader
- Kurt Loos (1859–1933), German forester and ornithologist
- R. Beers Loos (1860–1944), American journalist and newspaper publisher
- Rebecca Loos (born 1977), Dutch-Spanish model and media personality
- Walter Loos (1923–2004), German Luftwaffe fighter ace
- Wilhelm Loos (1911–1988), German World War II army officer
- Wolfgang Loos (born 1955), German Luftwaffe fighter ace

== See also ==
- Loos (disambiguation)
