= Los =

LOS, Los, LoS, or Łoś may refer to:

== Arts and entertainment ==
- The Land of Stories, a series of children's novels by Chris Colfer
- Los, or the Crimson King, a character in Stephen King's novels
- Los (band), a British indie rock band from 2008 to 2011
- Los (Blake), a character in William Blake's poetry
- Los (rapper) (born 1982), stage name of American rapper Carlos Coleman
- "Los", a song from the Rammstein album Reise, Reise

== Locations ==
- Îles de Los, Guinea
- Los, Sweden
- Łoś, Masovian Voivodeship, Poland
- Los, a small crater on Mars

== Military ==
- PZL.37 Łoś, Polish bomber aircraft
- Los (hunting rifle) (Лось), Soviet hunting rifle
- ORP Łoś, Polish minesweeper

== Science and technology ==
- Length of stay, the duration of a single episode of hospitalisation
- Level of service, a measure used by traffic engineers
- Line-of-sight
- LineageOS, a free and open-source operating system for smartphones and tablet computers

== Other uses ==
- Law of the sea
- League of the South, a neo-Confederate group
- Line of scrimmage, in American football
- Lipooligosaccharide, a bacterial lipopolysaccharide with a low-molecular-weight
- LOS AS, a Norwegian electricity supplier and subsidiary of Agder Energi
- Los (surname)
- los, ISO 639 code for the Loniu language of Papua New Guinea
- LOS, the IATA code for Murtala Muhammed International Airport in Lagos, Nigeria
- LOS, the National Rail code for Lostwithiel railway station in Cornwall, UK

== See also ==
- Loos (disambiguation)
- Lost (disambiguation)
- LDOS (disambiguation)
