= Václav Levý =

Czech sculptor

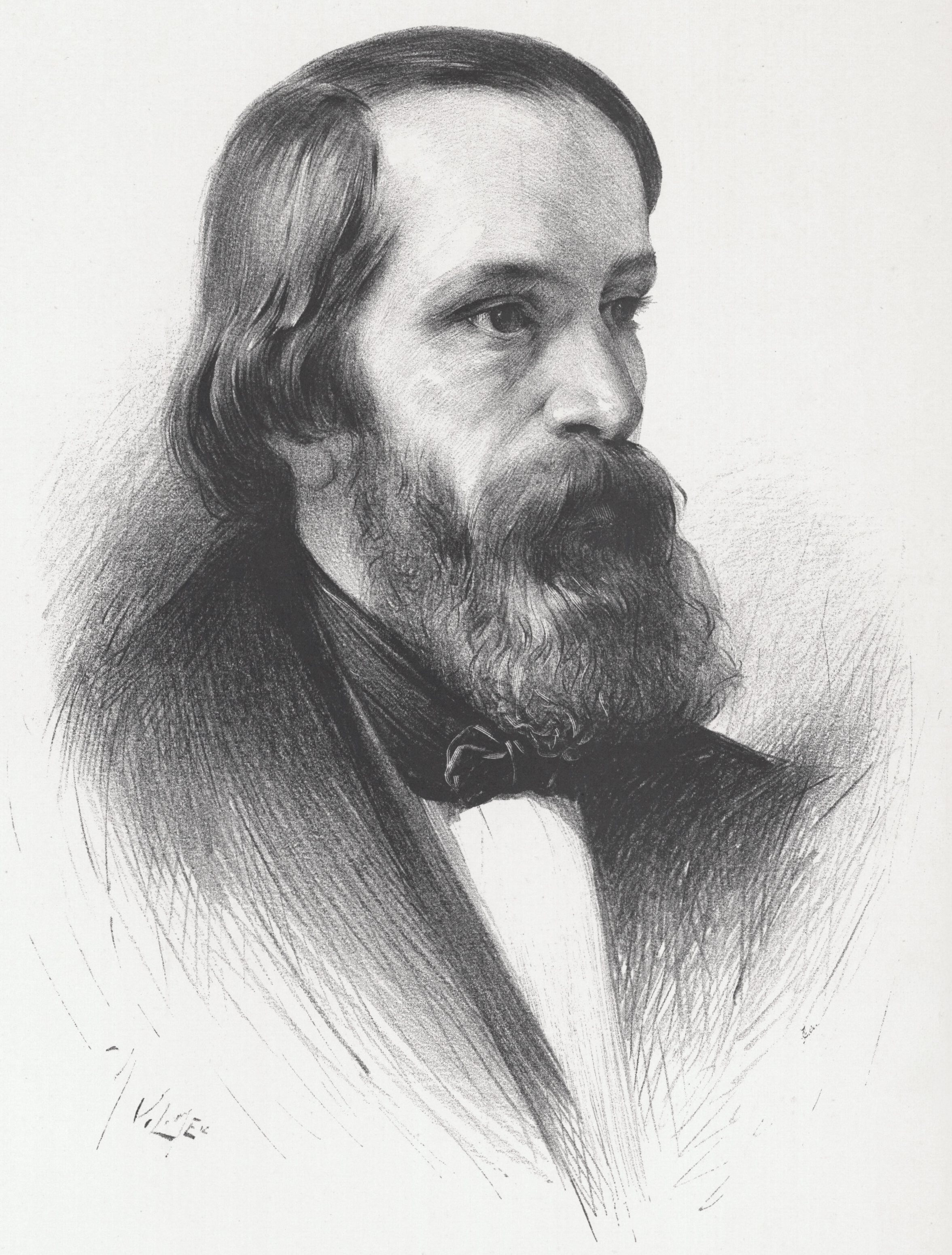
Drawing of Levý by Jan Vilímek

Václav Levý (also known as Wenzel Lewy; 14 September 1820 – 30 April 1870) was a Czech sculptor. He was considered to be one of the pioneers of the modern style in Bohemia.

== Biography ==
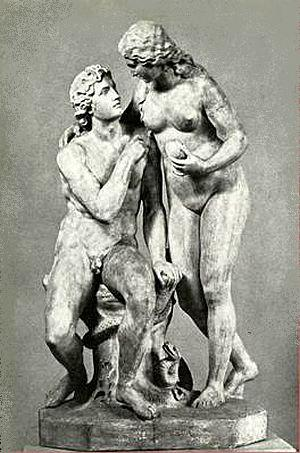
Adam and Eve (1849)

Levý was born in the village of Nebřeziny in Bohemia, Austrian Empire (today part of Plasy, Czech Republic). He was the son of a shoemaker. When he was two years old, the family moved to Kožlany, where they remained. He showed an early aptitude for carving, creating several figures of the Virgin Mary and crucifixes. His parents were not sympathetic, however, and sought to apprentice him to a carpenter. At the urging of a local parson, he was sent away for an education, first to a certain abbey in Plzeň, then to the Augustinian monastery in Lnáře, where he became a cook, later serving a brief apprenticeship in Dresden.

Upon returning from Dresden, he made the chance acquaintance of Antonín Veith, a landowner who was also a patron of the arts, and entered his service as a cook at his estate in Liběchov village near Mělník in 1844. His talent for sculpture was soon noticed by many of Veith's guests and, on the advice of the painter Josef Matěj Navrátil, he was sent to Prague to study with the sculptor František Xaver Linn (1802–1848). However, Levý came to the conclusion that Linn was a mediocre sculptor who had nothing to teach him, so he returned to Liběchov.

It was there, in 1845, at the suggestion of Veith's librarian, an Augustinian professor from Brno named František Klácel, that Levý began creating the reliefs on a rock massif situated in wooded hill near Liběchov that are now known as the "Klácelka Cave." Levý probably took his inspiration for the sculptures from Klácel's poem Ferina Lišák (a fable about a fox). The attention attracted by these reliefs encouraged Veith to send him to Munich for studies with Ludwig Schwanthaler, where he was taught the Academic style. It was here that he produced one of his best-known works Adam and Eve in 1849. He then returned to Klácelka, adding motifs from Czech history, as well as working on new decorations for the castle chapel.

=== 1850–1870 ===
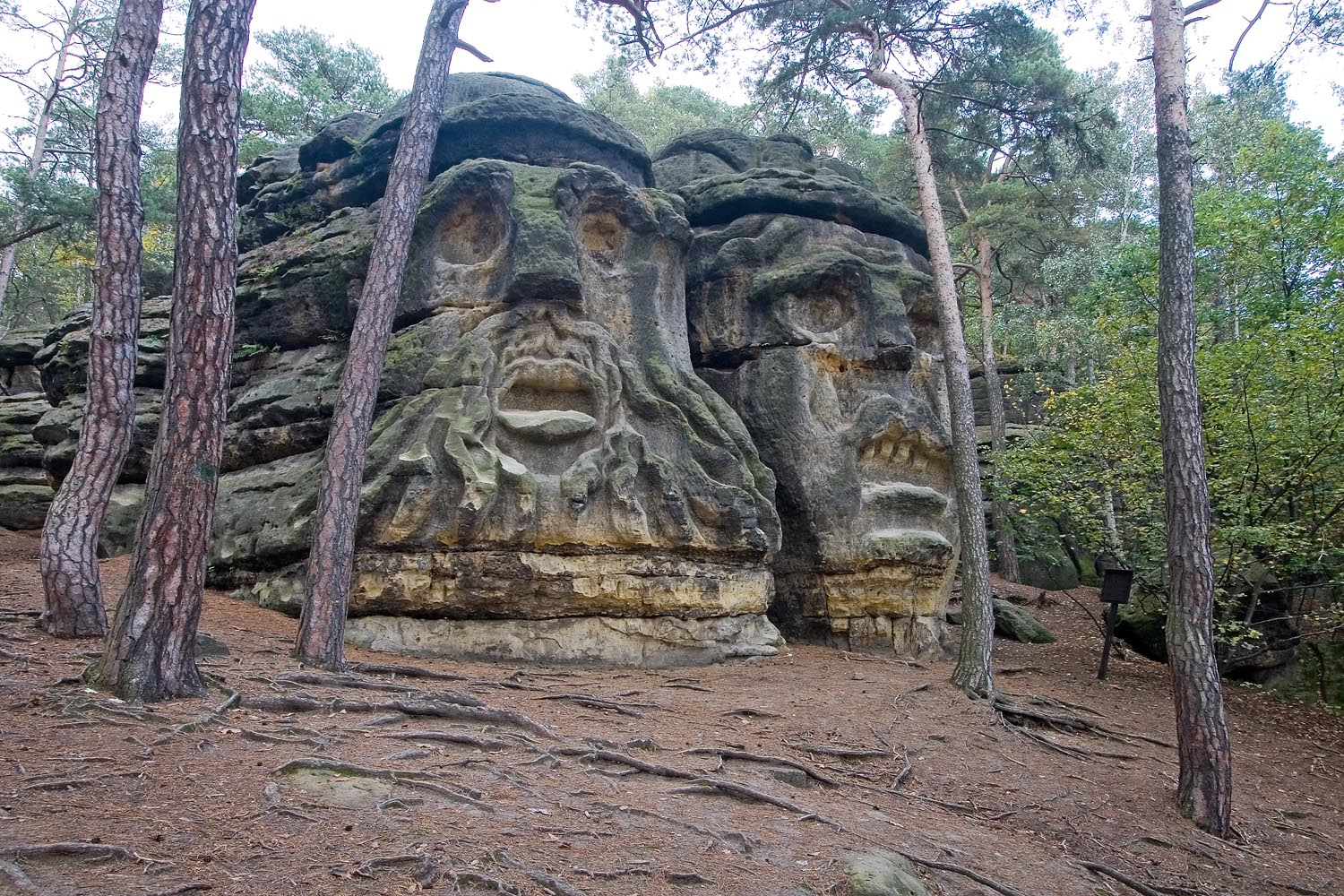
Čertovy hlavy, gigantic rock sculptures

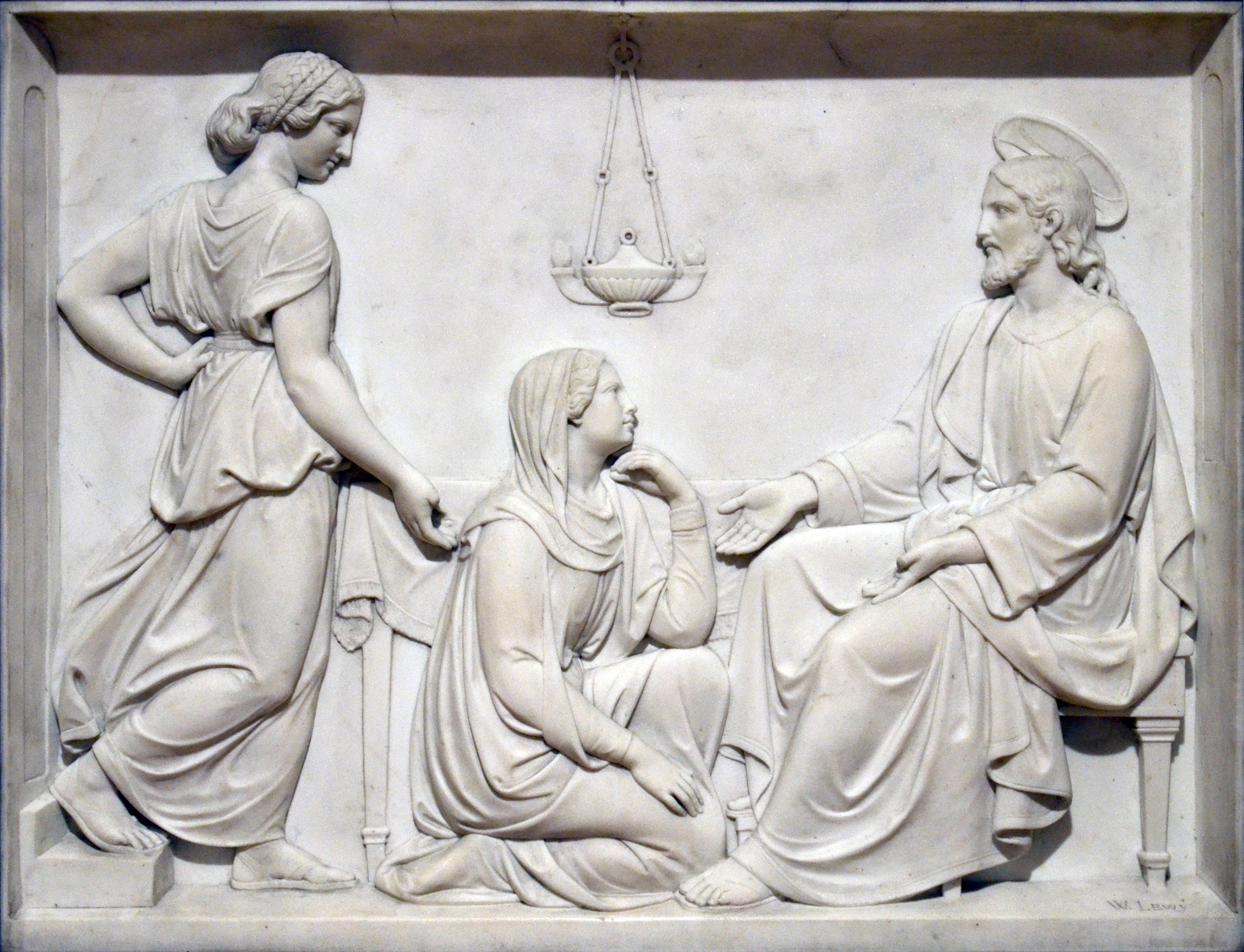
Christ with Mary and Martha, a marble relief (1858)

Veith fell into financial difficulties and died suddenly in 1853, but Levý was able to survive as a free-lance sculptor and soon received a commission from the Sisters of Mercy Hospital near Petřín Hill in Prague. Ultimately, however, he decided that he could not compete in the local sculpture market (which was dominated by the brothers Josef and Emanuel Max), so he applied for and received a stipendium to study in Rome. This proved to be his most fruitful period and his contacts there led to several large commissions in Vienna.

Because of health problems (believed to be liver disease), he returned to Bohemia in 1867. He was given contracts for decorating the tympanum at the Church of Saints Cyril and Methodius and sculptural adornments for St. Vitus Cathedral, but his worsening health gradually decreased his ability to work and he came to rely on his best student, Josef Václav Myslbek, whom he had met in Vienna. He died of his illness in Prague in 1870 and was buried at Vyšehrad Cemetery.

== Works ==
(incomplete list)

- 1846 – Čertovy hlavy ("Devil's Heads") in Želízy, near Klácelka
- 1858 – "Madona na půlměsíci" (Madonna on the Crescent Moon) and "Kristus s Pannou Marií a Martou" (Christ with Mary and Martha), National Gallery of Prague
- 1861 – Saint Elizabeth of Thuringia (in Carrara marble), now in the Kunsthistorisches Museum, Vienna
- 1864 – Saint James the Great and seven reliefs in the church at Polička
- 1866 – Saint Agnes of Bohemia, in the Votivkirche, Vienna
