= Loos =

Loos may refer to:

- Loos, Nord, a commune in France
- Loos-en-Gohelle, a commune in France
  - Loos Memorial, World War I memorial in the commune
- Loos, British Columbia, a locality in Canada
- Loos (surname), a Dutch and Low German surname
- Battle of Loos, 1915 battle on the Western Front of World War I

== See also ==
- Loo (disambiguation)
- Los (disambiguation)
- Lose (disambiguation)
- Van Gend & Loos, Dutch distribution company
- Ross–Loos Medical Group, Californian prepaid health service plan
