= Čertovy hlavy =

Sculpture by Václav Levý

Coordinates: 50°25′13.35″N 14°27′52.56″E

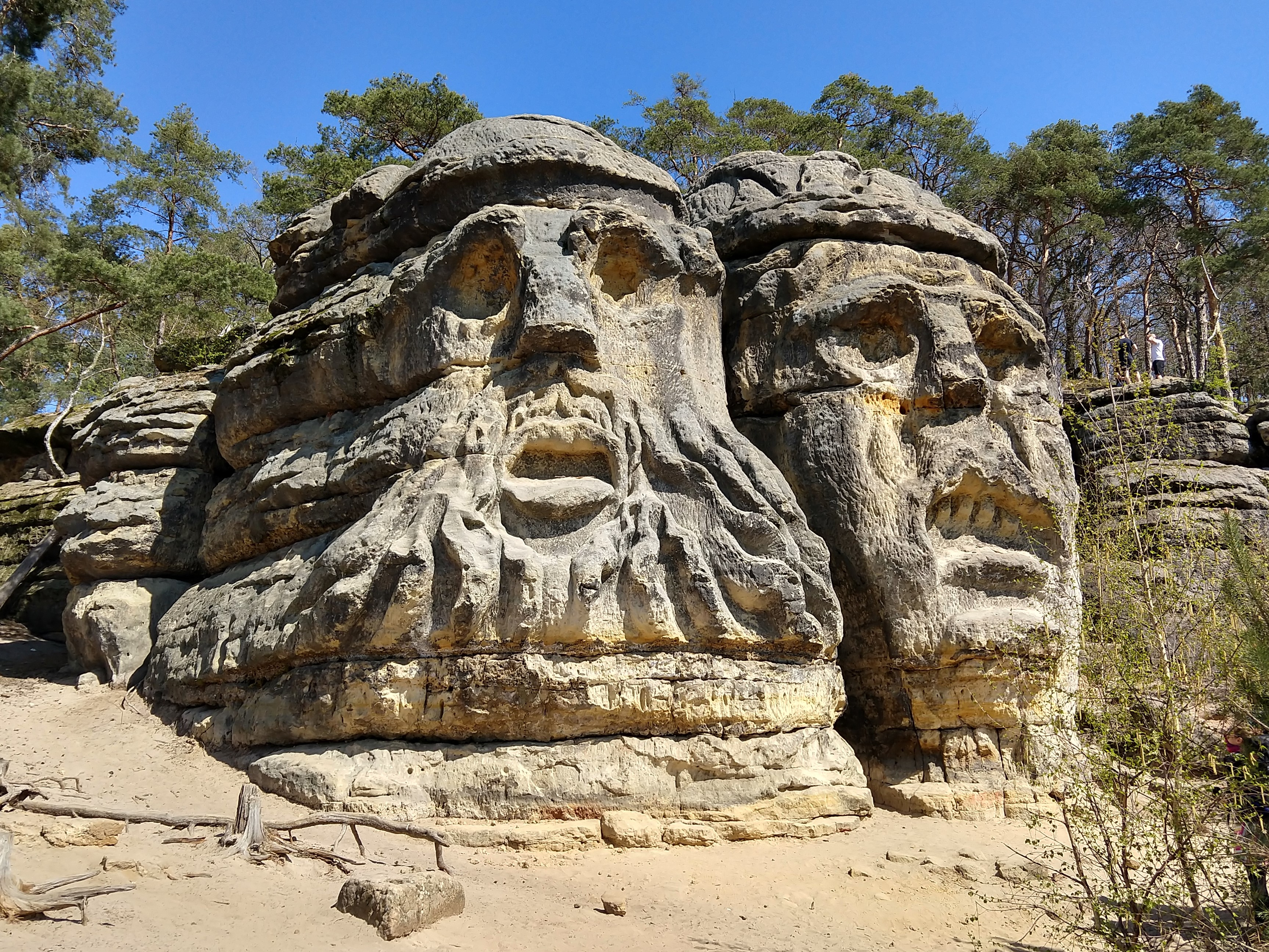
Detail of the sculptures

The Čertovy hlavy (English: The Devil Heads) are a pair of 9 metre high rock sculptures in the municipality of Želízy in the Central Bohemian Region of Czech Republic.

== History and description ==
Čertovy hlavy were created by Václav Levý in 1841–1846. In terms of dimensions, it is a unique work in the Czech Republic. They are the second largest carved heads in the world, after the carvings of Mount Rushmore in the United States.

The sculptures have been damaged by time and weather. In 2011, the private owner had the surrounding pine forest cut down, allowing the heads to be seen from the I/9 road. Further sandstone reliefs can be found near the Čertovy hlavy, known as Harfenice ('Harpist') and Had ('Snake') reliefs.

== Gallery ==
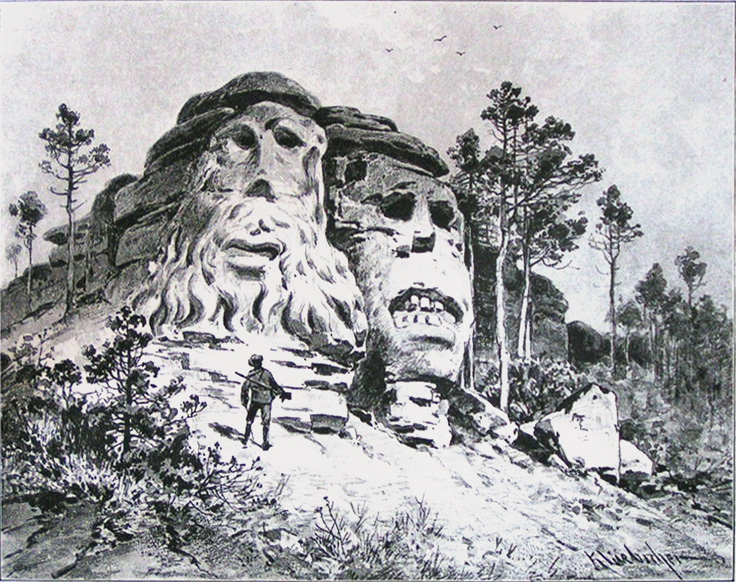
Illustration by Karel Liebscher

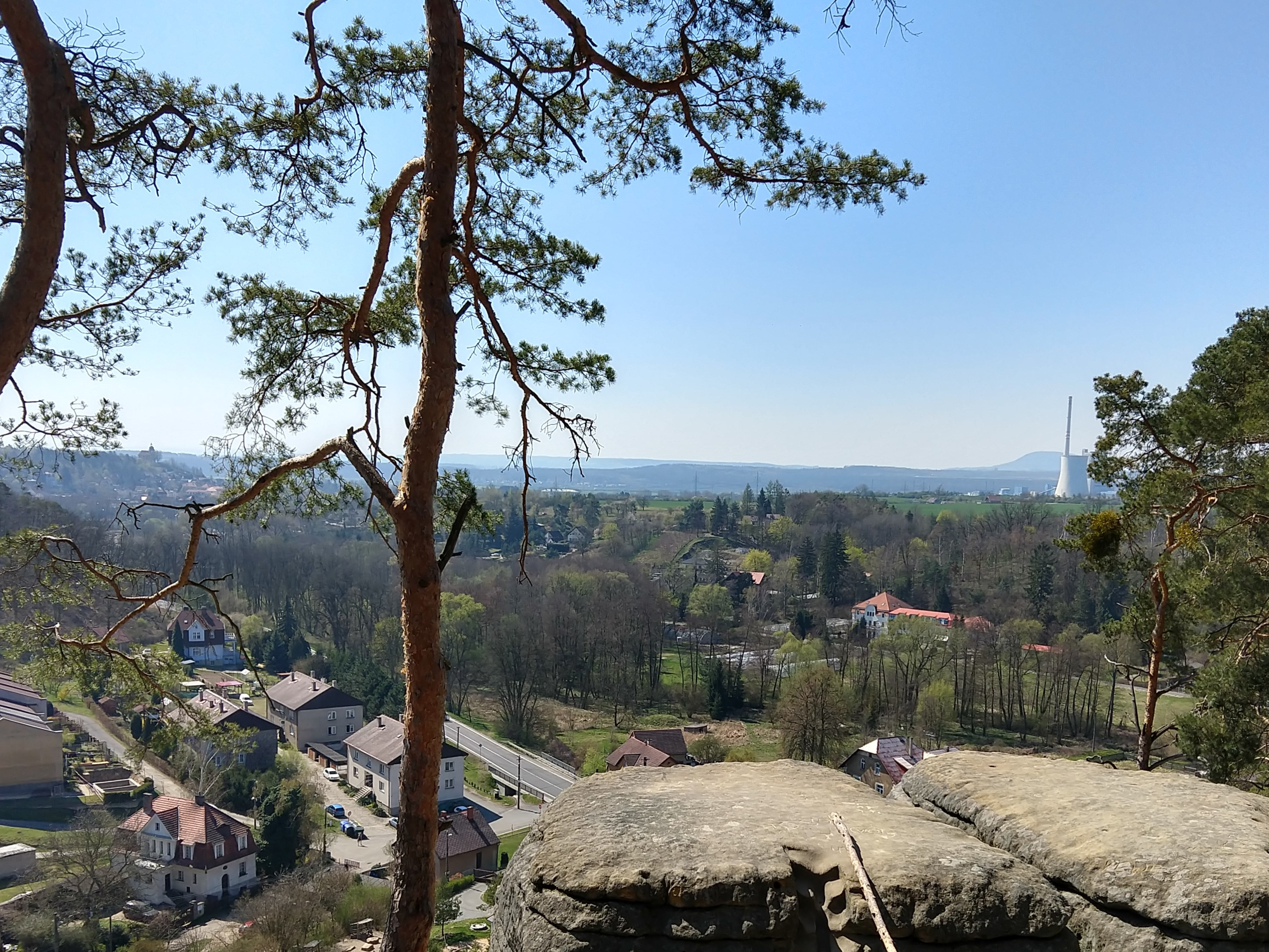
View from the top of Čertovy hlavy

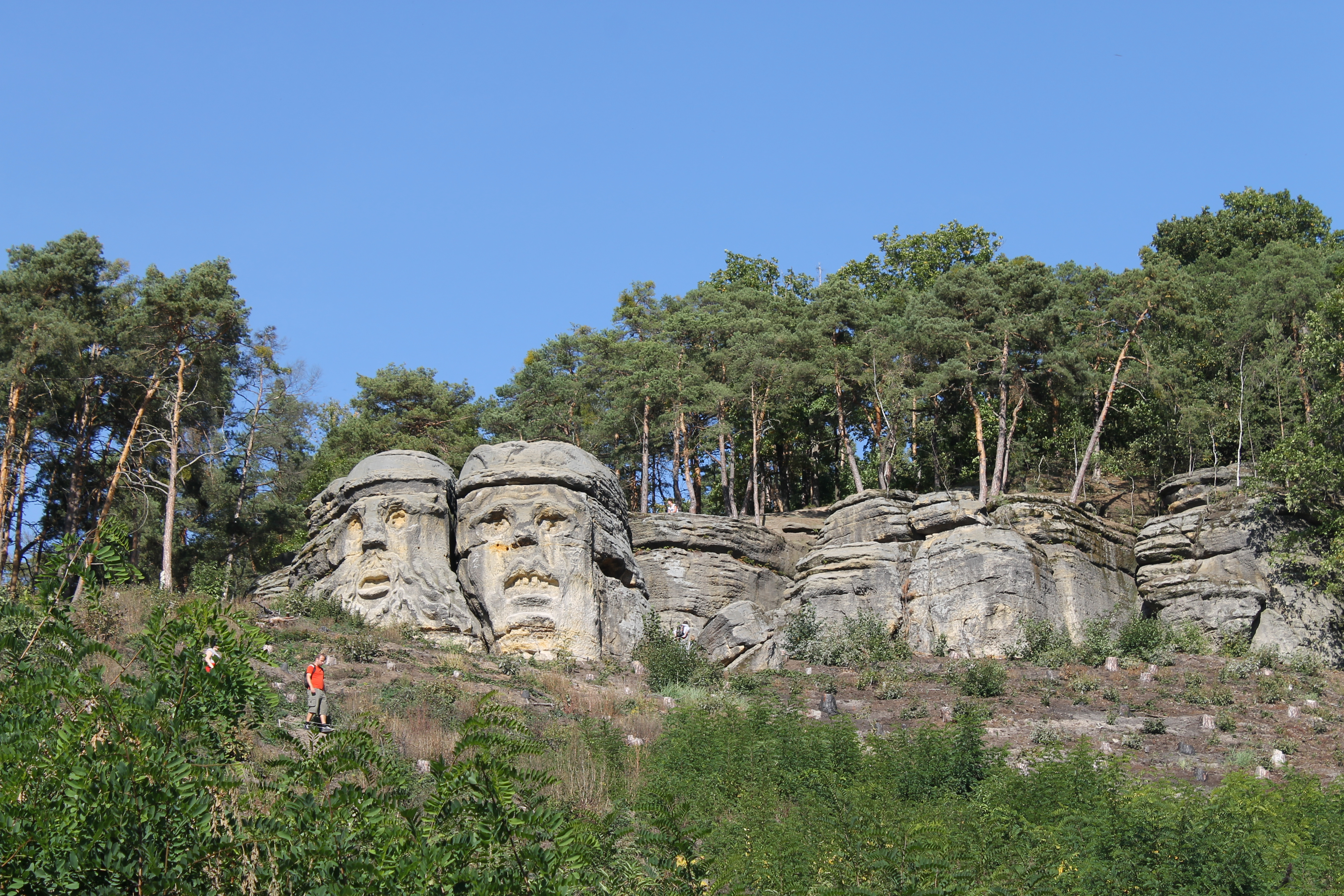
General view

== See also ==
- Klácelka, a man-made cave near Čertovy hlavy
- List of colossal sculptures in situ
