= František Klácel =

Czech author, philosopher, pedagogue, and journalist

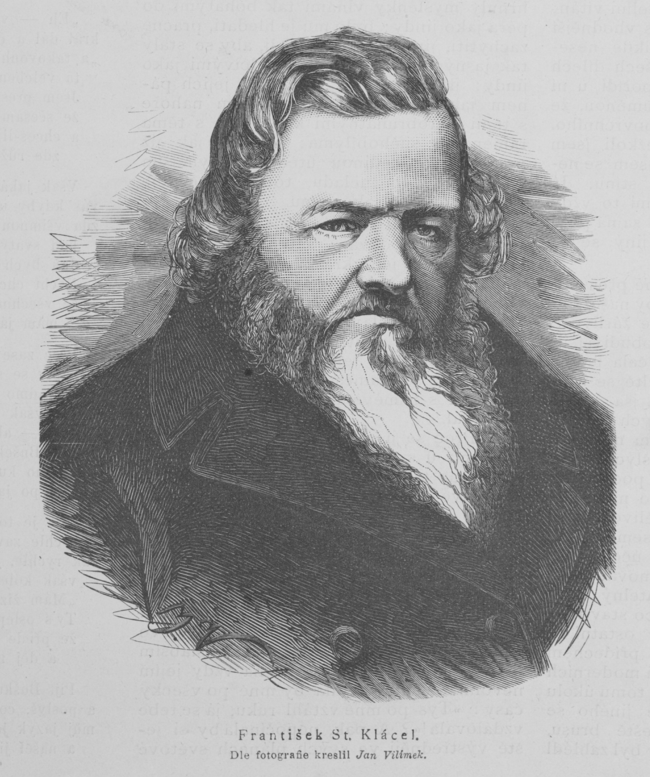
Portrait of Klácel by Jan Vilímek

František Matouš Klácel (8 April 1808 – 17 March 1882) was a Czech author, philosopher, pedagogue, and journalist. Since 1827 he was an Augustinian friar in Brno, co-brother of Gregor Mendel.

== Varied man ==
Klácel was born on 8 April 1808 in Česká Třebová, Bohemia. During his rich and varied life Klácel used several pseudonyms (František Třebovský, J. P. Jordan, and while he was abroad he used the name Ladimír K.) He also called himself Matouš František K.- Matouš had been his monastic name. He was born into a poor family, and his father was a cobbler. After basic school in Třebová and junior school he went to grammar school in Litomyšl and after graduating spent the next two years studying philosophy. In 1827 he went to the Augustinian monastery in Brno where he became a member of the order and spent the years 1829–1932 studying at the Brno theological institute. In 1833 he was ordained priest and after sitting three examinations at Olomouc university he was named professor of philosophy at the Brno theological institute in 1835. He enjoyed great authority amongst his students, and this was strengthened by his part in Czech cultural history and his poetic work.

=== Philosopher ===
As a philosopher Klácel was a follower of G. W. F. Hegel and he attempted to develop his ideas both in aesthetics and also towards the creation of a general theory of science and also on the problem of the patriotic movement, which he understood to be a precursor to humanitarianism and humanity (for example his essay Cosmopolitanism and patriotism with particular reference to Moravia). As well as his philosophical debuts he published in book form The beginnings of Czech scientific grammar – the first systematic Czech attempt to create a philosophical language. Because of his free thinking opinions and suspicion of panslavism Klácel was relieved of his professorship after nine years. After a short stay in Prague, where he worked as a librarian and became acquainted with patriotic groups, and following a short visit to Leipzig and Dresden he repaired to Liběchov on the invitation of his patron A. Veith. Here he managed the castle library, met with the Liběchov intellectual society, wrote poetry and together with the sculptor Václav Levý he took part in producing relief sculptures at the caves nearby (the so-called Klácelka). He returned to Brno in 1845 on the intervention of the church authorities, and together with J. Ohéral made efforts to establish the first Czech newspapers in the Moravian Weekly, which was first issued in January 1848, but Klácel was sent away from the German surroundings of Brno to Prague. There in the revolutionary year he took part in the activities of the National Committee, and was a member of the Slavonic Congress.

=== Back to the Moravian ===
After the overthrow of the Prague uprising he once more returned to Brno, after a short stay in Česká Třebová, to work on the Moravian Weekly once more. From November 1848 he was delegated by the Moravian Estates to publish the Moravian News, in which he included his Political Notes. Through these notes he addressed Ludmila (also Luděnka, which were pseudonyms of Božena Němcová) as a friend to a friend on the origins of socialism and communism, and enlightened information on the French utopian socialism. In 1850 he added a further cycle – Světozor (Morning Star), this time dedicated to general questions on nature. Klácel became involved with (and gave information in the Moravian News) club activities (National Union of St. Cyril and Methodius), and the Bohemian-Moravian Brotherhood (Jan Ivan Helcelet, Hynek Hanuš, Božena Němcová and her husband) was supposed to become a basis for the materialisation of his ideas of humanitarianism, but his aims foundered, and this affected Klácel's friendship with Němcová.

=== Natural Sciences and American Equality ===
Klácel gradually moved away from patriotic societies, and began to publish less often. He became interested in natural sciences (he had been in charge of an experimental garden in the monastery) and undertook private teaching. His relationship with the new head of the monastery J. G. Mendel was not a harmonious one, and came to a head with allusions to compromising intimate relations, and this all supported his long-held dream to go the United States, whose social arrangement was regarded by him to be the realisation of his ideas on free life in equality. In summer 1869 he departed. In Iowa City he published the journal Slovan amerikánský (American Slav), became involved with the free-thinker movement, and for the new Union of Free Thinkers he published the newssheet Hlas (Voice, 1872). He moved to Chicago with this journal, where he established another title – Svojan (Own Man).

Although Klácel industriously translated, published and wrote a number of popular scientific handbooks, American reality did not meet with his imaginations and he fell into serious financial difficulties. Charitable events were organised in his support both in the US and in the Czech lands, but these did not have a long-term effect. Before his death, Klácel wrote a testament, which summed up his teachings. He died on 17 March 1882 in Belle Plaine, Iowa. He was buried in Belle Plaine, and at the Czech cemetery a monument was unveiled in his honour by his countrymen.

=== Poet ===
Klácel's poetic beginnings (Lyrical Poems, 1836 and Poems, 1837) were inspired by the ancient world. The patriot and free thinker Klácel expressed himself in full in the collection Berries from Slavonic Forests (1845). In his version of Goethe's epos Reynard the Fox (1845) and the anthology Bájky Bidpájovy (1846 and 1850) he used animal allegories in order to critically portray contemporary society. Klácel was also the author of the first Czech dictionary of foreign words (Dictionary for readers of journals, 1849) and numerous terminological dictionaries and encyclopedias, of which the majority were published in journals published by him or remained in hand-written form.

== Legacy ==
Klácel, an Augustinian friar, teacher, writer, and natural science researcher, was a leading figure of the Czech National Revival in Moravia and an active participant in the Revolutions of 1848. He is commemorated in Brno, where a street in the Masaryk Quarter bears his name, and since 1978 a memorial stone with his portrait by Milada Orthová has been installed at Mendlovo Square.

== Works ==
- Ferina lišák – a fable about a fox
- Bajky Bidpajovy – two volumes, the first published under the pen name František Třebovský
- Jahůdky ze slovanských lesů – published under the pen name J. P. Jordan
- Erklärungen der wichtigeren philosophischen Ausdrücke
- Počátky vědecké mluvnictví českého
- Dobrověda
- Slovník pro čtenáře novin, v němž se vysvětlují slova cizího původu
- Listy přítele k přítelkyni o původu socialismu a komunismu – letters to Božena Němcová in which he explains his opinions about the ideal society.

== See also ==
- Klácelka, manmade cave named in his honor
