= LDOS =

LDOS may refer to:

- Local density of states, a physical quantity
- The ICAO code for Osijek Airport in Osijek, Croatia
- Lord's Day Observance Society
- The disk operating system for the TRS-80 that later replaced TRSDOS

== See also ==
- DOS (disambiguation)
- LOS (disambiguation)
