= Klácelka =

Coordinates: 50°24′58.9″N 14°27′43.9″E

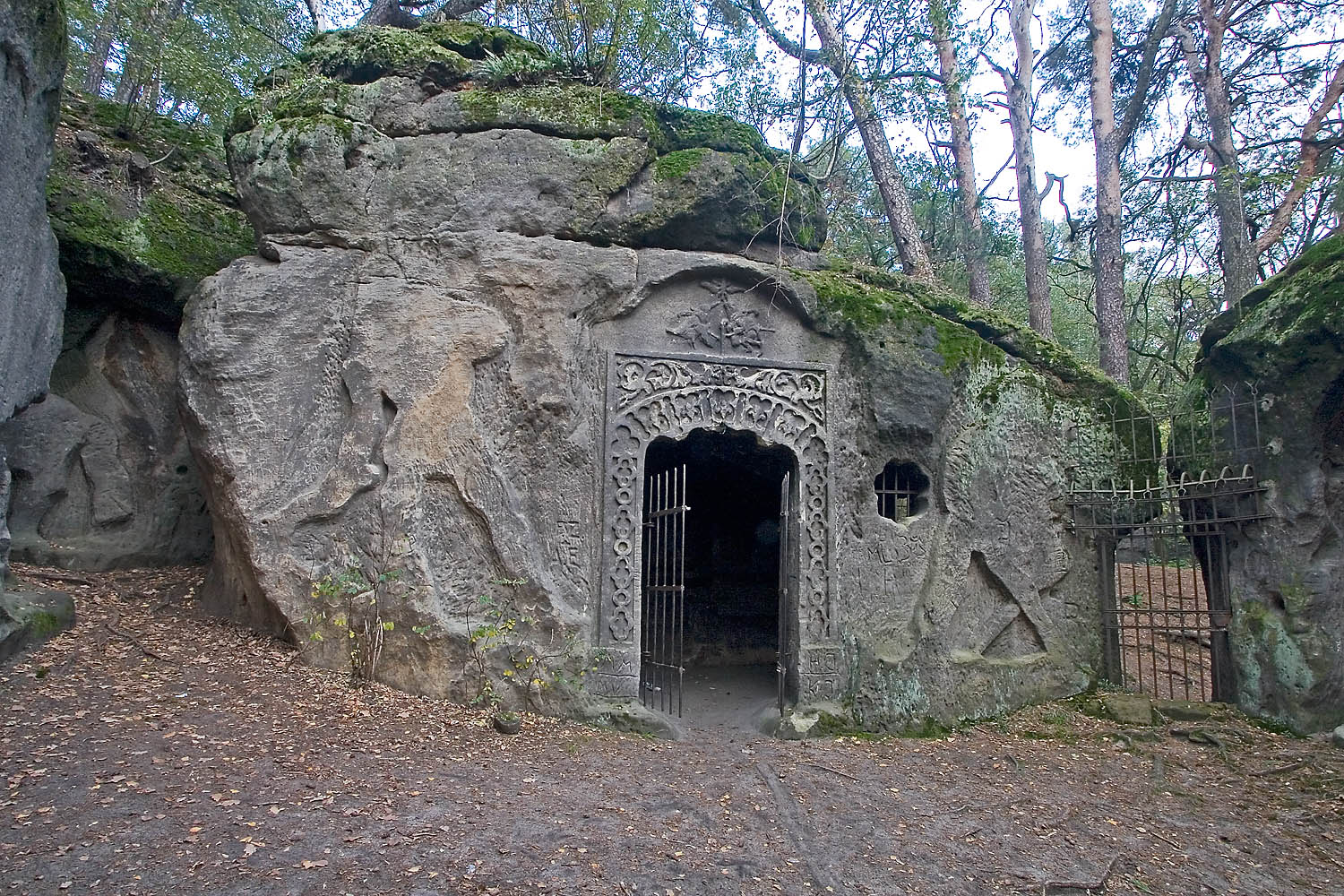
Decorated entrance to the Klácelka cave

Klácelka is a man-made cave in a forest near Liběchov, Czech Republic. It is known for its complex of sculptural works made by sculptor Václav Levý. The name of the cave and the sculptures commemorate František Klácel, a theologian and philosopher. It was created during the 1840s.

At the time of carving the Klácelka, Levý was an untutored young man. He chiseled from sandstone rock a cave that is an allegorical Blaník - a hall of sleeping heroes. These include the leader of the soldiers of the mythological army Zdeněk Zásmucký, the Hussite leaders Jan Žižka and Prokop Holý, the sleeping Blaník army, and the dwarf figures wielding weapons for them. The interior walls of the cave are festooned with reliefs from the fable Lišák Ferina by Klácel.

The theme of Blaník, central to the Klácelka, harks back to Protestant symbolism and the memory of the Hussite Wars, notwithstanding the Catholic monarchy of the times.

Klácelka is freely accessible along the blue tourist trail leading along the circuit from Liběchov via Želízy and Tupadly around another work by Václav Levý, the Devil's Head above Želízy. 2.5 km northwest of Želízy are also the reliefs of Harpist and Snake.

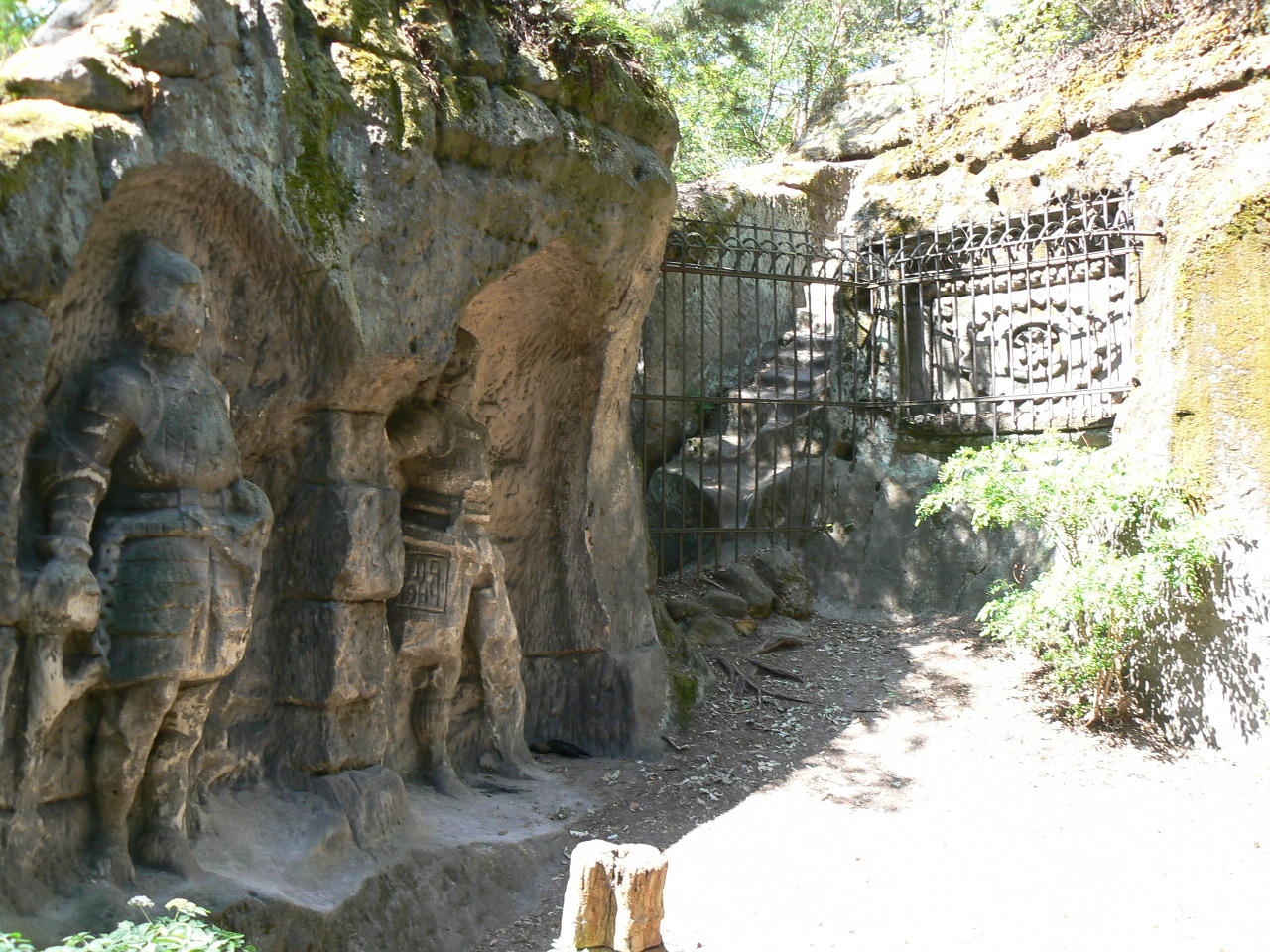
Jan Žižka and Prokop Holý

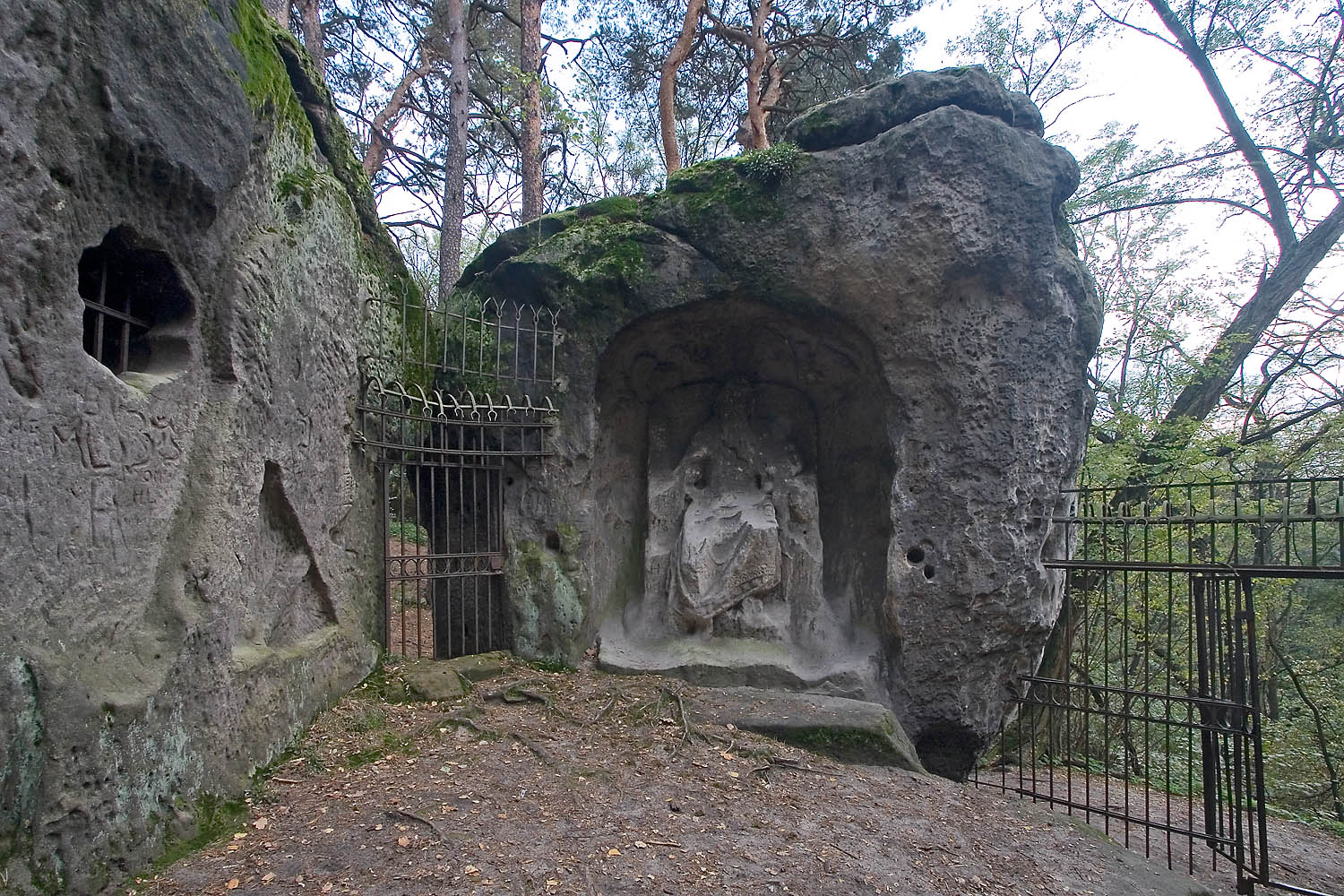
Zdeněk Zásmucký

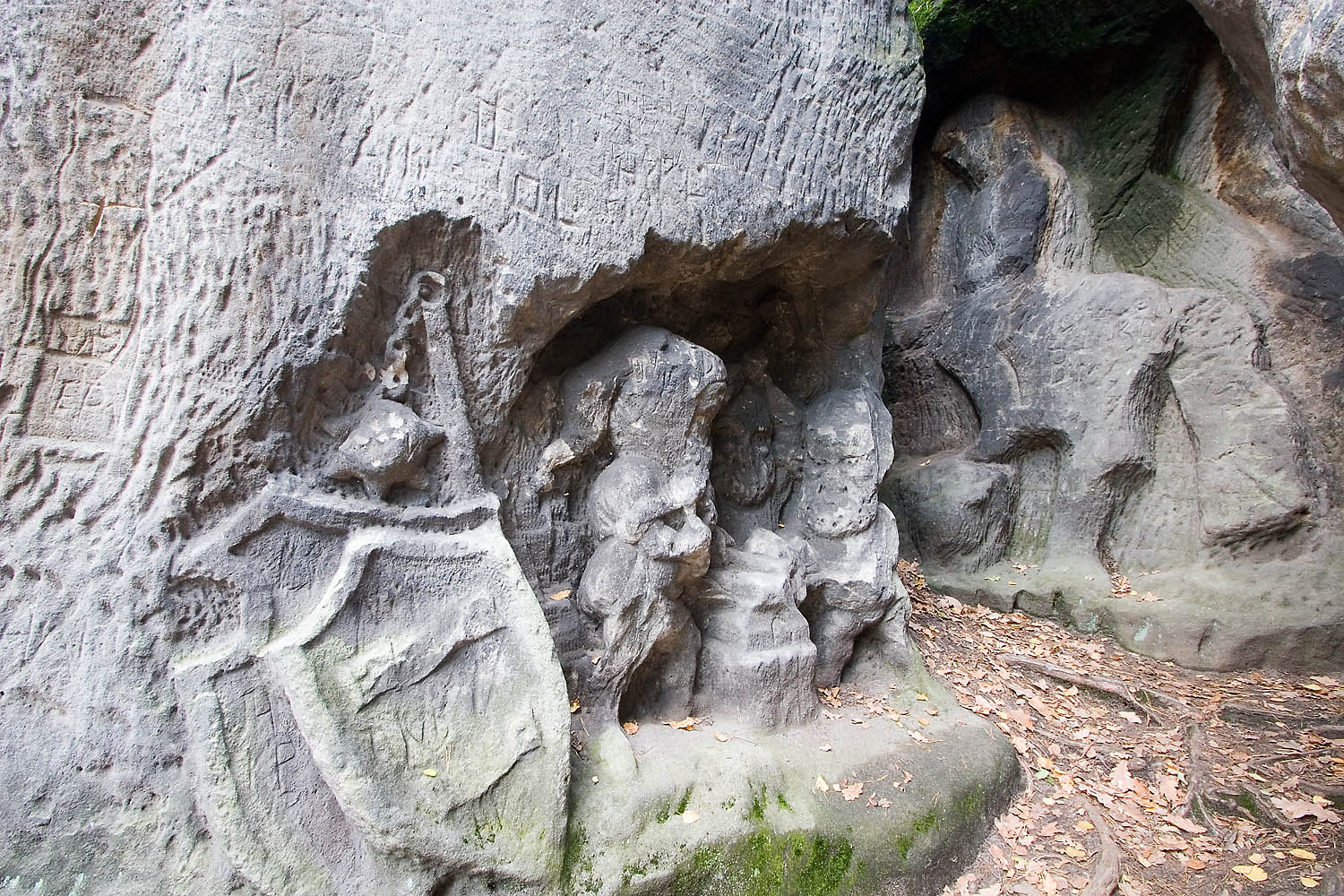
The dwarves forge weapons

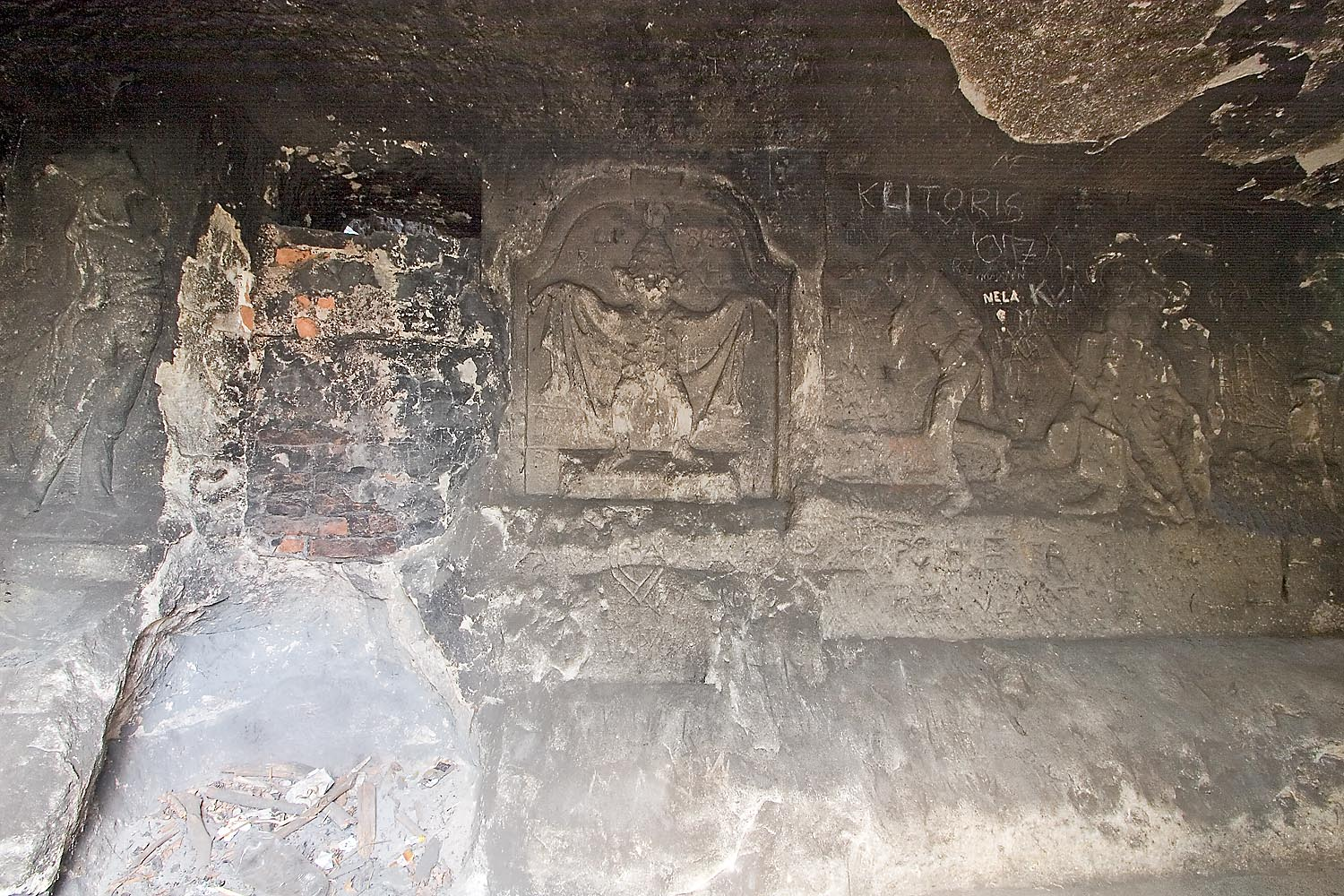
The bat from Klácel's fable
