= Kurt Loos =

German Ornithologist

Kurt Camillo Loos
- Born: 25 January 1859; Brunndöbra, Klingenthal
- Died: 27 July 1933 (aged 74); Mendoza, Argentina
- Occupations: Forester, Ornithologist
- Known for: Bird-ringing in Bohemia, founding Lotos Natural Science Society

Kurt Camillo Loos (25 January 1859 – 27 July 1933) was a German forester and ornithologist active in Bohemia. Loos was a founder of bird-ringing in Bohemia and was involved in founding a ringing station and a scientific organization in Prague called Lotos which also produced a periodical of the same name.

== Biography ==
Loos was born in Brunndöbra, Klingenthal, the son of Karl Friedrich Moritz Loos who was a teacher at the church school. When the family moved to Arnoldsgrün and he went to the secondary school at Plauen where he was a contemporary of Franz Helm with whom he spent time outdoors. His brother P. A. Loos later became German Vice consul in Argentina. He then studied natural sciences at the Leipzig University and worked as a forest officer in the Karlsfeld district. He trained at the Tharandt Forest Academy after which he worked at Königstein and then Schlenau, Bohemia, from 1881 to 1898. The Liběchov district was then put under his charge and he established a ringing station on the Elbe river and founded the Lotos Natural Science Society in Prague who published a periodical called Lotos which ran from 1914 to 1931. He also observed individual pairs of birds over a long duration and produced a monograph on the life of the black woodpecker in 1910 and on the eagle owl in Bohemia (1906). He retired in 1926 and lived in Liběchov. He died in Mendoza, Argentina where he was visiting his brother who was the German Vice consul. He was buried in Liběchov.
