= LOS AS =

Norwegian electricity supplier

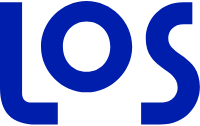
- Type: Subsidiary
- Industry: Electricity retailing
- Founded: 2001; 25 years ago
- Defunct: 1 May 2023
- Fate: Merger
- Successor: Å Strøm
- Headquarters: Kristiansand, Norway
- Revenue: NOK 3.1 billion (2016)
- Number of employees: 110
- Parent: Agder Energi
- Website: los.no at the Wayback Machine

LOS AS was a Norwegian electricity retailer based in Kristiansand. The company was owned by Agder Energi and was the country's third-largest retailer to the household market.

LOS was established in 2001 as spinn-off of the retailing division of Agder Energi. In addition to a head office in Kristiansand, it had regional offices in Arendal and at Lysaker. The parent company merged with Glitre Energi in 2022, to create Å Energi. As a consequence, LOS merged with Glitre's retailing subsidiary Glitre Energi Strøm to form Å Strøm.
