= Josef Matěj Navrátil =

Czech painter (1798–1865)

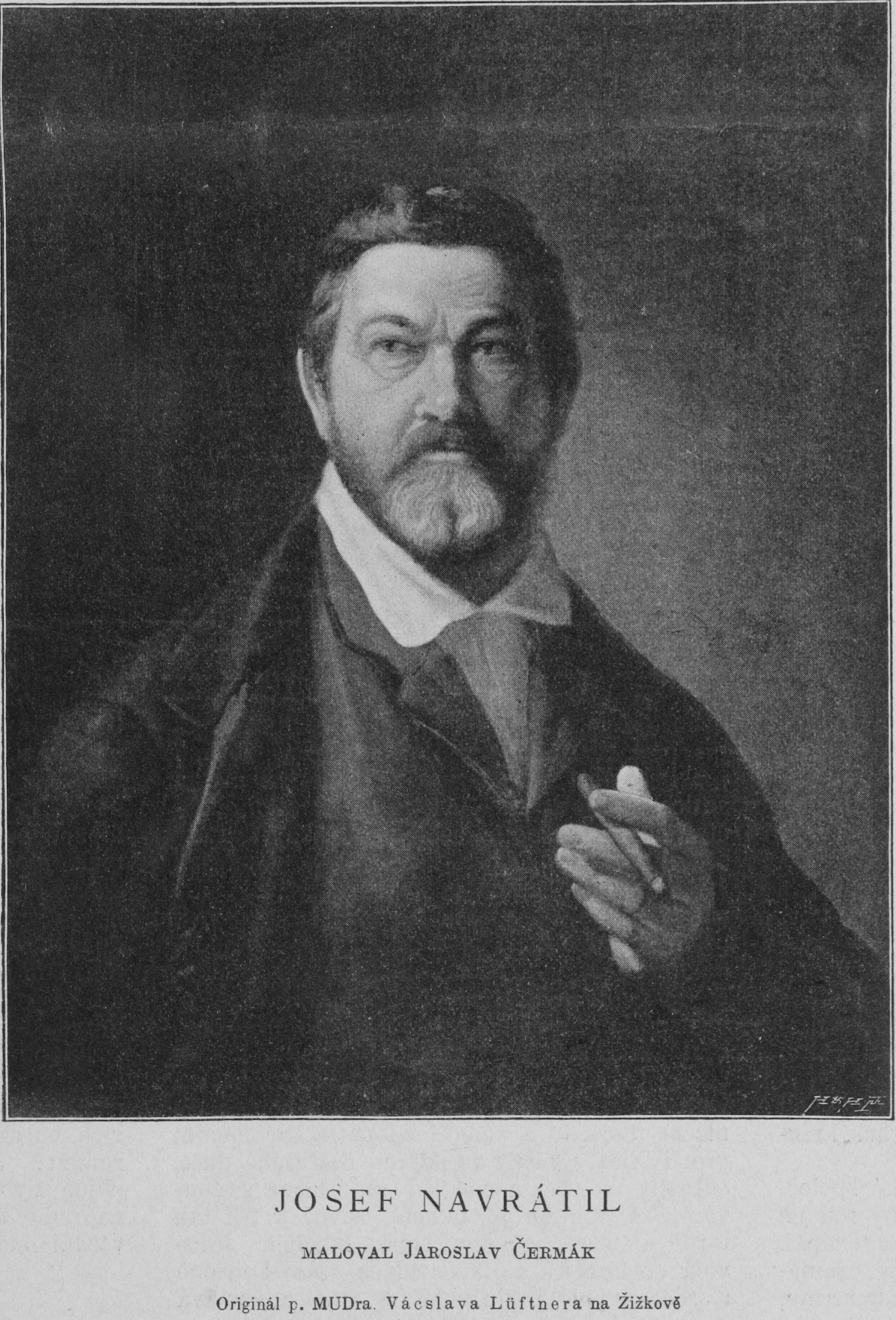
Portrait of Josef Matěj Navrátil by Jaroslav Čermák

Josef Matěj Navrátil (17 February 1798 – 21 April 1865) was a Czech painter.

== Early life ==
Born in Slaný, Navrátil was trained by his father as a decorator, and after further study at the Academy of Fine Arts, Prague became a painter-decorator. He also took numerous trips abroad, particularly to Switzerland.

== Career ==
His wall paintings from this early period still decorate different objects in Prague (including Prague Castle), the Postal Museum in Liběchov, Ploskovice, Jirny (with its famous Alpine room) and elsewhere. On the imperial castle in Zákupy when editing as the future seat of the emperor in the years 1850 - 1853 with the help of assistants decorated the 20 rooms historical and genre paintings, ornaments, and allegorical works.

His fame grew, and in 1850 he became president of the Union of Artists. Eleven years later, he had to leave because partially paralyzed as a result of a stroke. He lived in poverty.

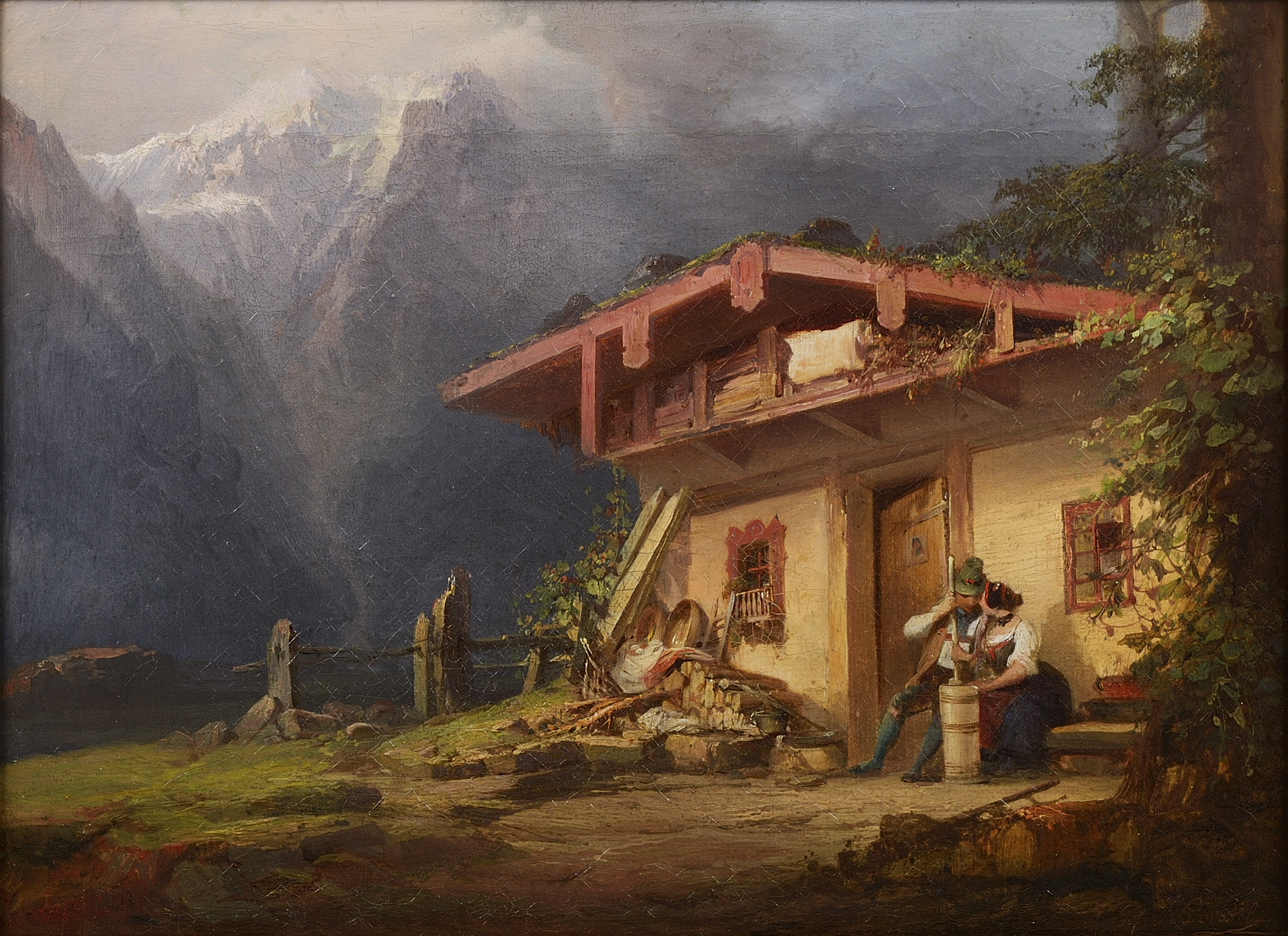
Alpine Landscape with Figures (c.1850)

== Legacy ==
The first comprehensive exhibition of his work took place posthumously in 1909 in the Rudolfinum. In 1952, he had a street named after him near Charles Square in Prague.

He inspired photographer Josef Sudek, which influence appears in the fifties with his still life paintings that reproduce not only for printing, but also for himself. He let them affect the recording of Cologne landscape after World War II created a series of still life by Navrátil in 1954.

The art of painter Navrátil has been depicted on at least one postage stamp of Czechoslovakia. On 19 August 1988 Czechoslovakia issued a five koruna stamp depicting the painting "Turin, Monte Superga," located at the Prague Postal Museum. The Scott catalog number for this stamp is 2715. The five koruna stamp was issued with two identical postage stamps in a miniature souvenir sheet issued in commemoration of the PRAGA88 International Stamp Exhibition.

== Style ==
Navrátil was superb landscape painter, but most of his work focussed on still lifes and figurative paintings and sketches. In his paintings there is a mixing of various styles of sketches, which gets to the point of impressionism.
