= Loo (surname) =

Family name

Loo (written 盧/卢 as a Han character) may refer to these people:

== Painting ==
- Charles-Amédée-Philippe van Loo (1719–1795), French painter of allegorical scenes and portraits
- Charles-André van Loo (1705–1765), French subject painter
- Jean-Baptiste van Loo (1684–1745), French subject and portrait painter
- Louis-Michel van Loo (1707–1771), French painter

== Sport ==
- Alexa Loo (born 1972), Canadian snowboarder
- Katrin Loo (born 1991), Estonian footballer
- Loo Hor-Kuay (1934–2009), Taiwanese Olympic basketball player
- Martin Loo (born 1988), Estonian cross-country mountain biker
- Rudolf Loo (1902–1983), Estonian amateur wrestler

== Other ==
- Ellen Joyce Loo (1986–2018), member of the Hong Kong musical group at17
- Raine Loo (1945–2020), Estonian actress
- Richard Loo (1903–1982), Chinese American film actor
