= Hofje van Loo =

Hofje in Haarlem, Netherlands

Coordinates: 52°22′48″N 4°37′49″E

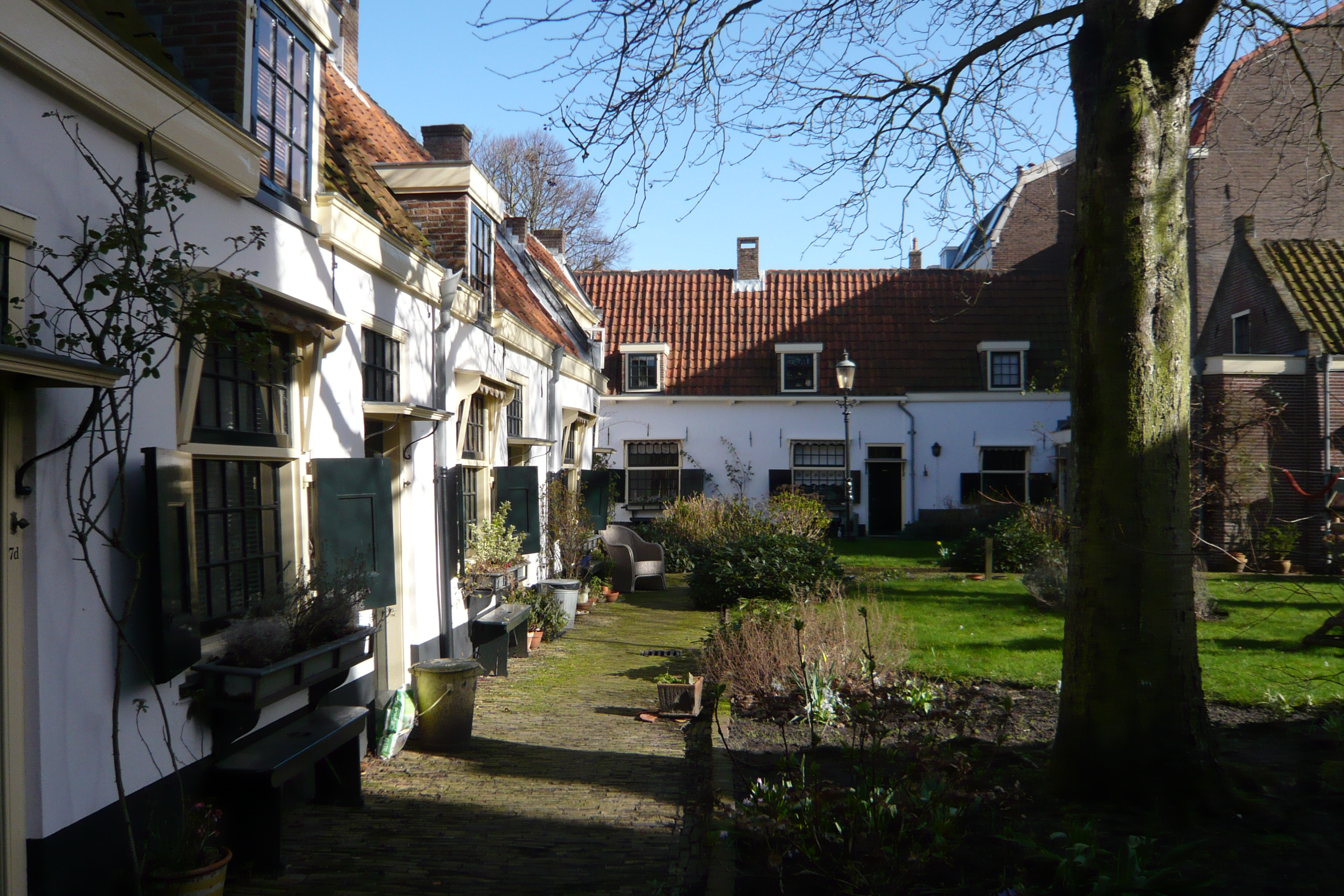
The Hofje van Loo on the Barrevoetstraat, was founded with money from the legacy of Symon Pietersz van Loo. In the background looms the modern housing of the Haarlem library

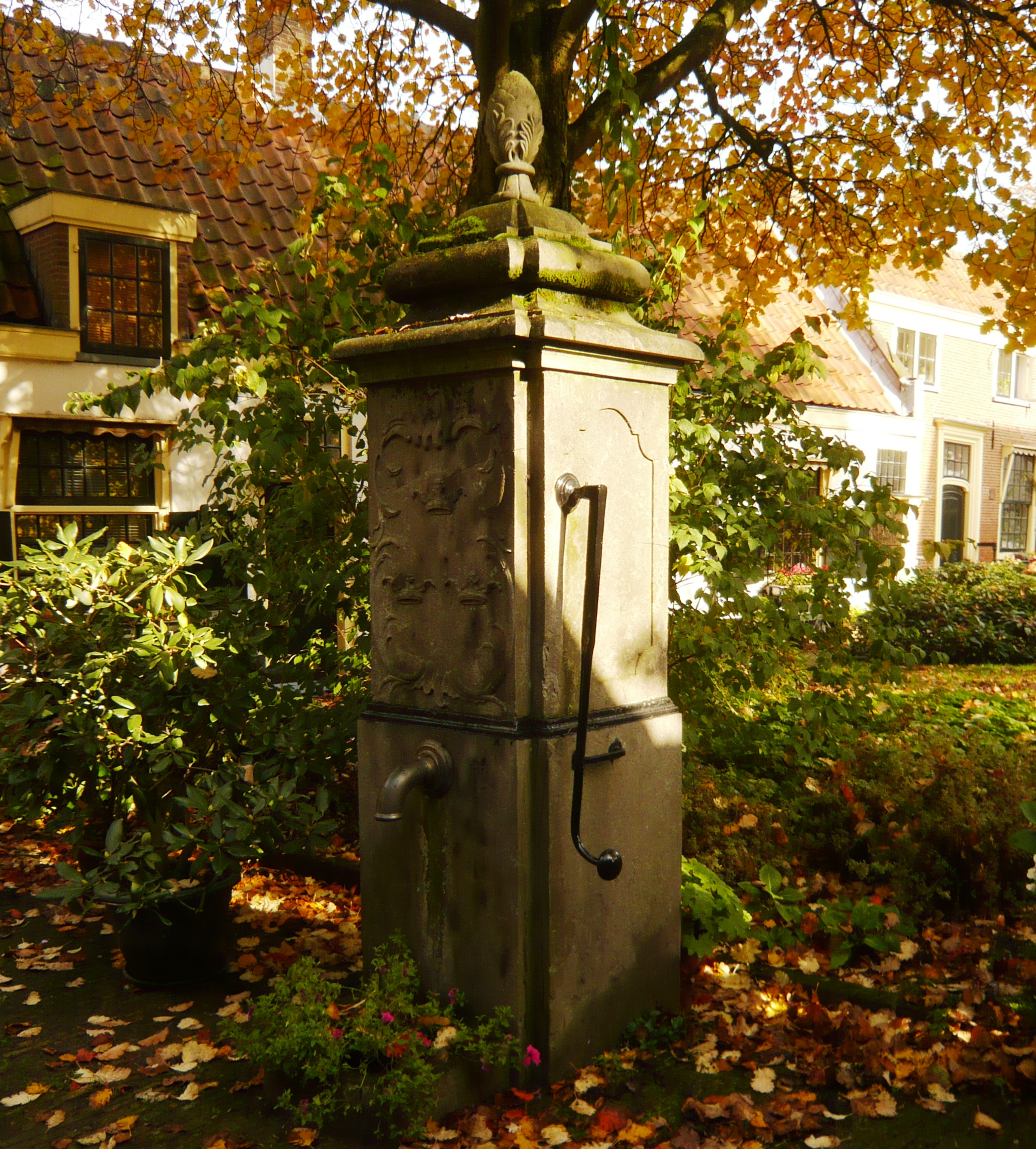
Pump in the garden that is decorated with a Baroque heraldic shield showing the three crowns that signify the St. Elisabeth of Groote Gasthuis.

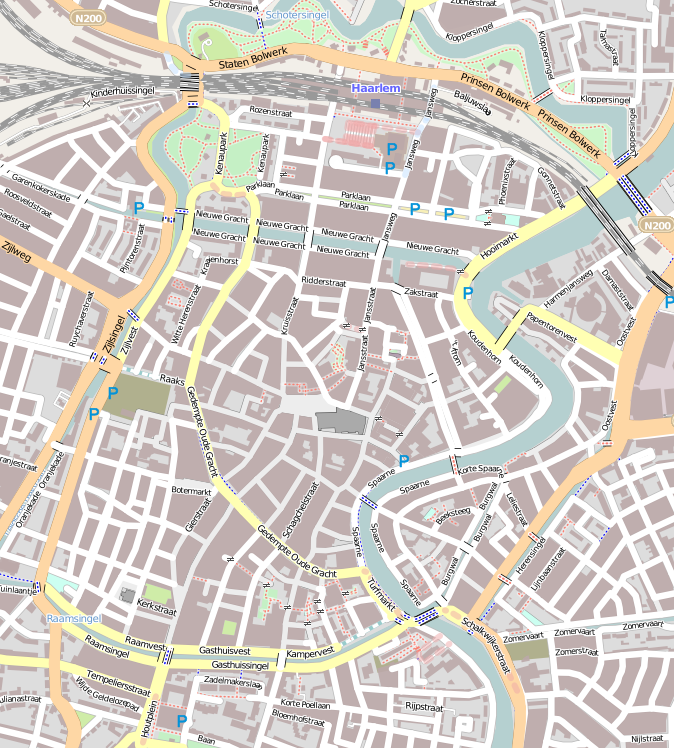
The Hofje van Loo is on the northern side of the street, and the Wijnbergshofje is on the southern side.

The Hofje van Loo is a hofje on the Barrevoetstraat 7 in Haarlem, Netherlands.

It was founded in 1489 by Haarlem mayor Symon Pieterszoon van Loo and his wife Godelt Willemsdochter, on the Grebbesteeg 'purely to honor and rest the souls of their parents and themselves' by funding 13 rooms with gardens to be administered by the 'gasthuismeesters' of the St. Elisabeth Gasthuis nearby.

There were many conditions attached to this deal, among them the stipulation that the rooms remain on the Grebbesteeg behind the van Loo house, which was on the Barrevoetsteeg. The gasthuismeesters should give each member each week one stuiver (5 cents), one or two baskets of turf (used instead of firewood for cooking and heating). Aside from this, a parcel of land in Castricum was donated to be used for income, and the rooms, land, and rent, should all be administered separately. Despite this last stipulation, the land in Castricum was sold in 1633, and in 1683 the books were merged with the St. Elisabeth Gasthuis.

The original houses in the hofje are gone, replaced in the 17th century, and renovated in the 18th. In 1843 the regents room (which was never used) was renovated and split into two houses, so that 15 members could be housed in total. In 1884 the hofje almost disappeared altogether, when the Barrevoetsteeg was widened to become the Barrevoetstraat. One whole side of the hofje needed to be demolished, and therefore plans were made to move the entire hofje elsewhere. In 1885 the Haarlem council decided to move only the Oud-Alkemade hofje which was also located on the Barrevoetsteeg, and only tear down the three houses on the street side of the van Loo hofje. Three new houses were built further back from the street (these are the two buildings to the left and right of the gate), and the old regents room was declared the gatekeepers cottage, bringing the total number of rooms to 14.

The role of the gatekeeper as recorded by the St. Elisabeth's regents in 1835 had a yearly salary of 11 guilders and her duties were to open and close the gate, turn the streetlight on and off, clean the privy, and send for medicine for sick members. Today one of the members is appointed as general contact for the regents.

This hofje is the most visible from the street of all the hofjes in Haarlem. The front-row of three houses was demolished in 1880 when the street in front of it, the Barrevoetesteeg, was widened. So instead of the typical U-shape of houses around a garden, one side of the hofje is now located at the street, separated only by a fence.

Address: Barrevoetestraat 7
