= Tupadly (Mělník District) =

- Municipality
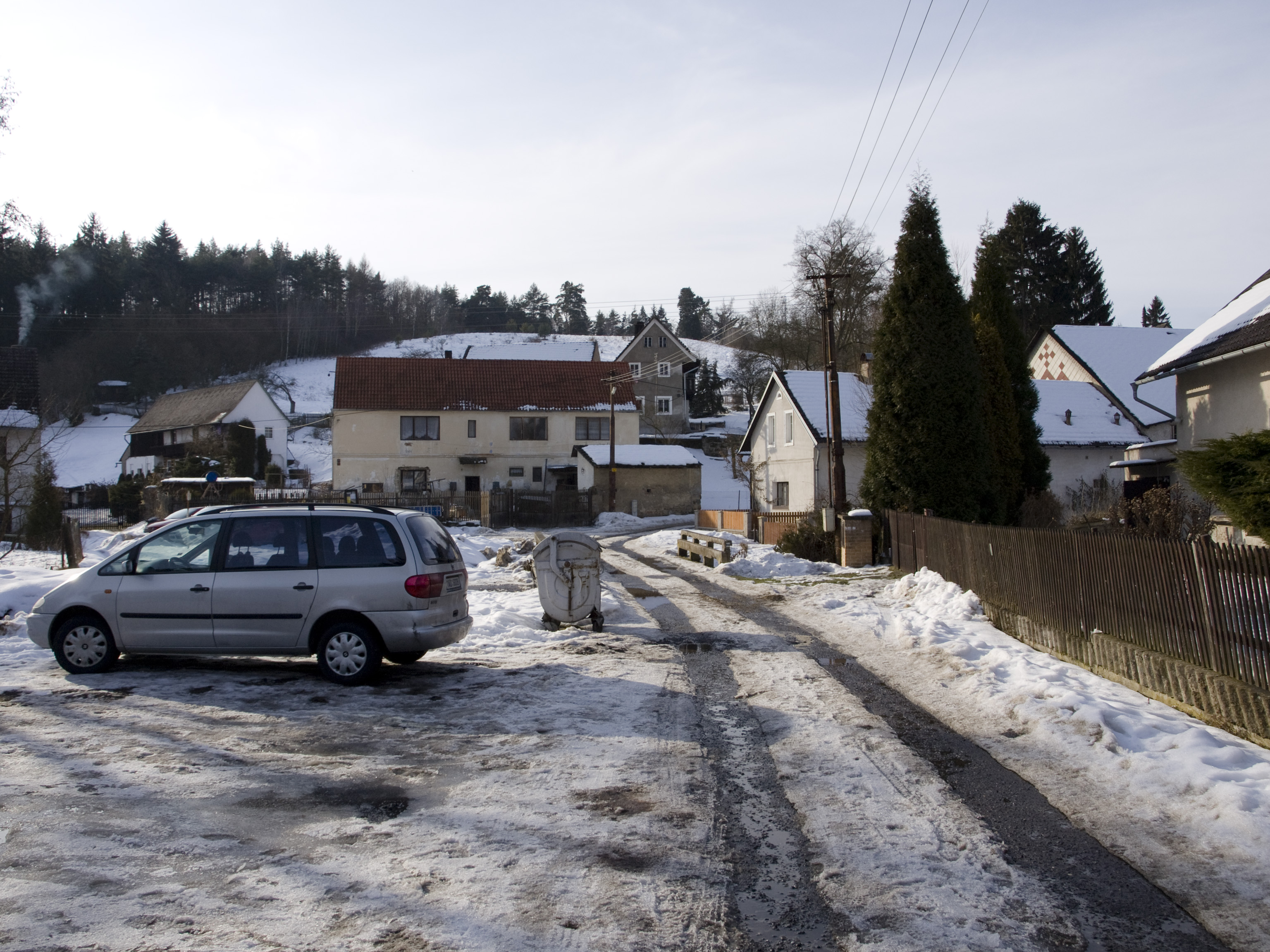
- Centre of Tupadly

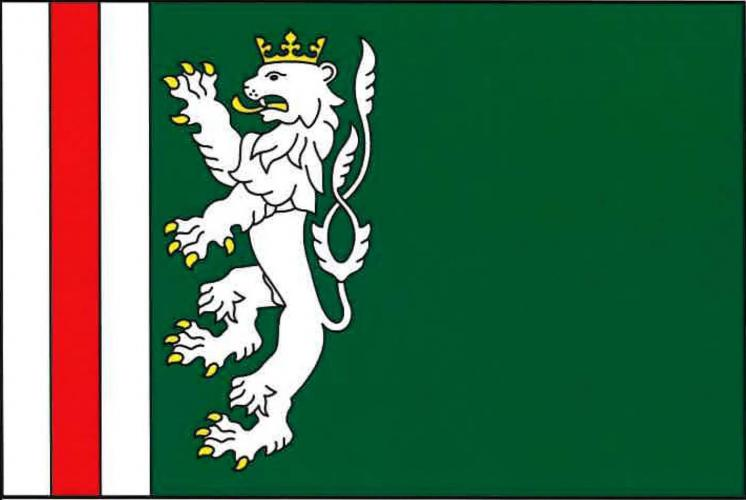
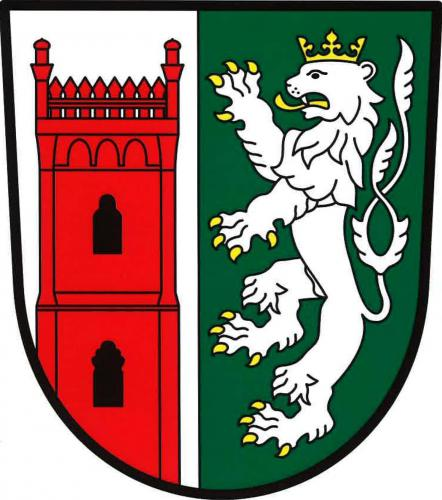
- Flag Coat of arms

- Location in the Czech Republic
- Coordinates: 50°26′31″N 14°28′30″E
- Country: Czech Republic
- Region: Central Bohemian
- District: Mělník
- First mentioned: 1542

Area
  - Total: 6.37 km^{2} (2.46 sq mi)
- Elevation: 185 m (607 ft)

Population (2026-01-01)
  - Total: 157
  - Density: 24.6/km^{2} (63.8/sq mi)
- Time zone: UTC+1 (CET)
  - Summer (DST): UTC+2 (CEST)
- Postal code: 277 21
- Website: www.obec-tupadly.cz

Tupadly is a municipality and village in Mělník District in the Central Bohemian Region of the Czech Republic. It has about 200 inhabitants.

== Demographics ==
Historical population
Year	Pop.	±%
1869	455	—
1880	409	−10.1%
1890	364	−11.0%
1900	352	−3.3%
1910	379	+7.7%
1921	337	−11.1%
1930	342	+1.5%
1950	212	−38.0%
1961	263	+24.1%
1970	213	−19.0%
1980	120	−43.7%
1991	98	−18.3%
2001	117	+19.4%
2011	128	+9.4%
2021	136	+6.2%
Source: Censuses
