= Liběchov =

- Town
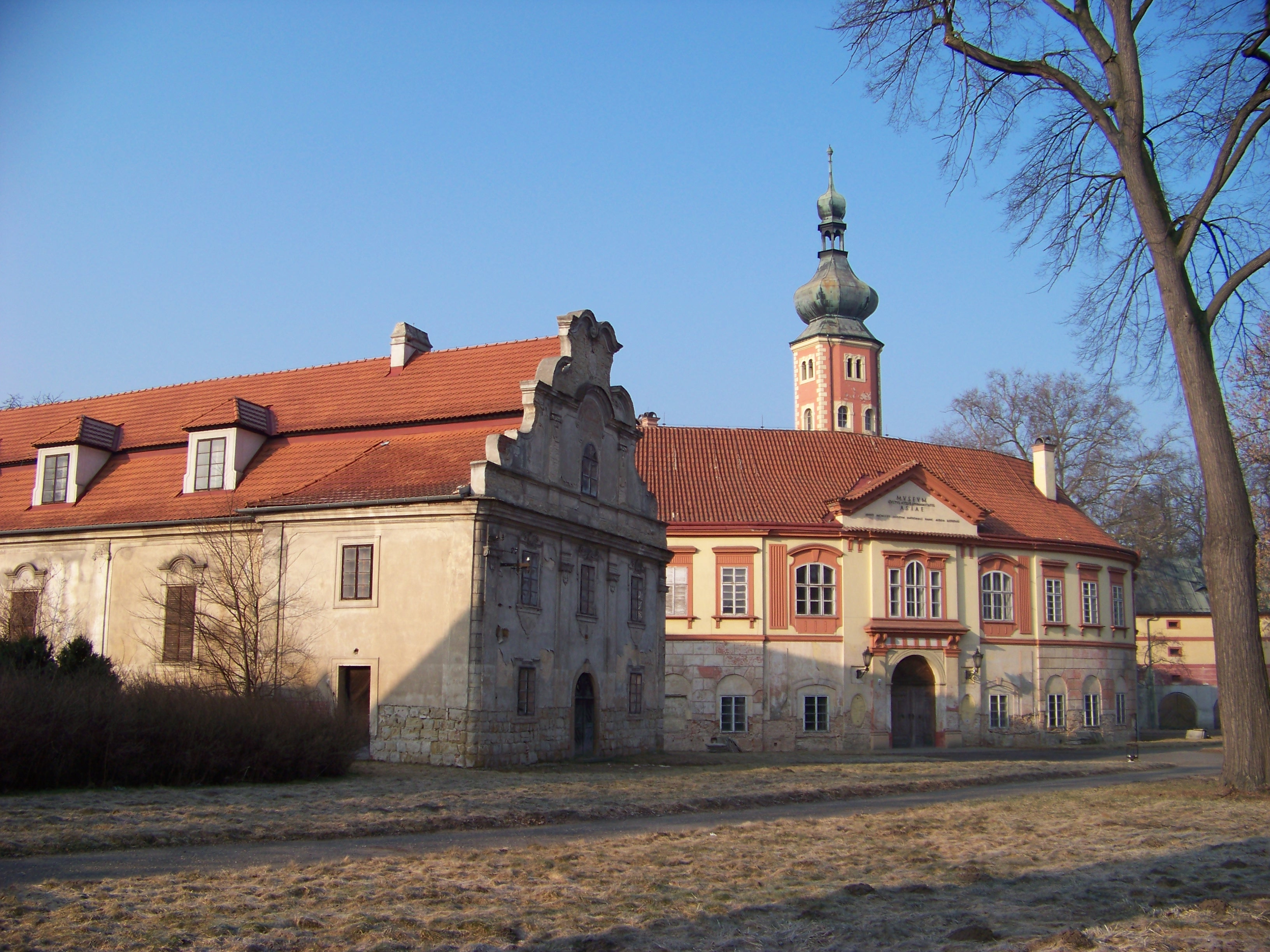
- Liběchov Castle

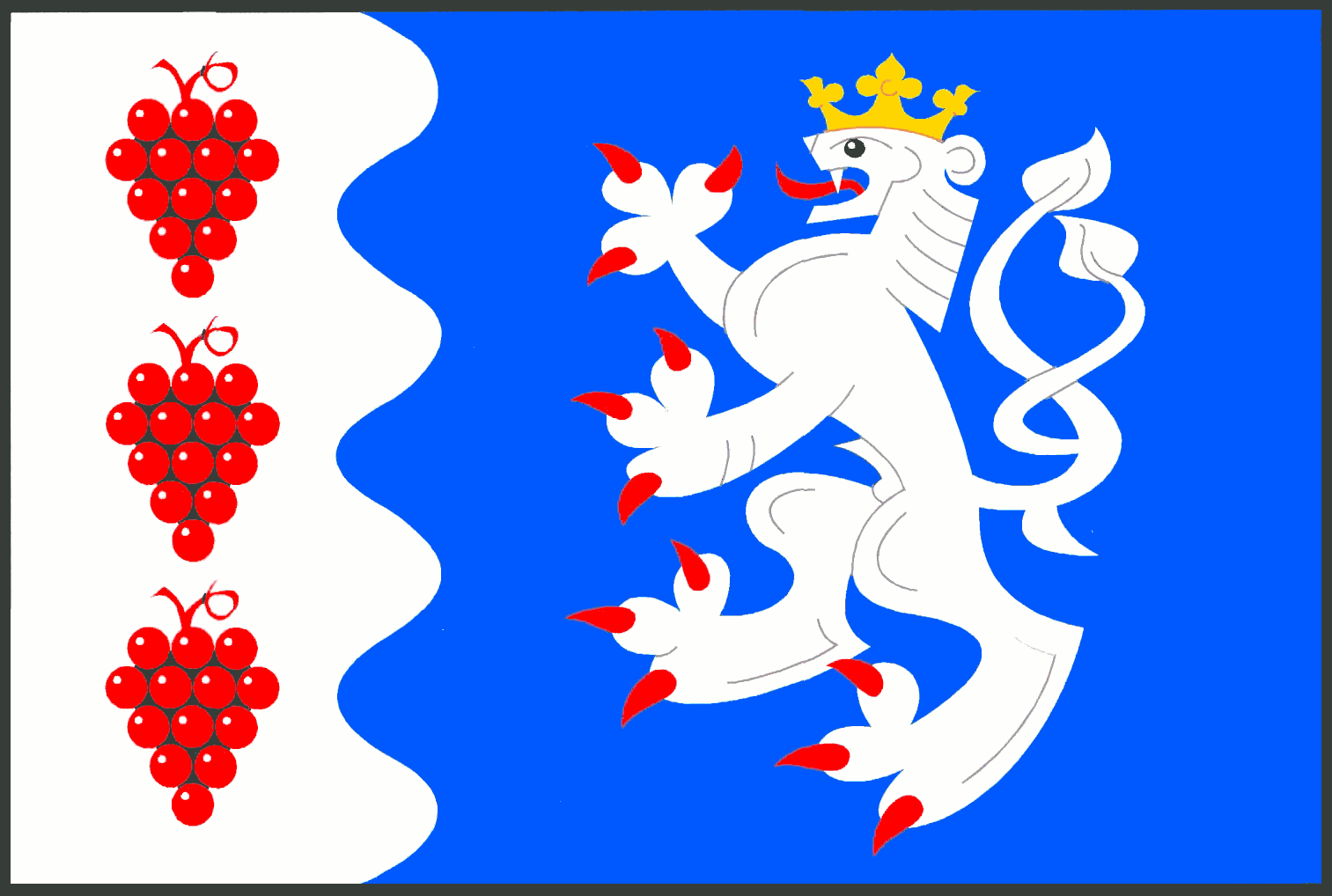
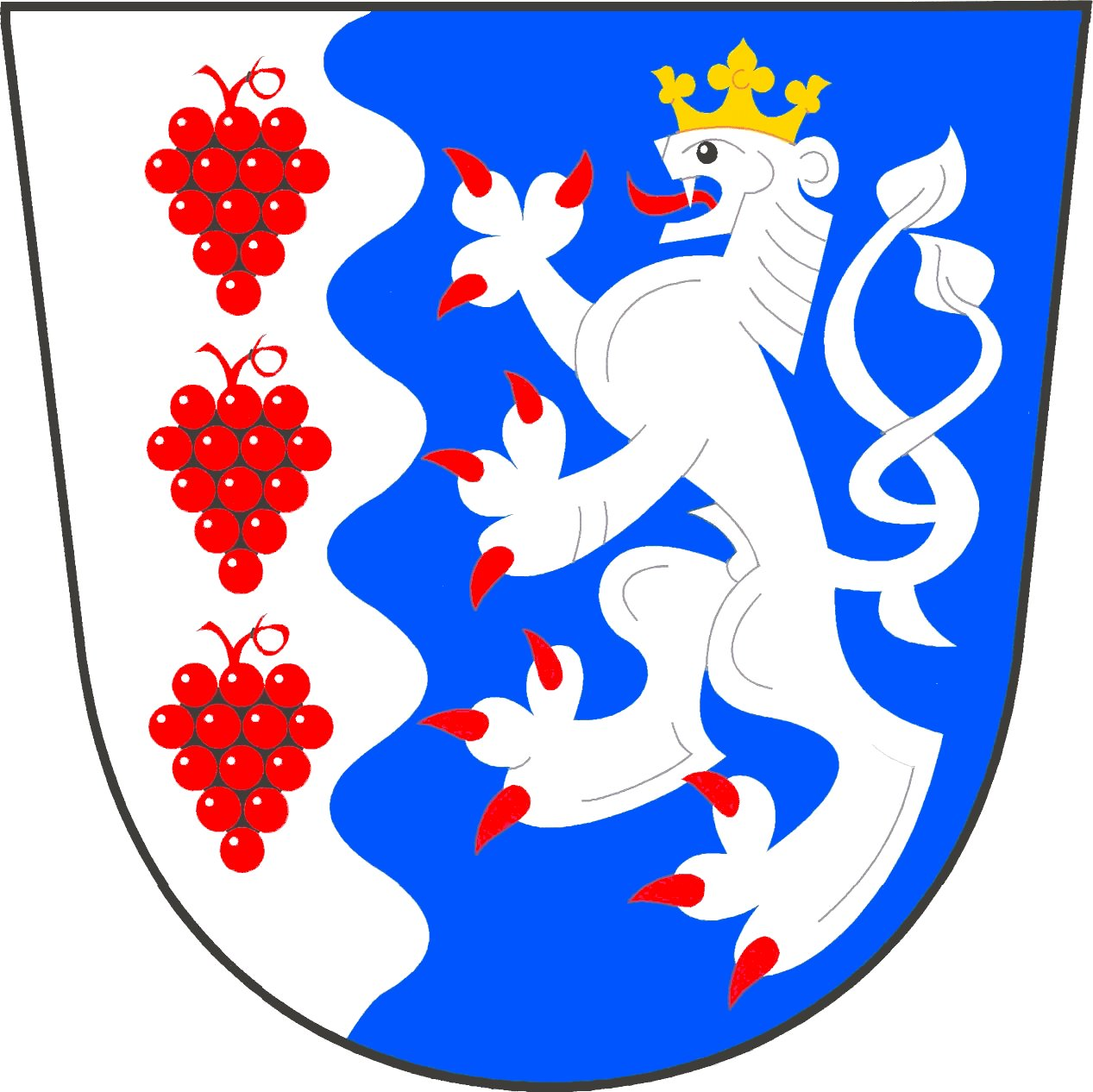
- Flag Coat of arms

- Location in the Czech Republic
- Coordinates: 50°24′29″N 14°26′48″E
- Country: Czech Republic
- Region: Central Bohemian
- District: Mělník
- First mentioned: 1311

Government
  - Mayor: Vladimíra Zralíková

Area
  - Total: 11.78 km^{2} (4.55 sq mi)
- Elevation: 171 m (561 ft)

Population (2026-01-01)
  - Total: 1,077
  - Density: 91.43/km^{2} (236.8/sq mi)
- Time zone: UTC+1 (CET)
  - Summer (DST): UTC+2 (CEST)
- Postal code: 277 21
- Website: www.libechov.cz

Liběchov (Czech pronunciation: [ˈlɪbjɛxof]; German: Liboch) is a town in Mělník District in the Central Bohemian Region of the Czech Republic. It has about 1,100 inhabitants.

== Administrative division ==
Liběchov consists of two municipal parts (in brackets population according to the 2021 census):

- Liběchov (951)
- Ješovice (144)

== Etymology ==
The name is derived from the personal name Luběch or Liběch, meaning "Luběch's/Liběch's (court)".

== Geography ==
Liběchov is located about 3 kilometres (2 mi) north of Mělník and 32 km (20 mi) north of Prague. It lies on the border between the Ralsko Uplands and Jizera Table. The municipality is situated on the right bank of the Elbe River, at its confluence with the Liběchovka Stream.

== History ==
The first written mention of Liběchov is from 1311. In the early 15th century, it was owned by a branch of the lords of Dubá. From 1440, it was property of a family that called itself the lords of Liběchov. In the second half of the 16th century, Liběchov was acquired by Knight Kašpar Belvic of Nostvice. He har rebuilt the local fortress into a Renaissance residence. The settlement was depopulated as a result of the Thirty Years' War and then Germanized.

In the 18th century, the Liběchov estate was owned by the noble Pachta family. They had rebuilt the local castle. The Veith family owned the estate in the first three quarters of the 19th century, then they sold it to Countess of Lippe-Weissenfeld. She owned the estate until 1918, but she did not live here and the estate was neglected. The last owners of the estate were the Czech Homolka family.

Before World War II, half of the population were ethnic Germans and half were Czechs. From 1938 to 1945, as a result of the Munich Agreement, Liběchov was annexed by Nazi Germany and was administered as part of the Reichsgau Sudetenland. After the war, Germans were expelled and Liběchov was resettled by Czechs.

Liběchov was promoted to a town in 1935, but lost the title after World War II. In 2007, the town title was restored.

== Demographics ==
Historical population

Year	Pop.	±%
1869	1,410	—
1880	1,350	−4.3%
1890	1,325	−1.9%
1900	1,367	+3.2%
1910	1,358	−0.7%

Year	Pop.	±%
1921	1,364	+0.4%
1930	1,810	+32.7%
1950	1,306	−27.8%
1961	1,283	−1.8%
1970	1,138	−11.3%

Year	Pop.	±%
1980	1,147	+0.8%
1991	993	−13.4%
2001	981	−1.2%
2011	1,072	+9.3%
2021	1,095	+2.1%

Source: Censuses

== Transport ==
Liběchov is located on the railway line Ústí nad Labem–Lysá nad Labem.

== Sights ==
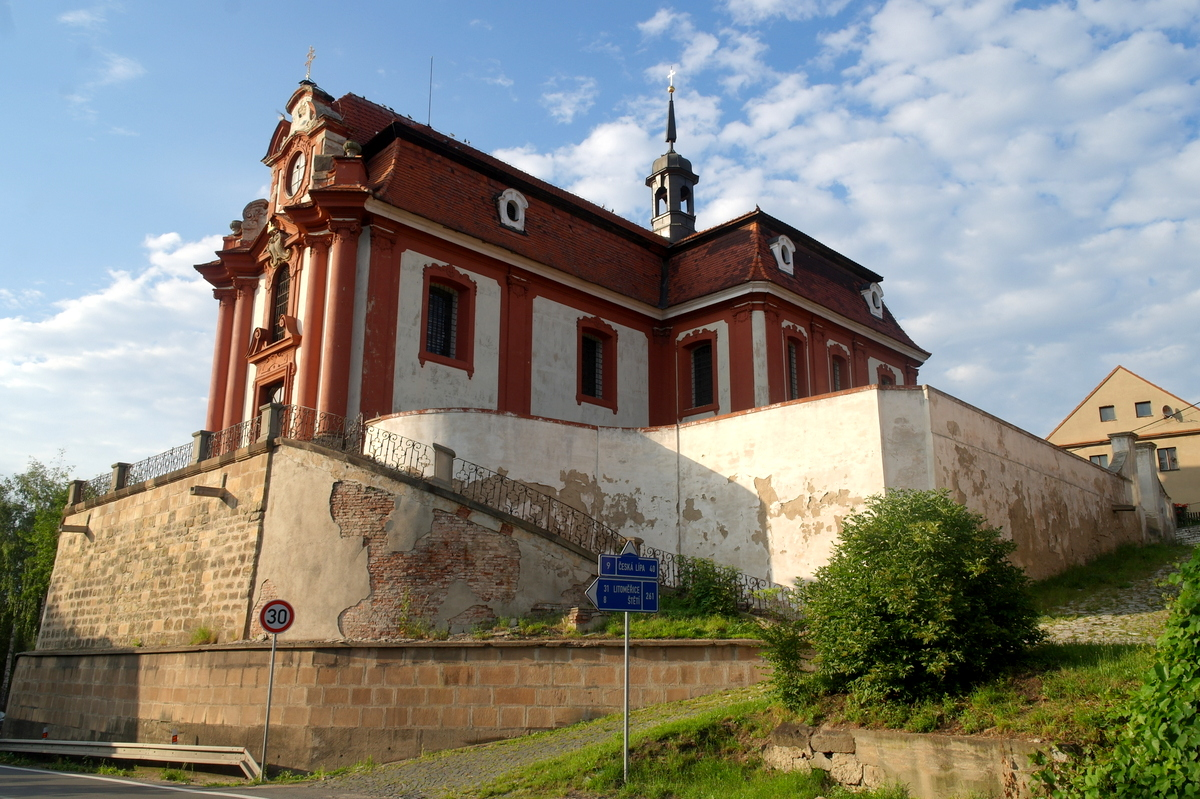
Church of Saint Gall

The main landmark is the Liběchov Castle. It was originally a water fortress from the 14th century, rebuilt into a Renaissance castle in the 16th century. In 1720–1730, the castle was rebuilt in the Baroque style by the architect František Maxmilián Kaňka and extended. After the fire in 1811, Neoclassical modifications were made. The castle was damaged during the 2002 European floods and has been inaccessible since then, but is surrounded by a freely accessible castle park.

The Church of Saint Gall was built in the Baroque style in 1738–1741.

North of the town is Klácelka, an artificial cave featuring large sculptures by Václav Levý.

== Notable people ==
- Antonín Veith (1793–1853), patron of the arts; lived and died here
- Kurt Loos (1859–1933), German forester and ornithologist; lived here and was buried here
