= Želízy =

- Municipality
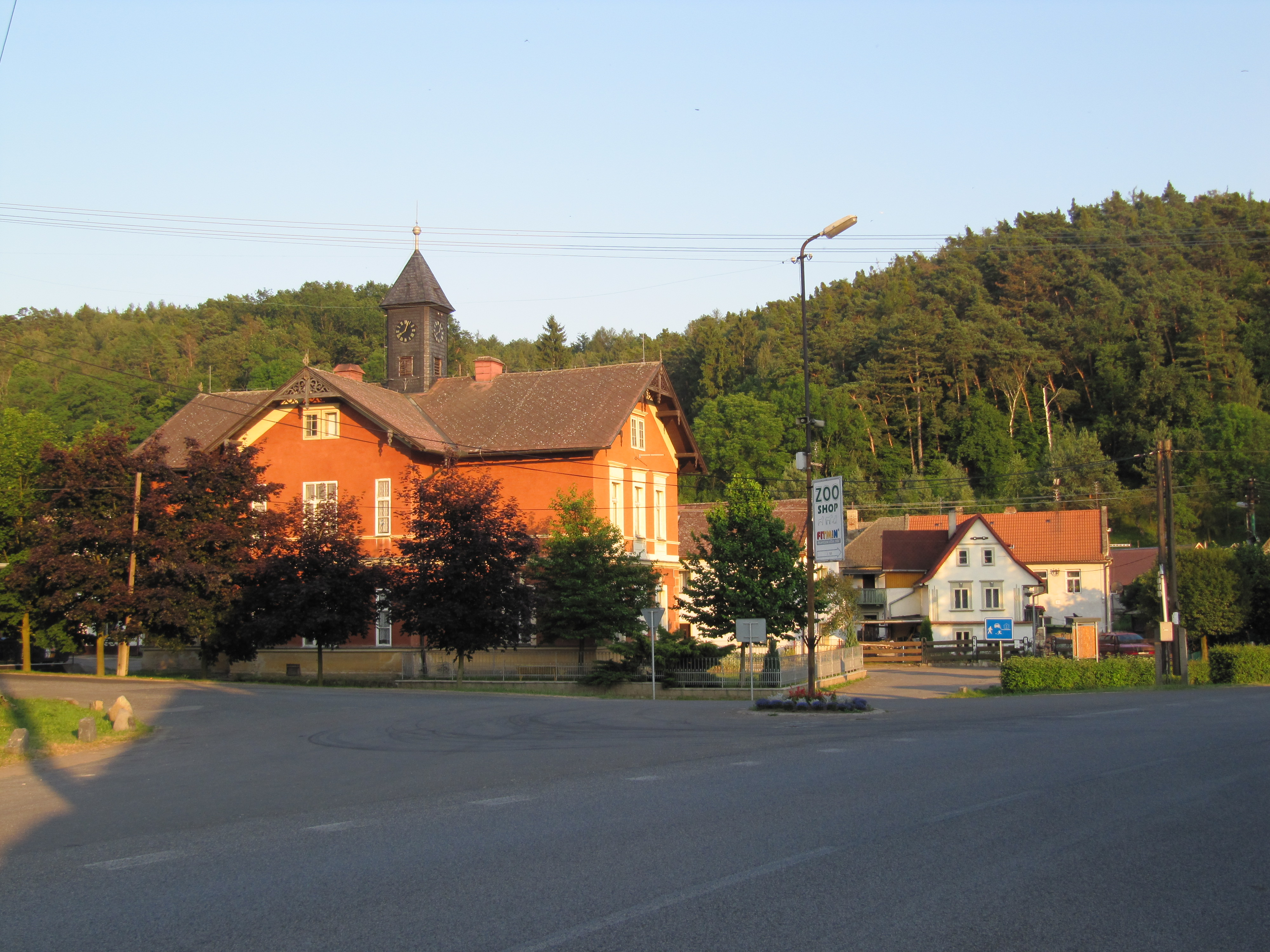
- Centre of Želízy with the primary school

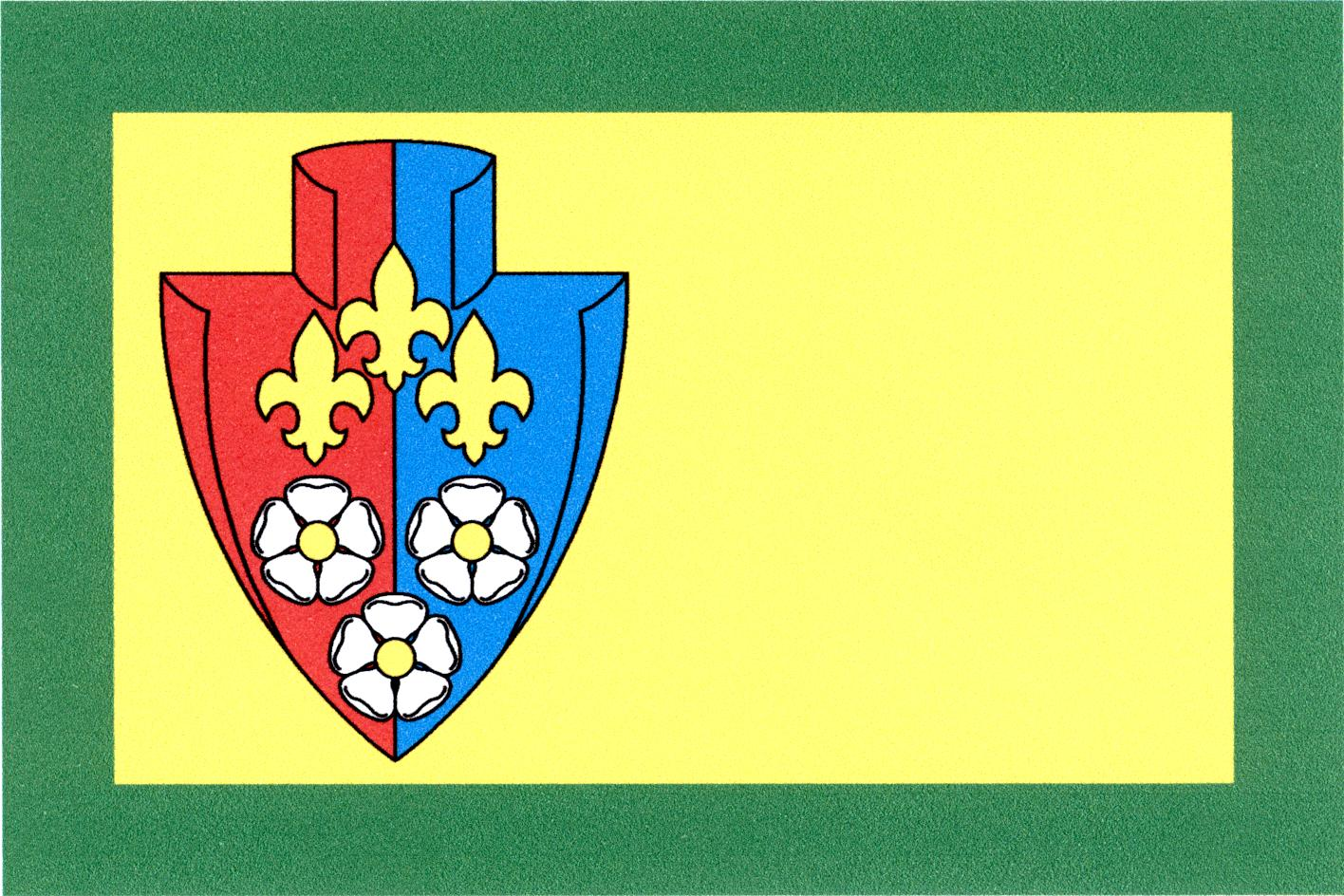
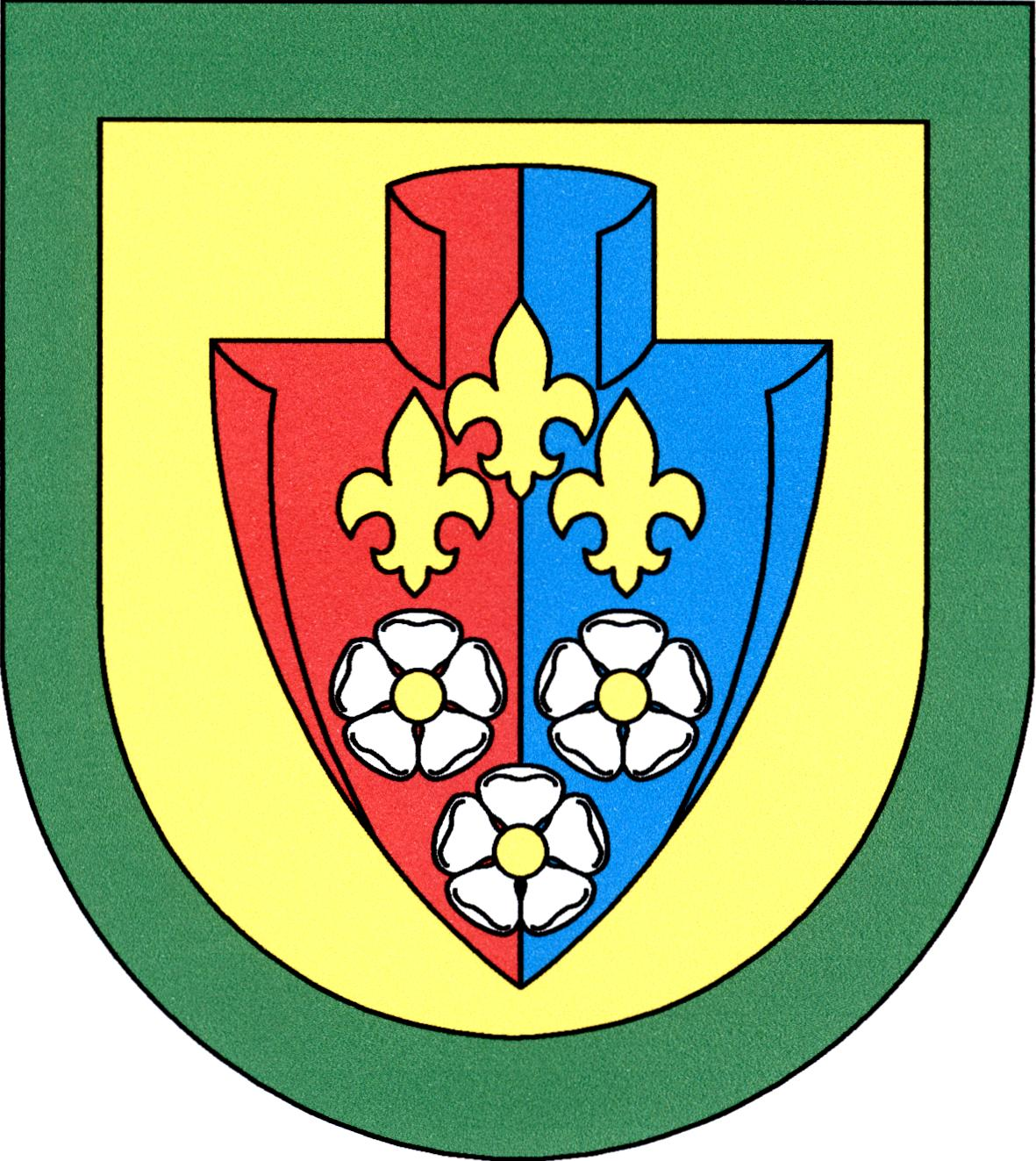
- Flag Coat of arms

- Location in the Czech Republic
- Coordinates: 50°25′26″N 14°27′53″E
- Country: Czech Republic
- Region: Central Bohemian
- District: Mělník
- First mentioned: 1360

Area
  - Total: 11.07 km^{2} (4.27 sq mi)
- Elevation: 180 m (590 ft)

Population (2026-01-01)
  - Total: 512
  - Density: 46.3/km^{2} (120/sq mi)
- Time zone: UTC+1 (CET)
  - Summer (DST): UTC+2 (CEST)
- Postal code: 277 21
- Website: www.obeczelizy.cz

Želízy (German: Schelesen) is a municipality and village in Mělník District in the Central Bohemian Region of the Czech Republic. It has about 500 inhabitants.

== Administrative division ==
Želízy consists of three municipal parts (in brackets population according to the 2021 census):

- Želízy (422)
- Nové Tupadly (7)
- Sitné (62)

== Etymology ==
The name is derived from the Czech word železo, i.e. 'iron'.

== Geography ==
Želízy is located about 7 kilometres (4 mi) north of Mělník and 34 km (21 mi) north of Prague. It lies in the Ralsko Uplands. The highest point is at 328 m (1,076 ft) above sea level. The Liběchovka Stream flows through the municipality. Most of the municipal territory lies in the Kokořínsko – Máchův kraj Protected Landscape Area.

== History ==
The first written mention of Želízy is from 1360.

In the 19th century, Želízy became a summer resort. In the interwar period it was a popular resort destination visited by hundreds of guests, especially by German-speaking Jews of Prague, including Franz Kafka.

== Demographics ==
Historical population

Year	Pop.	±%
1869	591	—
1880	603	+2.0%
1890	543	−10.0%
1900	527	−2.9%
1910	517	−1.9%

Year	Pop.	±%
1921	561	+8.5%
1930	573	+2.1%
1950	570	−0.5%
1961	673	+18.1%
1970	625	−7.1%

Year	Pop.	±%
1980	521	−16.6%
1991	461	−11.5%
2001	440	−4.6%
2011	483	+9.8%
2021	491	+1.7%

Source: Censuses

== Transport ==
The I/9 road (the section from Mělník to Česká Lípa) runs through the municipality.

== Sights ==
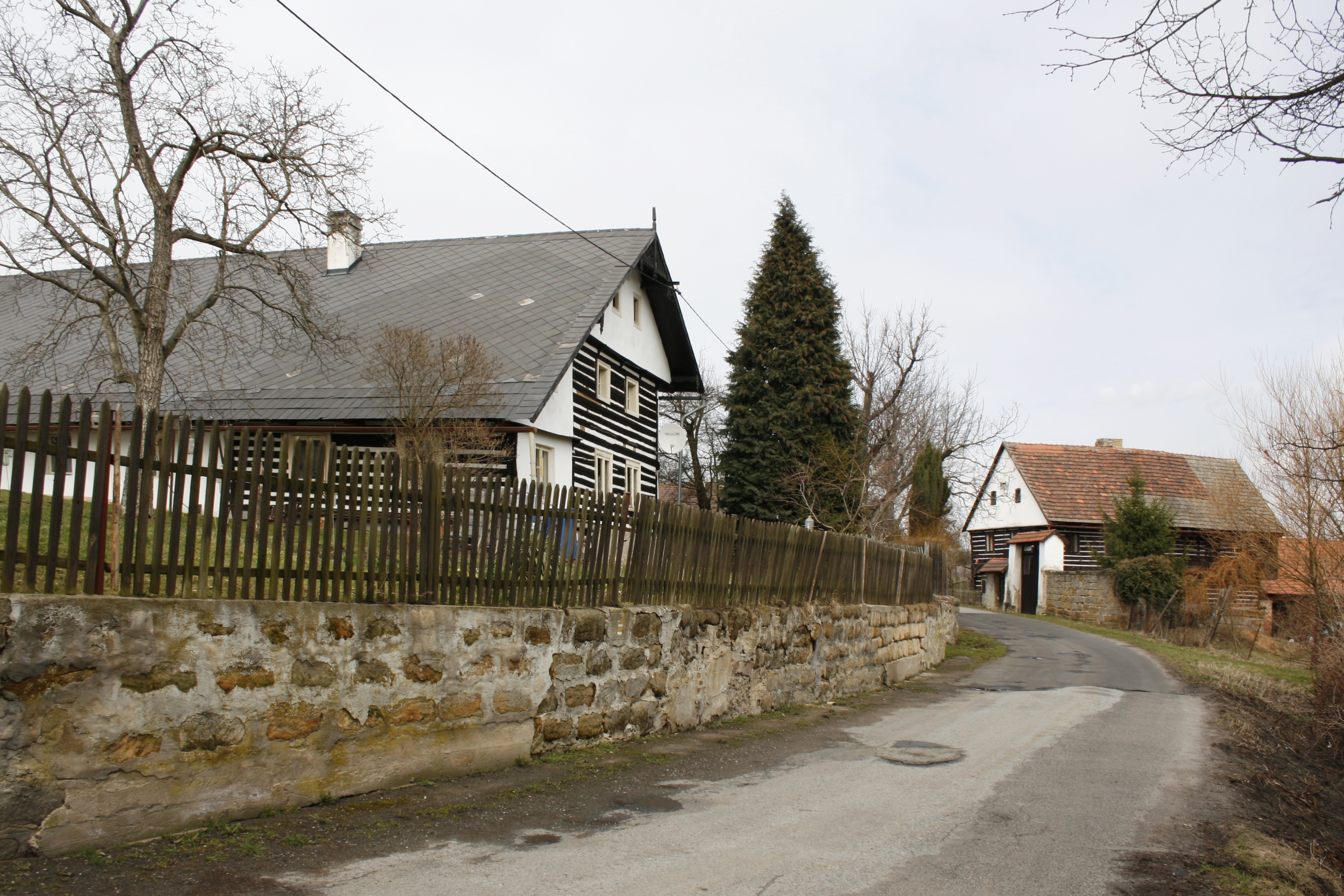
The village of Sitné

Želízy is known for the Čertovy hlavy, sculptures from the first half of the 19th century carved in the sandstone above the village of Želízy.

Most of the village of Sitné is protected as a village monument zone for its set of folk architecture wooden houses from the turn of the 18th and 19th centuries.
