= Bedřich =

Bedřich is a Czech masculine given name, a Czech variant of the German name Friedrich and English Frederick. It also appears as a surname (feminine: Bedřichová). The feminine counterpart of the given name is Bedřiška. Notable people with the name include:

== Given name ==
=== Sports ===
- Bedřich Brunclík (born 1946), Czech ice hockey player
- Bedřich Dvořák (1930–2018), Czech sprint canoeist
- Bedrich Formánek (1933–2023), Slovak chess composer
- Bedřich Hamsa (born 1965), Czech footballer
- Bedřich Köhler (born 1985), Czech ice hockey player
- Bedřich Nikodém (1909–1970), Czech table tennis player, composer and musician
- Bedřich Posselt, Czech luger and bobsledder
- Bedřich Ščerban (born 1964), Czech ice hockey player
- Bedřich Schejbal (1874–?), Czech fencer
- Bedřich Šupčík (1898–1957), Czech gymnast

=== Arts and entertainment ===
- Beda Batka, born Bedřich Baťka (1922–1994), Czech-American cinematographer
- Miroslav Bedřich Böhnel (1886–1962), Czech writer
- Bedřich Bridel (1619–1680), Czech writer, poet and missionary
- Bedřich Dlouhý (1932–2025), Czech painter
- Bedřich Feigl (1884–1965), Czech-Jewish painter, graphic designer and illustrator
- Bedřich Feuerstein (1892–1936), Czech architect, painter and essayist
- Bedřich Fritta (1906–1944), Czech-Jewish artist and cartoonist
- Bedřich Golombek (1901–1961), Czech journalist and writer
- Bedřich Havránek (1821–1899), Czech painter, illustrator and art teacher
- Jan Bedřich Kittl (1806–1868), Czech composer
- Bedřich Křídlo (1876–1902), Czech pianist, composer and music teacher
- Fritz Löhner-Beda, born Bedřich Löwy (1883–1942), Austrian librettist, lyricist and writer
- Bedřich Smetana (1824–1884), Czech composer
- Bedřich Tylšar (1939–2026), Czech horn player and music pedagogue
- Bedřich Wachsmann (1820–1897), Czech-German painter, decorator and architect
- Bedřich Diviš Weber (1766–1842), Czech composer and musicologist
- Fritz Weiss (born Bedřich Weiss; 1919–1944), Czech jazz musician and arranger
- Bedřich Antonín Wiedermann (1883–1951), Czech organist, composer and teacher

=== Other ===
- Frederick, Duke of Bohemia (Czech: Bedřich; c. 1142 – 1189), a member of the Přemyslid dynasty
- Bedrich Benes (born 1967), Czech-American computer scientist
- Bedřich Bernau, pseudonym of Přemysl Bačkora (1849–1904), Czech archaeologist and ethnographer
- Bedřich Bloudek (1815–1875), Czech military leader
- Bedřich Geminder (1901–1952), Czech politician
- Bedřich Havlíček (1922–1994), Czech historian and ethnographer
- Bedřich Homola (1887–1943), Czech army general
- Bedřich Hrozný (1879–1952), Czech orientalist and linguist
- Bedřich Moldan (born 1935), Czech ecologist, publicist and politician
- Bedřich Neumann (1891–1964), Czech army general
- Bedřich Pokorný (1904–1968), Czech secret service officer
- Bedřich Pola (born 1963), Czech entrepreneur
- Bedřich Procházka (1855–1934), Czech mathematician
- Bedřich Reicin (1911–1952), Czech politician and army officer
- Bedřich Schnirch (1791–1848), Czech engineer
- Bedřich Silva-Tarouca (1816–1881), Czech priest and patron of the arts
- Bedřich Václavek (1897–1943), Czech literary theorist and journalist

== Surname ==
- Václav Bedřich (1918–2009), Czech animator, actor and film director

== See also ==
- Bedřichov (disambiguation)
