= Slatinky =

- Municipality
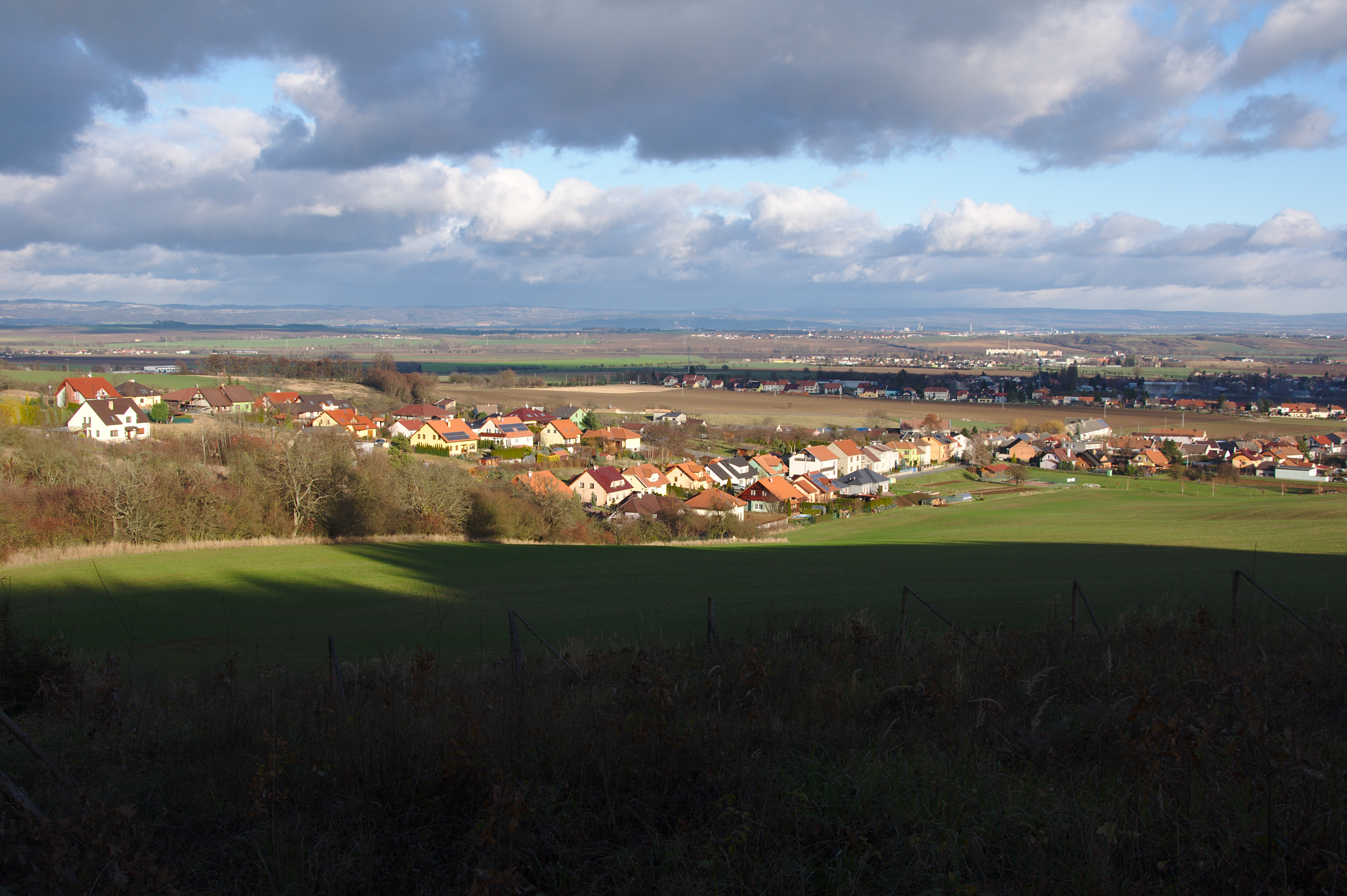
- View from the southwest

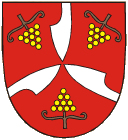
- Coat of arms

- Location in the Czech Republic
- Coordinates: 49°32′55″N 17°5′38″E
- Country: Czech Republic
- Region: Olomouc
- District: Prostějov
- First mentioned: 1247

Area
  - Total: 8.02 km^{2} (3.10 sq mi)
- Elevation: 272 m (892 ft)

Population (2026-01-01)
  - Total: 572
  - Density: 71.3/km^{2} (185/sq mi)
- Time zone: UTC+1 (CET)
  - Summer (DST): UTC+2 (CEST)
- Postal code: 783 42
- Website: www.slatinky.cz

Slatinky is a municipality and village in Prostějov District in the Olomouc Region of the Czech Republic. It has about 600 inhabitants.

== Geography ==
Slatinky is located about 8 kilometres (5 mi) north of Prostějov and 11 km (7 mi) southwest of Olomouc. It lies on the border between the Upper Morava Valley and Zábřeh Highlands. The highest point is the hill Velký Kosíř at 442 m (1,450 ft) above sea level.

The Kosířské lomy National Nature Monument extends into the southern part of the municipal territory.

== History ==
The first written mention of Slatinky is from 1247. Until the establishment of an independent municipality in 1848, the village belonged mostly to the Plumlov and Chudobín estates and to the Monastery of Saint Catherine in Olomouc.

== Demographics ==
Historical population

Year	Pop.	±%
1869	536	—
1880	577	+7.6%
1890	580	+0.5%
1900	595	+2.6%
1910	630	+5.9%

Year	Pop.	±%
1921	602	−4.4%
1930	633	+5.1%
1950	582	−8.1%
1961	610	+4.8%
1970	552	−9.5%

Year	Pop.	±%
1980	432	−21.7%
1991	416	−3.7%
2001	428	+2.9%
2011	555	+29.7%
2021	577	+4.0%

Source: Censuses

== Transport ==
The railway line Prostějov–Červenka passes through the eastern part of the municipality, but there is no train station. The municipality is served by the station Třebčín in neighbouring Lutín.

== Sights ==
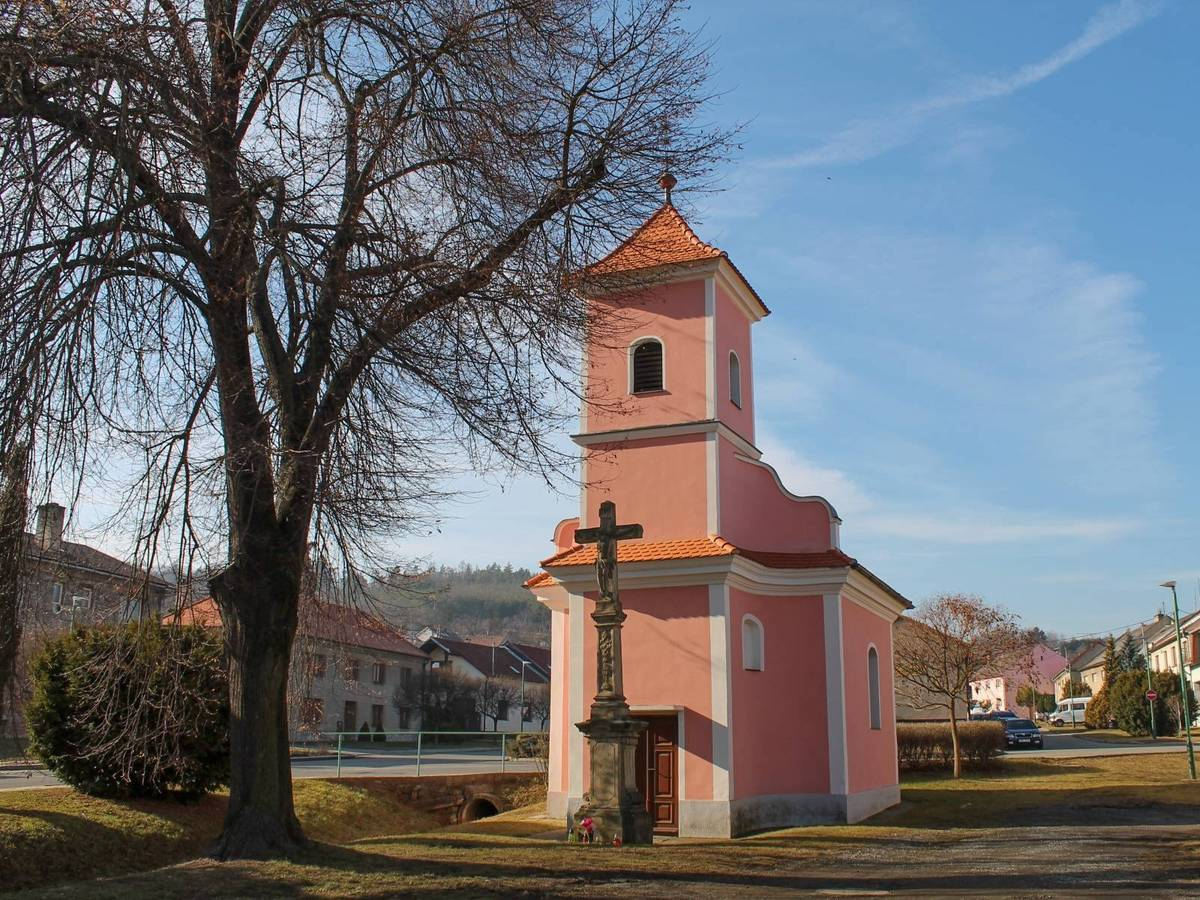
Chapel of Saints John and Paul

The only protected cultural monument is an archaeological site with 36 tumuli, dated from 5800 to 5000 BC.

The main landmark of Slatinky is the Chapel of Saints John and Paul. It dates from 1822.
