= Kosířské lomy =

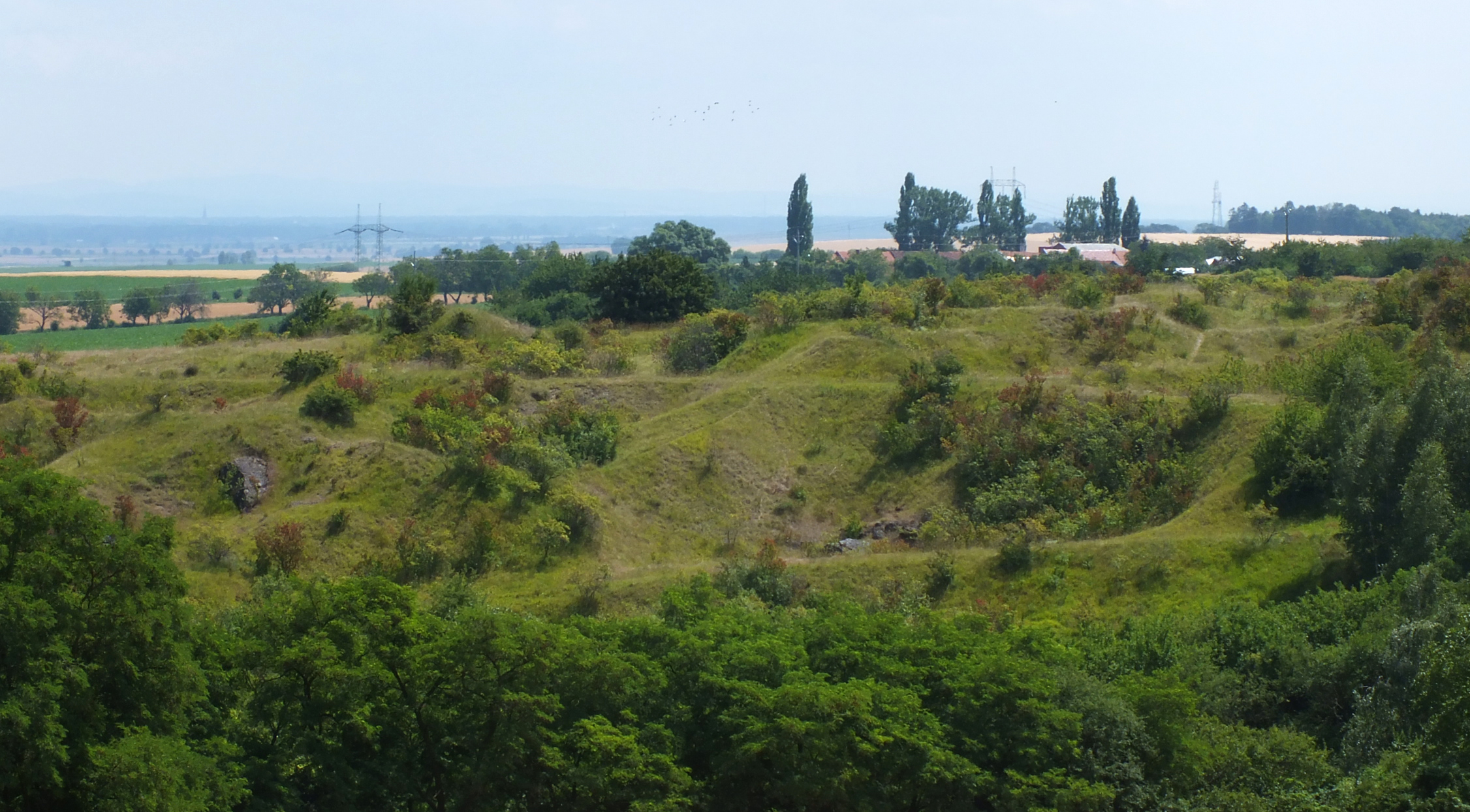
- Kosířské lomy in summer
- Interactive map of Kosířské lomy
- Location: Slatinky and Čelechovice na Hané, Olomouc Region, Czech Republic
- Coordinates: 49°32′24″N 17°5′31″E
- Area: 23.52 ha (58.1 acres)
- Elevation: 275 m (902 ft)
- Established: 5 April 2017
- Operator: Nature and Landscape Protection Agency of the Czech Republic

Kosířské lomy (literally "Kosíř quarries") is a national nature monument in the Olomouc Region of the Czech Republic.

== Location ==
The monument is made up of four separate areas. There were three separate nature monuments (Státní lom, Růžičkův lom and Vápenice) until 2017. The area is administered by the Nature and Landscape Protection Agency of the Czech Republic. The former area of Vápenice, located in Slatinky, is the largest part of Kosířské lomy. Two parts are located in Čelechovice na Hané.

Kosířské lomy lies within the Velký Kosíř nature park.

== Description ==
Bedrock of Kosířské lomy consists of Devonian dolomites and the Lažánky limestone, which are partly covered by Badenian (mid-Miocene) calcareous clays and sands. This is the reason why the area has become an enclave of lime-tolerant (calciphile) vegetation.

The locality is protected because of the rare plant community, especially hot dry (xerothermic) grasslands, growing on terrain bumps, which are remnants of former minor limestone quarries (which gave Vápenice its Czech name). Beside them there used to be a number of little fields and pastures for livestock. Some of the balks which used to separate the fields are preserved and help to prevent erosion. There are also some residues of orchards in the northern part of the area.

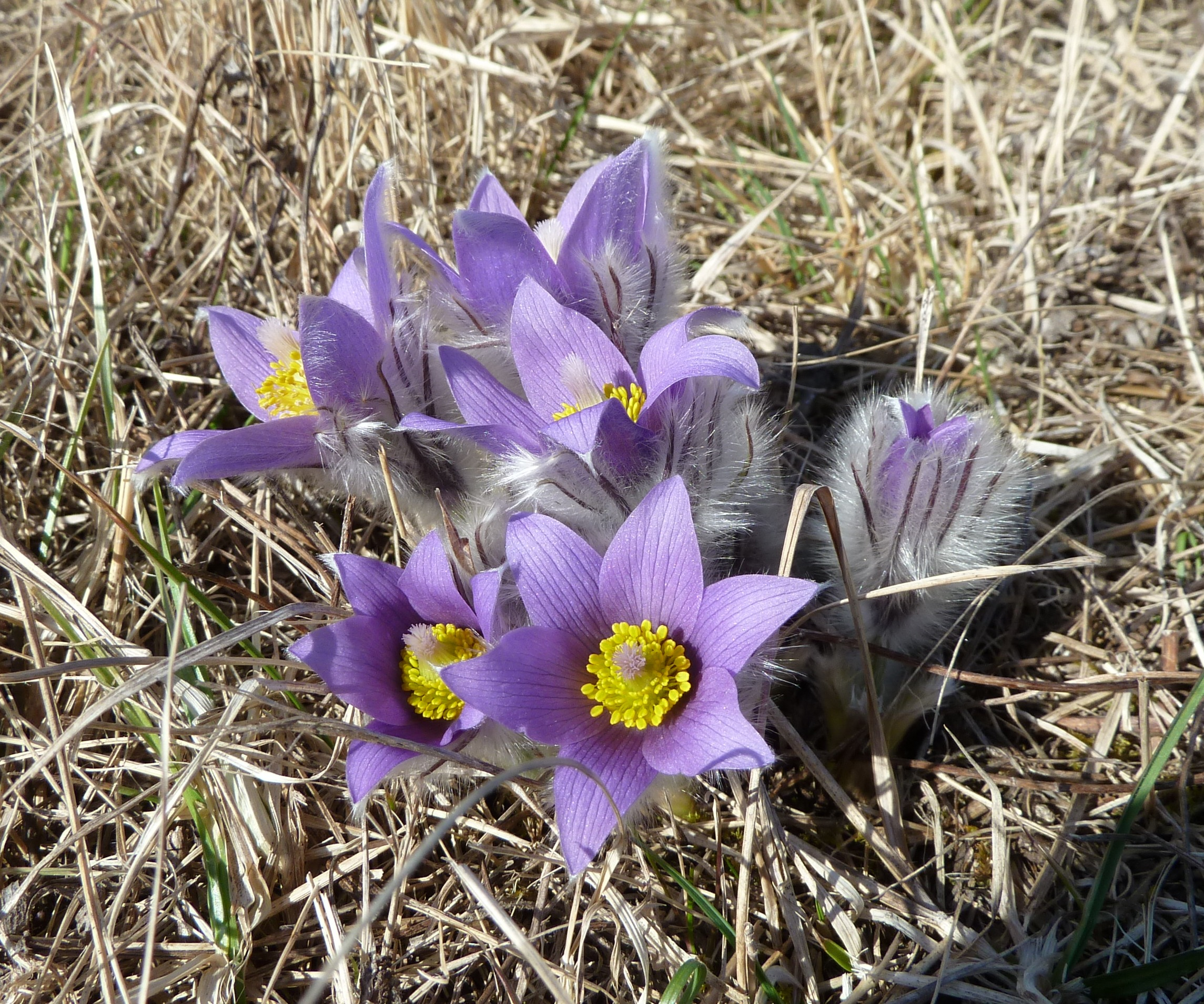
Greater anemone growing at Kosířské lomy

Steppe-like vegetation grows here mostly. The place is also valued as one of the richest populations of greater anemone (Pulsatilla grandis) in Central Moravia; in the 2004 census, 19,699 blooms were counted here. Other notable plants growing here are snowdrop anemone (Anemone sylvestris), European Michaelmas daisy (Aster amellus), sickle hare's ear (Bupleurum falcatum), Blue Sedge (Carex flacca), Downy-fruited Sedge (Carex tomentosa), Carex michelii, European dwarf cherry (Prunus fruticosa), Dorycnium herbaceum, field cow-wheat (Melampyrum arvense), spiny restharrow (Ononis spinosa), military orchid (Orchis militaris), knapweed broomrape (Orobanche elatior), Pilosella macrantha, Primula veris subsp. canescens, fragrant scabious (Scabiosa canescens) and Thesium dollineri. Bigger stones are covered by saxicolous lichens, which are an important indicator of the level of air pollution. The grasslands need to be maintained and shrubs of black locust (Robinia pseudacacia), common dogwood (Cornus sanguinea) and European privet (Ligustrum vulgare) have to be regularly removed here.

Weed vegetation of the Caucalidion lappulae alliance can be found at the edges of some surrounding fields, including rare species summer pheasant's-eye (Adonis aestivalis), poorman's weatherglass (Anagallis foemina), Caucalis platycarpos, hare's ear mustard (Conringia orientalis), longleaf (Falcaria vulgaris) and Thymelaea passerina.

Kosířské lomy is also important from an entomological point of view. There live a number of insects dependent on the local shrub-steppe grasslands. Some of notable species which were observed here are for example European mantis (Mantis religiosa) and moth Jersey tiger (Euplagia quadripunctaria).

The area of the locality is 23.52 ha (58.1 acres) and it lies 264–318 metres above sea level. It has been protected as a national nature monument of the Czech Republic since 5 April 2017, when its status was declared by the Regional Authority of the Olomouc Region. The locality was also registered by the IUCN in the category IV (habitat management area) and together with other abandoned limestone quarries at the slopes of Velký Kosíř was included among the Natura 2000 sites under the name Kosířské lomy, code CZ0714076. One of the reasons for listing it is that the locality is valued as an important orchid site.
