= Vážany =

Vážany may refer to places in the Czech Republic:

- Vážany (Blansko District), a municipality and village in the South Moravian Region
- Vážany (Uherské Hradiště District), a municipality and village in the Zlín Region
- Vážany (Vyškov District), a municipality and village in the South Moravian Region
- Vážany, a village and part of Kroměříž in the Zlín Region
- Vážany nad Litavou, a municipality and village in the South Moravian Region
