= Procházka =

Procházka (Czech pronunciation: [ˈpr̩oxaːzka]; feminine: Procházková) is a Czech surname. It is among the top ten common Czech surnames. The oldest document showing the existence of the surname is from 1618. Literal translation of the name is 'stroll', 'walk'; the name approximates to the English surname Walker. The name could have originated in several ways – it denoted a wanderer, someone who walks through the village, someone who likes to walk, or figuratively someone lazy.

The name was anglicised, germanised and hungarised as Prochaska, Prohaska and Prohászka. Notable people with the surname include:

== Sports ==
- Alena Procházková (born 1984), Slovak cross country skier
- Antonín Procházka (volleyball) (born 1942), Czech volleyball player
- Barbora Procházková (born 1991) Czech sprinter
- Dana Procházková (born 1951), Czech orienteer
- Daniel Procházka (born 1995), Czech footballer
- František Procházka (1962–2012), Czech ice hockey player
- Jan Procházka (orienteer) (born 1984), Czech orienteer
- Jiří Procházka (born 1992), Czech martial artist
- Jiří Procházka (ice dancer) (born 1980), Czech ice dancer
- Libor Procházka (born 1974), Czech ice hockey player
- Martin Procházka (born 1972), Czech ice hockey player
- Ondřej Procházka (born 1997), Czech ice hockey player
- Petr Procházka (born 1964) is a Czech sprint canoeist
- Radek Procházka (born 1978), Czech ice hockey player
- Roman Procházka (born 1989), Slovak footballer
- Stanislav Procházka (born 1973), Czech ice hockey player
- Václav Procházka (born 1984), Czech footballer
- Václav Procházka (equestrian) (1904–1985), Czech equestrian
- Zdeněk Procházka (1928–2016), Czech footballer

== Other ==
- Antonín Procházka (actor) (born 1953), Czech actor, playwright and director
- Antonín Procházka (painter) (1882–1945), Czech painter
- Bedřich Procházka (1855–1934), Czech mathematician
- Gustav Adolf Procházka (1872–1942), Czech Hussite bishop
- Jan Procházka (writer) (1929–1971), Czech writer
- Jan Ludevít Procházka (1837–1888), Czech pianist and composer
- Jaro Procházka (1886–1949), Czech painter
- Jiří Walker Procházka (born 1959), Czech writer
- Lenka Procházková (born 1951), Czech writer
- Pauline Prochazka (1842–1930), Irish watercolour artist
- Petra Procházková (born 1964), Czech war journalist
- Radoslav Procházka (born 1972), Slovak lawyer and politician
- Zdenka Procházková (1926–2021), Czech actress
