= Bedřichov =

Bedřichov may refer to places in the Czech Republic:

- Bedřichov (Blansko District), a municipality and village in the South Moravian Region
- Bedřichov (Jablonec nad Nisou District), a municipality and village in the Liberec Region
- Bedřichov, a village and part of Horní Stropnice in the South Bohemian Region
- Bedřichov, a village and part of Nepoměřice in the Central Bohemian Region
- Bedřichov, a village and part of Oskava in the Olomouc Region
- Bedřichov, a village and part of Pacov in the Vysočina Region
- Bedřichov, a village and part of Špindlerův Mlýn in the Hradec Králové Region
