= Boletina =

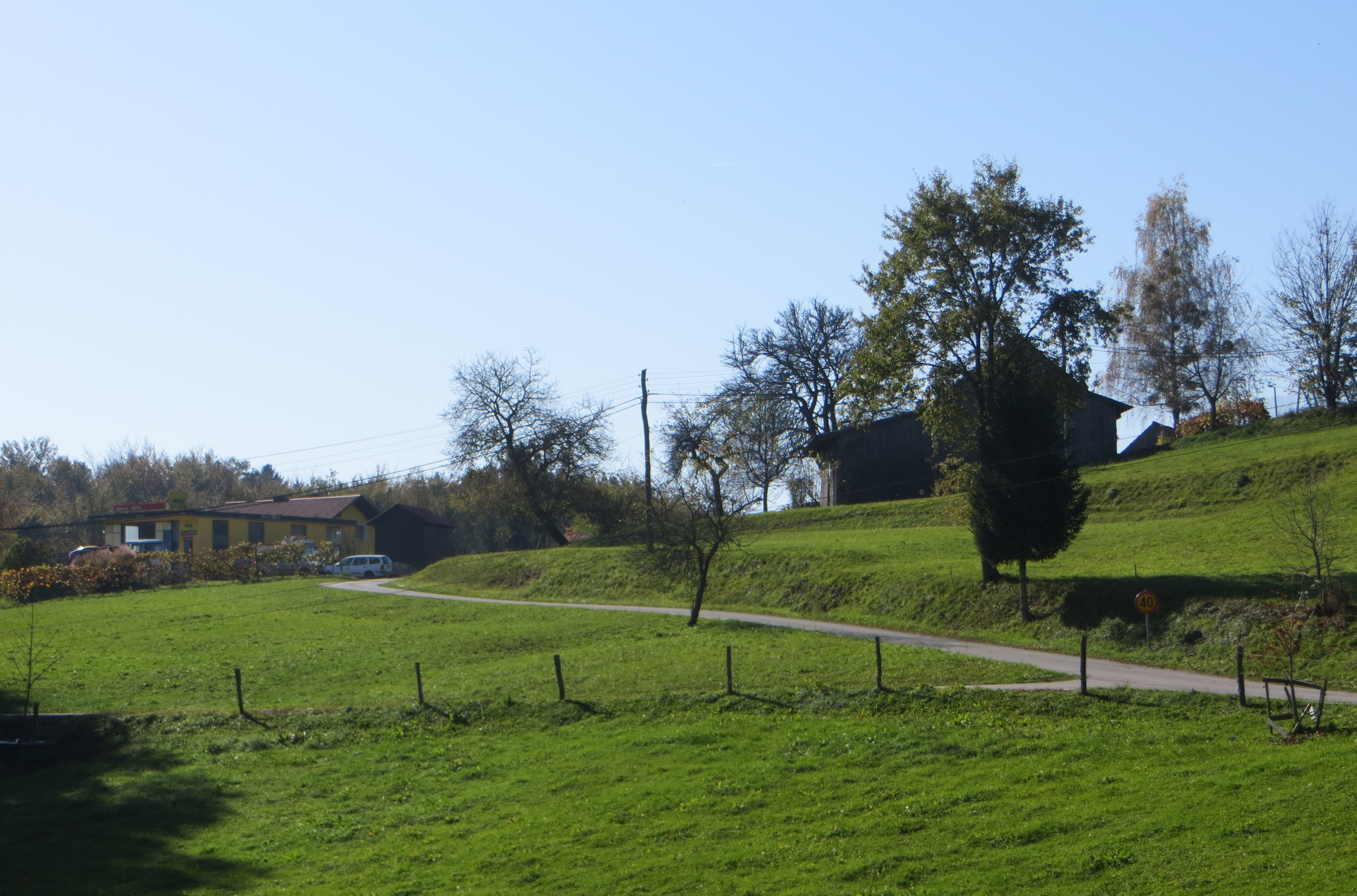

- Location in Slovenia
- Coordinates: 46°15′18.79″N 15°27′39.51″E
- Country: Slovenia
- Traditional region: Styria
- Statistical region: Savinja
- Municipality: Šentjur

Area
  - Total: 1.81 km^{2} (0.70 sq mi)
- Elevation: 329.4 m (1,081 ft)

Population (2020)
  - Total: 151
  - Density: 83.4/km^{2} (216/sq mi)

Boletina (pronounced [ˈboːlɛtina]) is a settlement to the east of Ponikva in the Municipality of Šentjur, in eastern Slovenia. The settlement, and the entire municipality, are included in the Savinja Statistical Region, which is in the Slovenian portion of the historical Duchy of Styria. Close to the settlement is one of the rare habitats where the pasque flower grows in Slovenia.
