= Čelechovice na Hané =

- Municipality
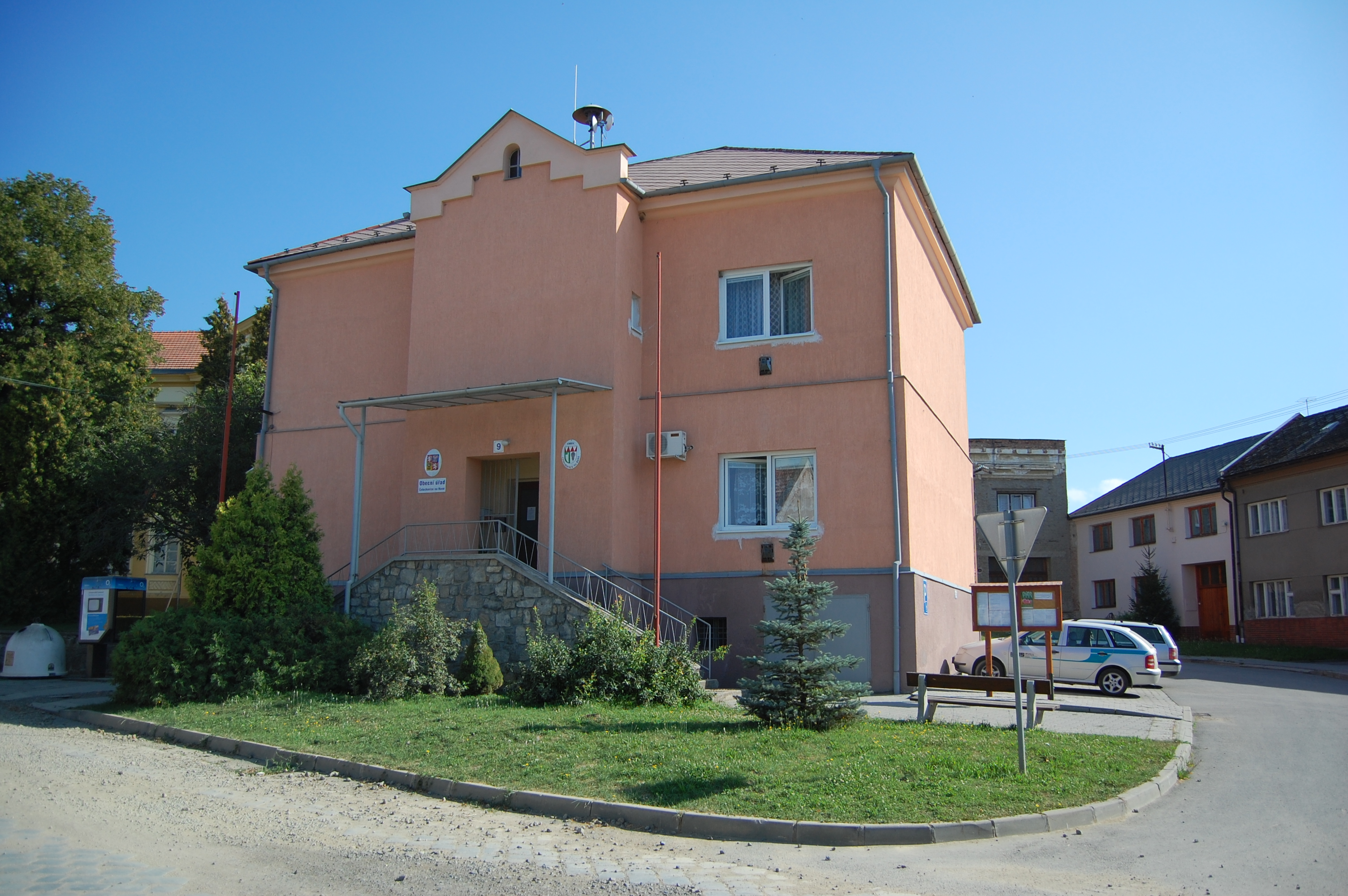
- Municipal office

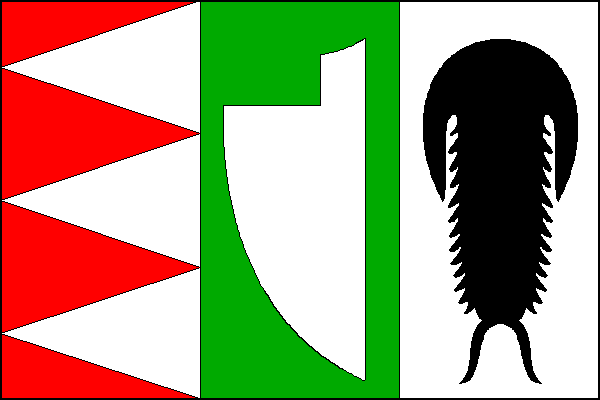
- Flag Coat of arms

- Location in the Czech Republic
- Coordinates: 49°30′59″N 17°5′38″E
- Country: Czech Republic
- Region: Olomouc
- District: Prostějov
- First mentioned: 1315

Area
  - Total: 7.27 km^{2} (2.81 sq mi)
- Elevation: 234 m (768 ft)

Population (2026-01-01)
  - Total: 1,342
  - Density: 185/km^{2} (478/sq mi)
- Time zone: UTC+1 (CET)
  - Summer (DST): UTC+2 (CEST)
- Postal code: 798 16
- Website: www.celechovice-na-hane.cz

Čelechovice na Hané is a municipality and village in Prostějov District in the Olomouc Region of the Czech Republic. It has about 1,300 inhabitants.

== Administrative division ==
Čelechovice na Hané consists of three municipal parts (in brackets population according to the 2021 census):

- Čelechovice na Hané (1,004)
- Kaple (121)
- Studenec (162)

== Geography ==
Čelechovice na Hané is located about 5 kilometres (3 mi) north of Prostějov and 13 km (8 mi) southwest of Olomouc. It lies mostly in the Upper Morava Valley, only the northwestern part of the municipal territory lies in the Zábřeh Highlands. The highest point is at 340 m (1,115 ft) above sea level. Part of the Kosířské lomy National Nature Monument is located in the territory of Čelechovice na Hané.

== History ==
The first written mention of Čelechovice is from 1315. From 1500 until its abolition in 1782, the village was owned by the Poor Clares Monastery in Olomouc. In 1789, part of the land formerly belonging to the monastery was used to found a new settlement near Čelechovice, which was named Kaple.

The first written mention of Studenec is from 1141. A larger part of the village was owned by the Olomouc Chapter and a smaller part was ruled by various lower noblemen. It was a separate municipality until 1950, when it was merged with Čelechovice and the newly created municipality was named Čelechovice na Hané.

== Demographics ==
Historical population

Year	Pop.	±%
1869	1,026	—
1880	1,287	+25.4%
1890	1,426	+10.8%
1900	1,549	+8.6%
1910	1,714	+10.7%

Year	Pop.	±%
1921	1,805	+5.3%
1930	1,808	+0.2%
1950	1,593	−11.9%
1961	1,692	+6.2%
1970	1,542	−8.9%

Year	Pop.	±%
1980	1,382	−10.4%
1991	1,141	−17.4%
2001	1,180	+3.4%
2011	1,246	+5.6%
2021	1,287	+3.3%

Source: Censuses

== Transport ==
Čelechovice na Hané is located on the Prostějov–Červenka railway line.

== Sights ==
The main landmark of Čelechovice na Hané is the Chapel of the Sacrifice of the Virgin Mary from 1820. Next to the chapel is a stone cross from 1776.
