= Prohaska =

Prohaska is a surname, derived from the Czech surname Procházka. Notable people with the surname include:

- Anna Prohaska (born 1983), Austrian-British singer
- Felix Prohaska (1912–1987), Austrian conductor
- Franz Prohaska, Austrian footballer
- Herbert Prohaska (born 1955), Austrian footballer
- Janos Prohaska (1919–1974), Hungarian-American actor and stunt performer
- Maddie Prohaska (born 2002), American soccer player
- Miljenko Prohaska (1925–2014), Croatian composer and conductor
- Nadine Prohaska (born 1990), Austrian footballer
- Ray Prohaska (1901–1981), Montenegrin-American artist
