= Jaroslav Svoboda =

Czech ice hockey player (born 1980)

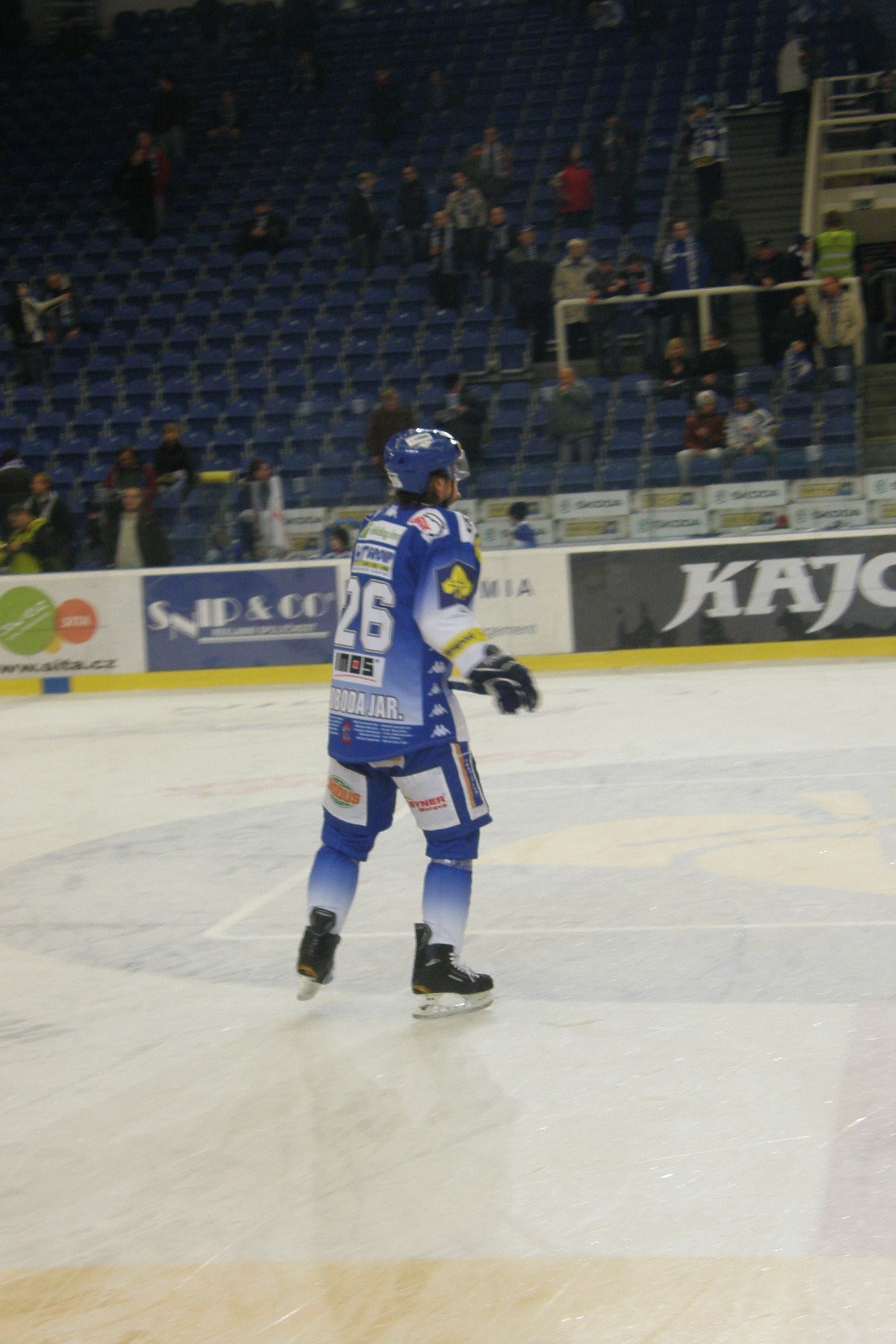
- Svoboda in 2011
- Born: June 1, 1980 (age 46) Červenka, Czechoslovakia
- Height: 6 ft 2 in (188 cm)
- Weight: 190 lb (86 kg; 13 st 8 lb)
- Position: Right wing
- Shot: Left
- Played for: HC Nové Zámky; MHC Mountfield; Piráti Chomutov; Sparta Praha; HC Lev Praha; HC Kometa Brno; Orli Znojmo; Dallas Stars; Oceláři Třinec; Carolina Hurricanes
- National team: Czech Republic
- NHL draft: 208th overall, 1998; Carolina Hurricanes
- Playing career: 1997–2017

Jaroslav Svoboda (born June 1, 1980) is a Czech former professional ice hockey right winger. He played in the National Hockey League with the Carolina Hurricanes and Dallas Stars between 2001 and 2006. The rest of his career, which lasted from 1997 to 2017, was mainly spent in the Czech Extraliga. Internationally Svoboda played for the Czech national junior team at the European U18 Championships and the World Junior Championships, winning a gold medal at the 2000 World Juniors.

== Biography ==
Svoboda was born in Červenka, Czechoslovakia. As a youth, he played in the 1994 Quebec International Pee-Wee Hockey Tournament with a team from Olomouc.

Svoboda was drafted in the 8th round, 208th overall by the Carolina Hurricanes in the 1998 NHL entry draft and spent three seasons with the team, sharing his time in the American Hockey League with the Lowell Lock Monsters. After spending a season in the Czech Republic during the NHL lockout, Svoboda signed with the Dallas Stars in 2005 and managed to play 43 regular season games for them. In total, Svoboda has played 134 regular season games and has scored 12 goals and 17 assists for 29 points. He has also played in 25 playoff games (23 with Carolina in 2001–02).

He returned to Europe in 2006, and later played for HC Znojemští Orli in the Czech Extraliga.

== Career statistics ==
=== Regular season and playoffs ===
			Regular season					Playoffs
Season	Team	League	GP	G	A	Pts	PIM	GP	G	A	Pts	PIM
1995–96	HC Olomouc U20	CZE-U20	40	13	15	28	—	—	—	—	—	—
1996–97	HC Olomouc U18	CZE-U18	2	0	0	0	—	—	—	—	—	—
1996–97	HC Olomouc U20	CZE-U20	37	19	14	33	—	—	—	—	—	—
1997–98	HC Olomouc U20	CZE-U20	36	14	21	35	—	—	—	—	—	—
1997–98	HC Olomouc	CZE-2	15	0	1	1	—	—	—	—	—	—
1998–99	Kootenay Ice	WHL	54	26	33	59	46	7	2	2	4	11
1999–00	Kootenay Ice	WHL	56	23	43	66	97	21	15	13	28	51
1999–00	Kootenay Ice	M-Cup	—	—	—	—	—	3	0	0	0	10
2000–01	Cincinnati Cyclones	IHL	52	4	10	14	25	—	—	—	—	—
2001–02	Lowell Lock Monsters	AHL	66	12	16	28	58	—	—	—	—	—
2001–02	Carolina Hurricanes	NHL	10	2	2	4	2	23	1	4	5	28
2002–03	Lowell Lock Monsters	AHL	9	1	1	2	10	—	—	—	—	—
2002–03	Carolina Hurricanes	NHL	48	3	11	14	32	—	—	—	—	—
2003–04	Carolina Hurricanes	NHL	33	3	1	4	6	—	—	—	—	—
2003–04	Lowell Lock Monsters	AHL	9	2	2	4	4	—	—	—	—	—
2004–05	HC Oceláři Třinec	CZE	9	0	2	2	14	—	—	—	—	—
2004–05	HC Olomouc	CZE-2	18	7	6	13	67	—	—	—	—	—
2005–06	Dallas Stars	NHL	43	4	3	7	22	2	0	0	0	2
2006–07	HC Znojemští Orli	CZE	51	10	0	10	160	9	1	1	2	56
2007–08	HC Znojemští Orli	CZE	38	12	8	20	60	1	0	0	0	27
2008–09	HC Znojemští Orli	CZE	42	11	3	14	36	—	—	—	—	—
2009–10	HC Kometa Brno	CZE	42	8	4	12	49	—	—	—	—	—
2010–11	HC Kometa Brno	CZE	27	2	4	6	18	—	—	—	—	—
2011–12	HC Kometa Brno	CZE	41	5	6	11	47	19	3	3	6	24
2012–13	HC Lev Praha	KHL	25	2	0	2	4	—	—	—	—	—
2012–13	Sparta Praha	CZE	4	3	0	3	2	7	0	2	2	6
2013–14	Piráti Chomutov	CZE	25	8	4	12	43	—	—	—	—	—
2014–15	HC Red Ice	NLB	5	1	2	3	0	—	—	—	—	—
2014–15	MHC Mountfield	SVK	18	3	5	8	24	5	1	1	2	4
2015–16	HC Nové Zámky	SVK-2	17	12	9	21	6	—	—	—	—	—
2016–17	HC Nové Zámky	SVK	3	0	1	1	4	4	0	1	1	4
CZE totals			279	59	31	90	429	60	11	15	26	127
NHL totals			134	12	17	29	62	25	1	4	5	30

=== International ===
Year	Team	Event	GP	G	A	Pts	PIM
1998	Czech Republic	EJC	6	2	3	5	6
2000	Czech Republic	WJC	7	1	2	3	6
Junior totals			13	3	5	8	12
