= St. Catherine Monastery, Olomouc =

Monastery in Olomouc, Czech Republic

Monastery of St. Catherine
- Kostel svaté Kateřiny
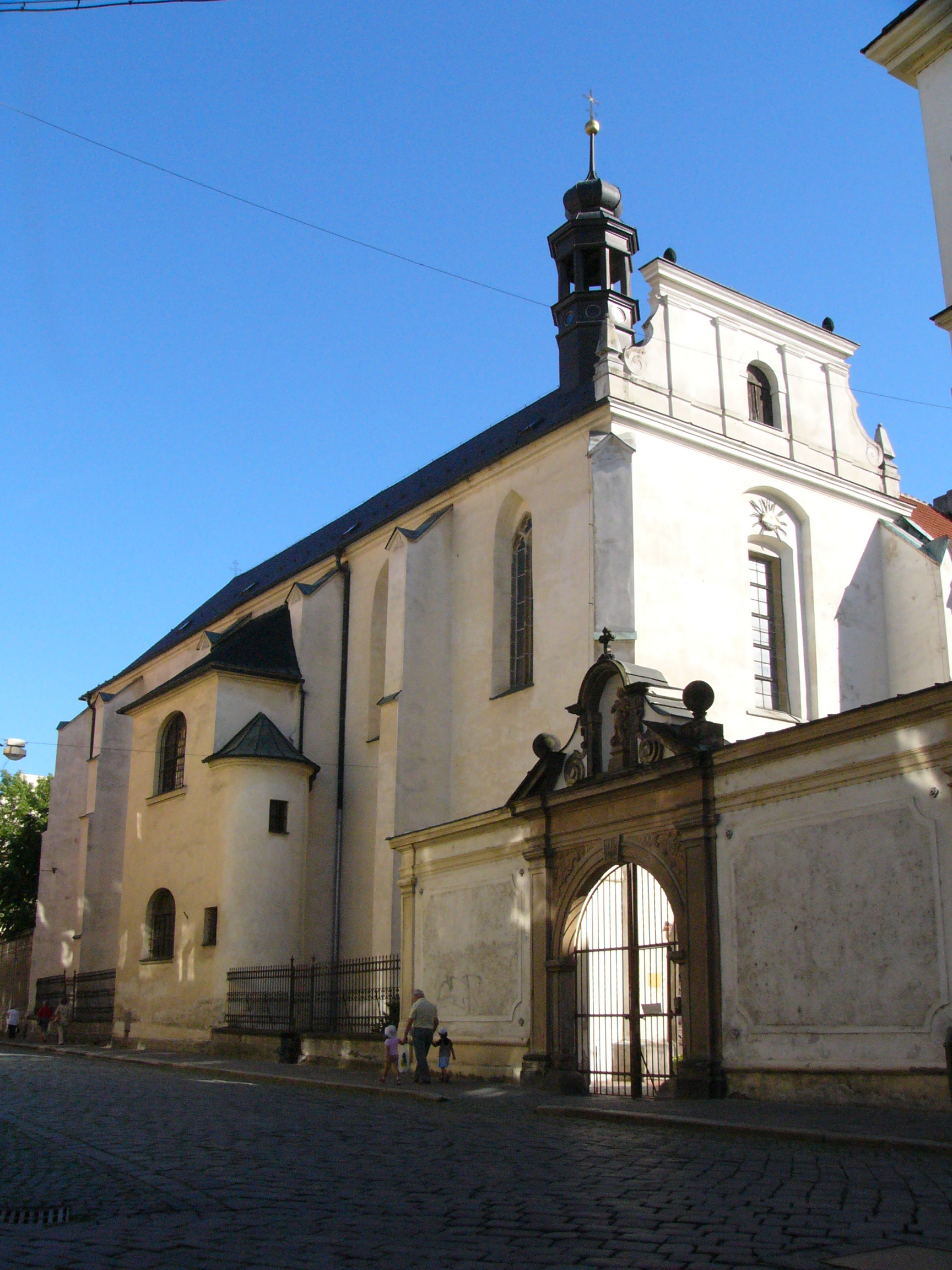
- Church of St. Catherine in Olomouc

- Location within Czech Republic
- Interactive map of Monastery of St. Catherine

Monastery information
- Order: Dominican nuns (1287–1782), Ursulines (1782–1951)
- Established: 1287
- Disestablished: 1782, 1951
- Dedication: St. Catherine of Alexandria
- Diocese: Archdiocese of Olomouc

Architecture
- Status: suppressed
- Functional status: museum
- Style: Gothic & Baroque
- Groundbreaking: 1287
- Completion date: 1905

Site
- Coordinates: 49°35′26″N 17°15′14″E

The Monastery of St. Catherine (Czech: Kostel svaté Kateřiny) in Olomouc, Czech Republic, was founded in 1287 for a community of Dominican nuns, who occupied it until 1782, when it passed over to the Ursuline nuns. The Ursuline Order remained in the monastery until 1951, when it was suppressed and converted to secular use under the Communist regime. It has been since used by the Regional Museum of Olomouc.

== Historical aspects ==
The history of the two Orders of nuns who inhabited the monastery was influenced by many important personalities from both sacred and secular circles. The beginnings of the monastery are connected with the patronage of King Wenceslaus II of Bohemia, members of the royal family and noble families, the pope and the Bishop of Olomouc.

=== Establishment ===
The monastery was established in the Polish province and is among the oldest monasteries of Dominican nuns in Bohemia and Moravia. It was constructed for the nuns in the second half of the 13th century. First reports of its existence are from the year 1287, when Vojslava of Deblín gave the patronage rights of the church in Vážany to the monastery. It was built in an undeveloped area at foot of the Michalský Hill at the southern tip of the city, between the city wall and blocks of houses near the marketplace on the present-day Lower Square.

== Monastery buildings ==
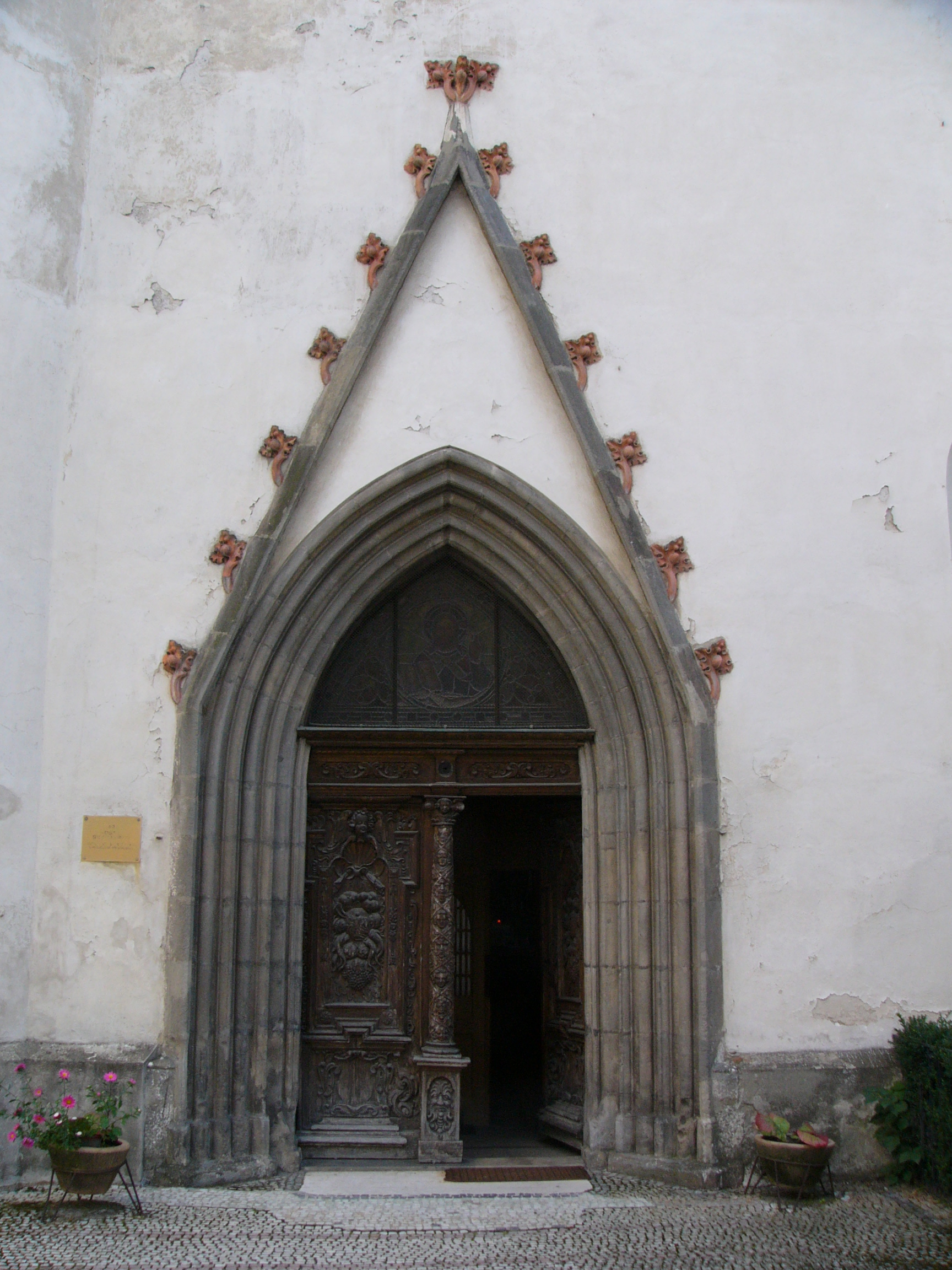
Gothic portal of the Church of St. Catherine in Olomouc

The architectural, artistic, and historical aspects of the monastery buildings have been assessed by a number of researchers, but a scientific assessment of the convent complex has not yet been performed. There are not many research findings about its architectural history, but on the basis of the combination of pictorial and written sources, and materials from the preserved structure, it is possible to reconstruct the architectural development of the monastery.

The inconspicuous monastery complex is now enclosed by blocks of houses in the southern part of the historic city centre and the monastery is one of the most important historic landmarks in Olomouc. The building is representative of various architectural styles and in the centre of the monastery is one of the oldest and most extraordinary Gothic buildings in Olomouc – the Monastery Church of St. Catherine of Alexandria. Other parts of the monastery date back to the Middle Ages and Renaissance, which were built over during a reconstruction in the Baroque style. The monastery was significantly structurally modified for the last time in the 19th century and the first half of the 20th century.

=== Development ===
It is supposed that the buildings of the complex developed gradually according to the needs of the monastic community and its financial resources . During the first decades of its existence, the Dominican nuns enjoyed a good economic situation. The high point of the monastery's history was in the 14th century. Although the majority of the monasteries of Dominican nuns disappeared after the Hussite Wars, the Dominican nuns in Olomouc survived without further calamities until the community was suppressed in 1782, under the reforms of Emperor Joseph II. It was claimed at the time that the monastery, among others, was disbanded because the nuns failed to care for the sick and promote education. During this period, its Baroque buildings were constructed.

=== Damage by fire ===
In the course of time, the monastery was damaged by several great fires, as well as the conflicts of the Thirty Years War and a major fire in the city in 1709. The monastery was again reconstructed in the middle of the 18th century. After the Dominican community was disbanded, the buildings were made available for the use of the Ursulines. They had the building remodeled for their own needs, adding some buildings, particularly for classrooms and housing for their students. These structural transformations of the complex were finished before the middle of the 19th century by the church interior alterations.

In 1905 a new school building was constructed in the south part of the old monastery complex. Occupancy by the Ursulines ended in 1951, under the Czechoslovak Socialist Republic when nearly all religious institutions in the country were closed.

== Current status ==
At present, the monastery is being used for secular purposes. Its buildings form a complex of structures around four courts with a garden at the western wall. It is not a unified scheme of buildings and courts. As the monastery's composition was developed by the build-up and spread of the buildings, it developed asymmetrically. The most well-preserved building is the monastery church, in which the Gothic Architecture was preserved with many original details, especially the portals and vaults of the long presbytery. It has preserved the original segmentation of the interior by the window cornice, truncated support column with capitals, and windows with tracery.

Well-preserved fragments of artistic and hand-done decoration remain on the walls of the monastery. Surveys have discovered previously unknown architectural details of the oldest structure.

From the older interior decorating of the monastery, only fragments of the church interior, several Baroque sculptures and pictures of saints, Neo-Gothic furniture, and altar pieces have been preserved.

The monastery complex is currently mostly unused while it awaits reconstruction and preservation.
