= Prochaska =

Prochaska is a surname, derived from the Czech surname Procházka. Notable people with the surname include:

- Alice Prochaska (born 1947), English archivist and librarian
- Andreas Prochaska (born 1964), Austrian film director
- Antoni Prochaska (1852–1930), Polish historian
- Eleonore Prochaska (1785–1813) German female soldier
- Georg Prochaska (1749–1820), Czech-Austrian physician
- James O. Prochaska (1942–2023), American psychologist
- Ray Prochaska (1919–1997), American gridiron football player and coach
