= Prohászka =

Prohászka is a Hungarian surname, derived from the Czech surname Procházka. Notable people with the surname include:

- Janos Prohaska, born János Prohászka (1919–1974), Hungarian-American actor and stunt performer
- Martin Prohászka (born 1973), Slovak footballer
- Ottokár Prohászka (1858–1927), Hungarian Roman Catholic bishop
- Péter Prohászka (born 1992), Hungarian chess grandmaster
