= Antonín Procházka (painter) =

Czech artist

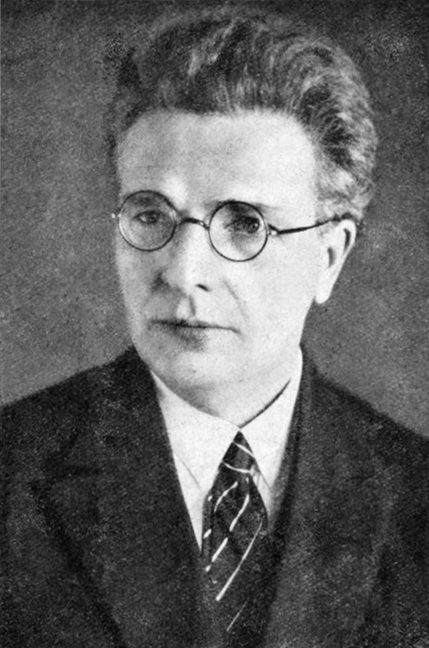
Antonín Procházka (1932)

Antonín Procházka (5 June 1882 – 9 June 1945, in Brno) was a Czech Cubist painter and graphic artist.

== Biography ==
Procházka was born on 5 June 1882 in Vážany, Moravia. He graduated from the gymnasium in Kroměříž then, in 1902, began studies at the Academy of Arts, Architecture and Design in Prague with Vlaho Bukovac, Hanuš Schwaiger and Max Švabinský. In 1907, he and his classmate, Emil Filla, joined the group "Osma" ("The Eight"), together with Bohumil Kubišta, Emil Artur Longen, Otakar Kubín, Bedřich Feigl, Max Horb and Willi Nowak. It was then that he was introduced to the newest art movements, such as Fauvism and Cubism.

In 1911, he married the German painter, Linka Scheithauer, whom he had met while travelling. Two years later, Herwarth Walden invited him, Filla, Kubin and Vincenc Beneš to participate in the Erster Deutscher Herbstsalon (Autumn Salon) in Berlin, where he displayed a cubist still-life.

He became a drawing teacher at a girls' school in Brno in 1924. There, in 1938, he created a monumental painting, "Prometheus Bringing Fire to Mankind" for Masaryk University. During the Nazi German occupation, he provided illustrations for a collection of folk ballads by Karel Jaromír Erben.

From 1909 to 1911, and again from 1923 to 1929, he was a member of the Mánes Union of Fine Arts. Originally an Expressionist, he moved through Cubism to create his own personal form of Neoclassicism. He also created some small equestrian statues of President Tomáš Masaryk.

Procházka died on 9 June 1945 in Brno. In 1946, he received the posthumous title of "Národní umělec" (People's Artist) from the Czechoslovak Republic. A street in Brno is named after him.

== Selected paintings ==
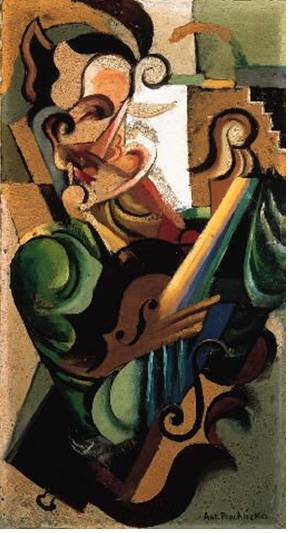
The Violinist

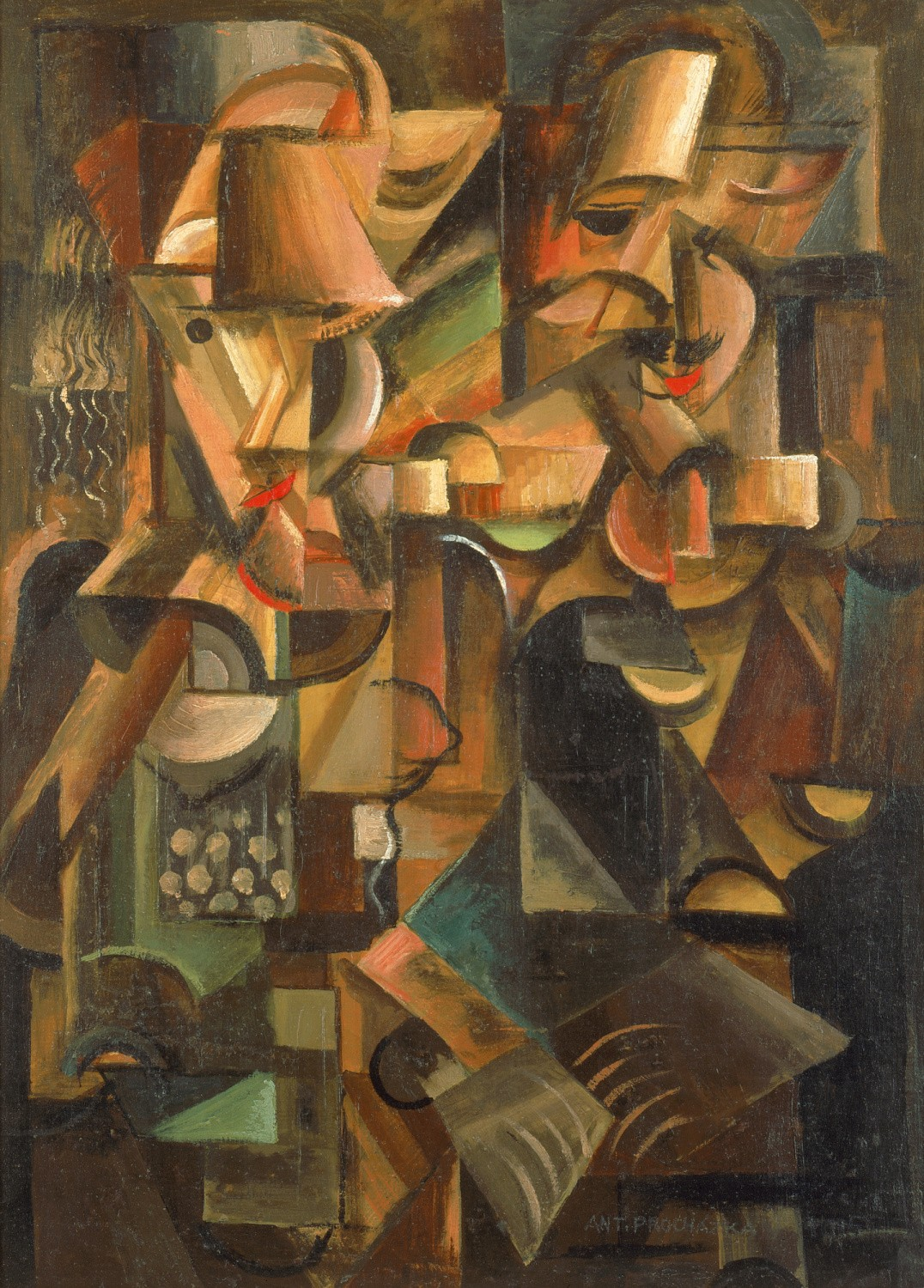
Husband and Wife

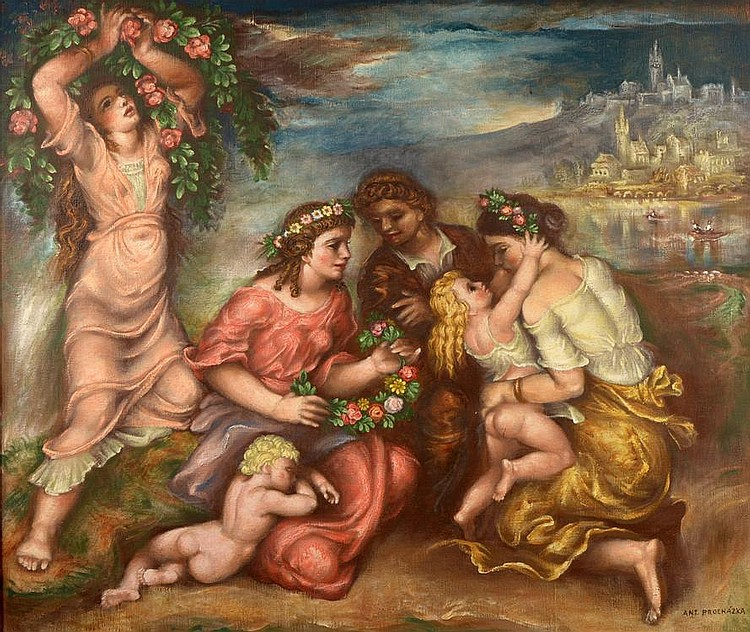
Wreath Making

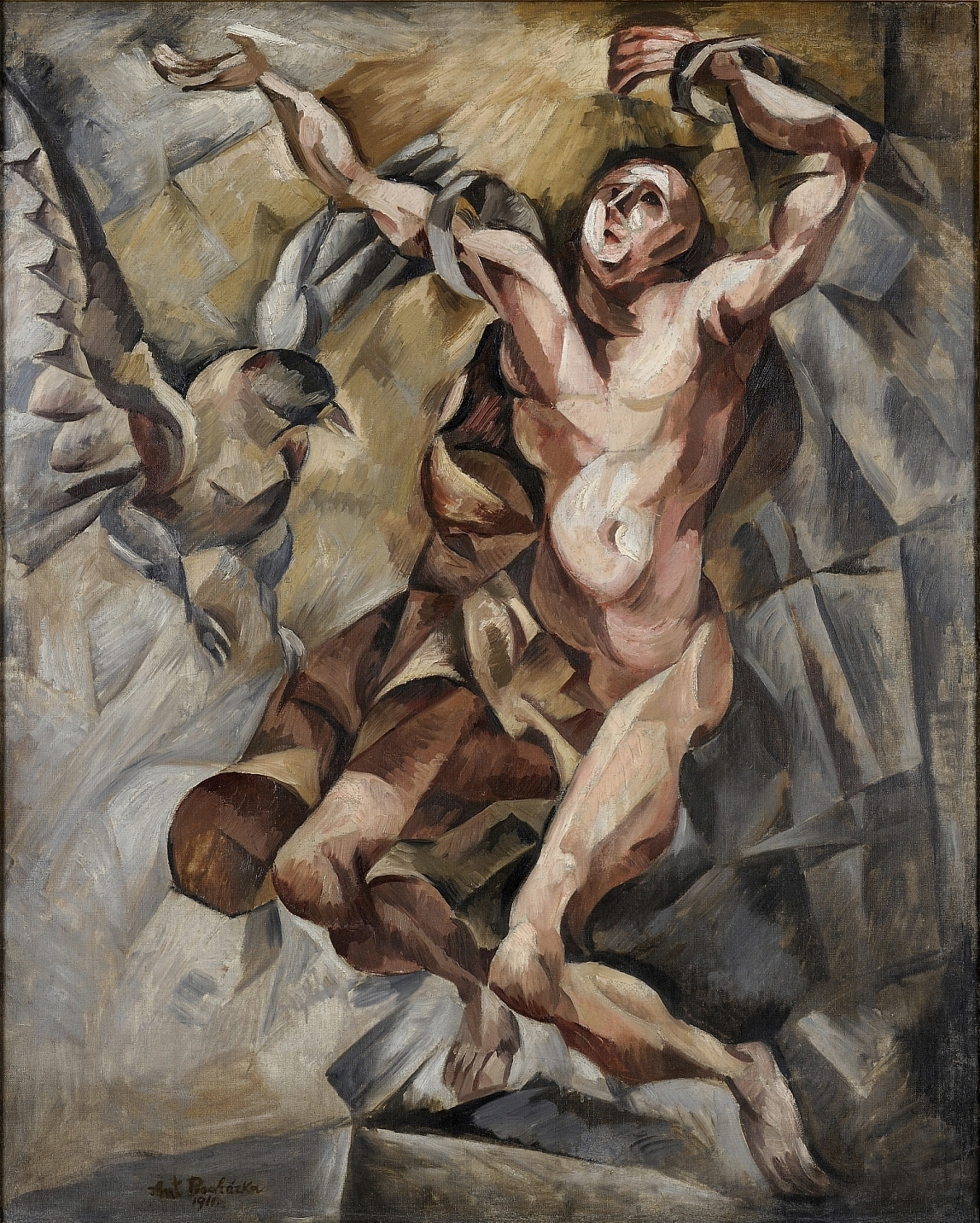
Prometheus (1911)

Apples in the basket - still life, oil on hardboard
