= Bedřich Havránek =

Czech painter (1821–1899)

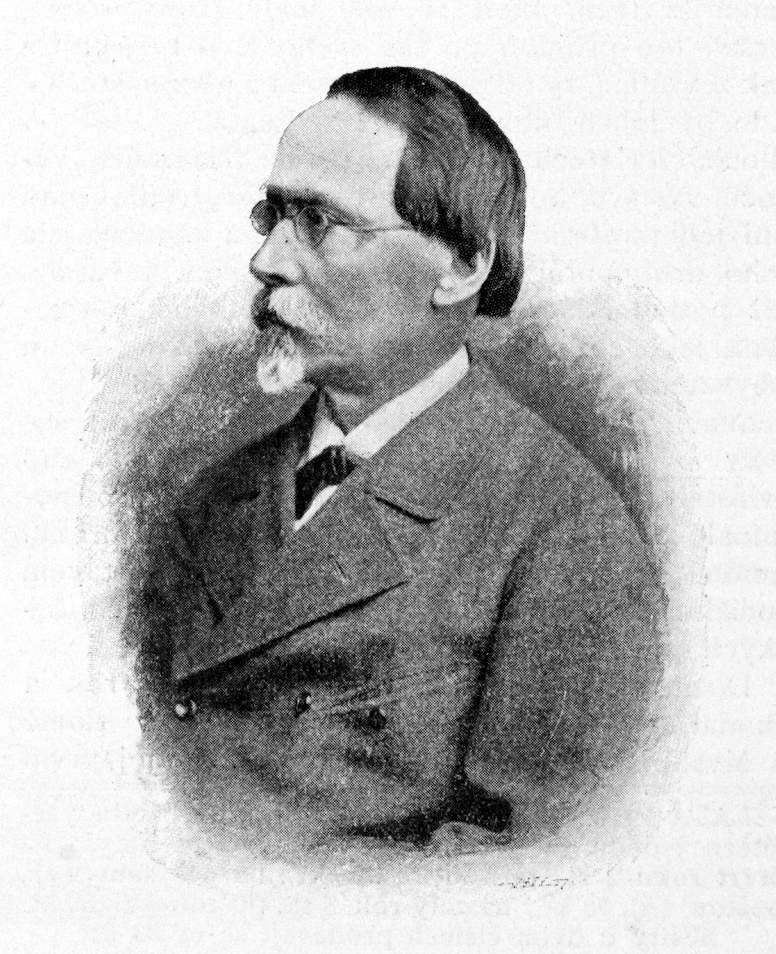
Bedřich Havránek (date unknown)

Bedřich Havránek (German: Friedrich Hawranek; 4 January 1821 – 1 March 1899) was a Czech painter, illustrator and art teacher.

== Biography ==
Havránek was born on 4 January 1821 in Prague. His father was a lawyer who served on the Criminal Council. His mother was the daughter of a Frenchman who settled in Bohemia during the Napoleonic Wars. The environment at home was intellectually-oriented and he received a very good education.

He began his studies at the Academy of Fine Arts in the landscape painting classes of Antonín Mánes. Following Mánes' death, he continued his studies with Christian Ruben and Max Haushofer. After graduating, he toured France, Poland, Germany and England and compiled sketchbooks of his travels.

Upon returning, he settled in Prague, remained unmarried and, financially independent, generally pursued painting as a sort of hobby. He became one of the favorite painters of the Austrian Archduke Ludwig Salvator, who took lessons from him. Even in his old age, he would travel into the countryside to paint en plein aire; always making scrupulous records of the location and time of day. Originally a Romanticist, he drifted away from that style during his last few years.

Havránek died on 1 March 1899 in Prague.

== Selected paintings ==
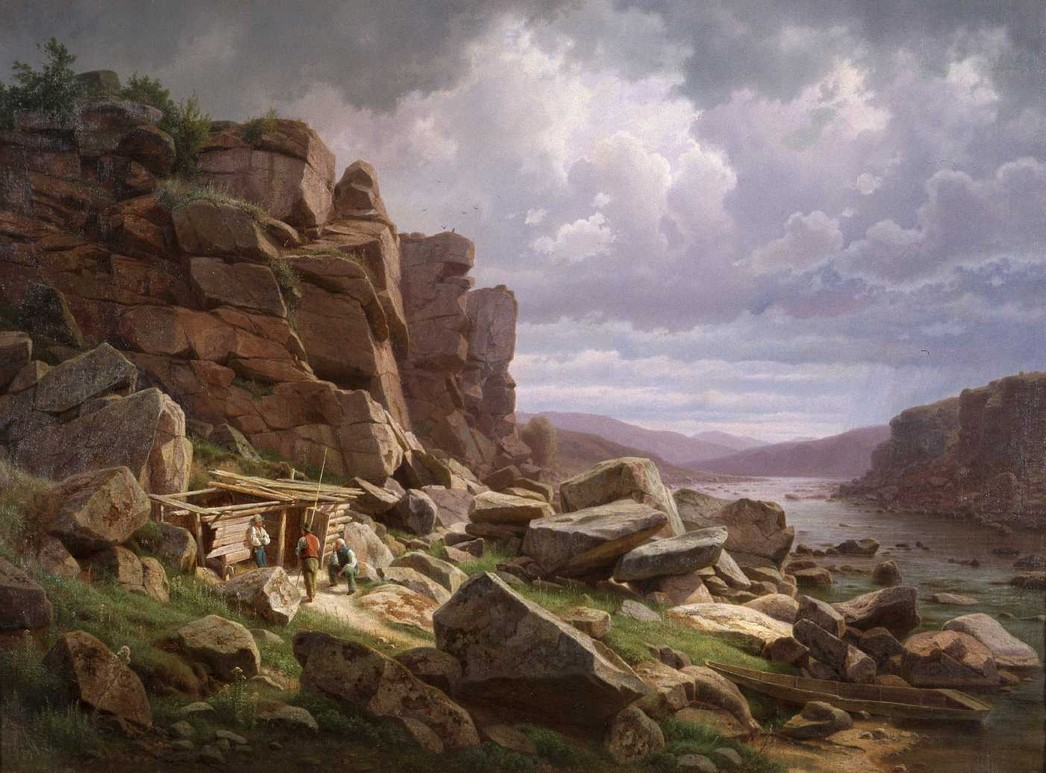
Scene on the Sázava River

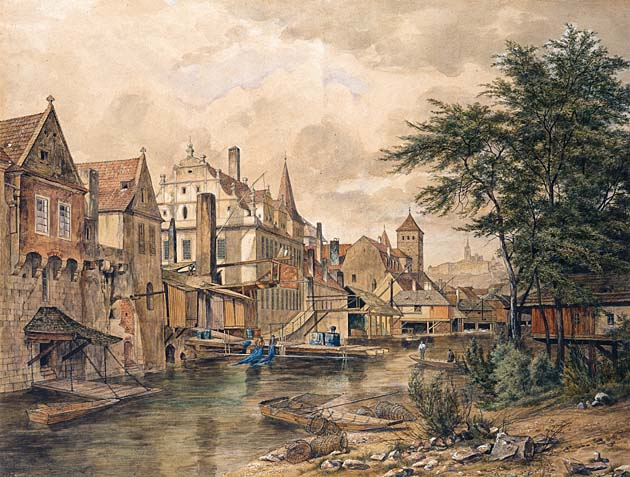
Mills on the Vltava River

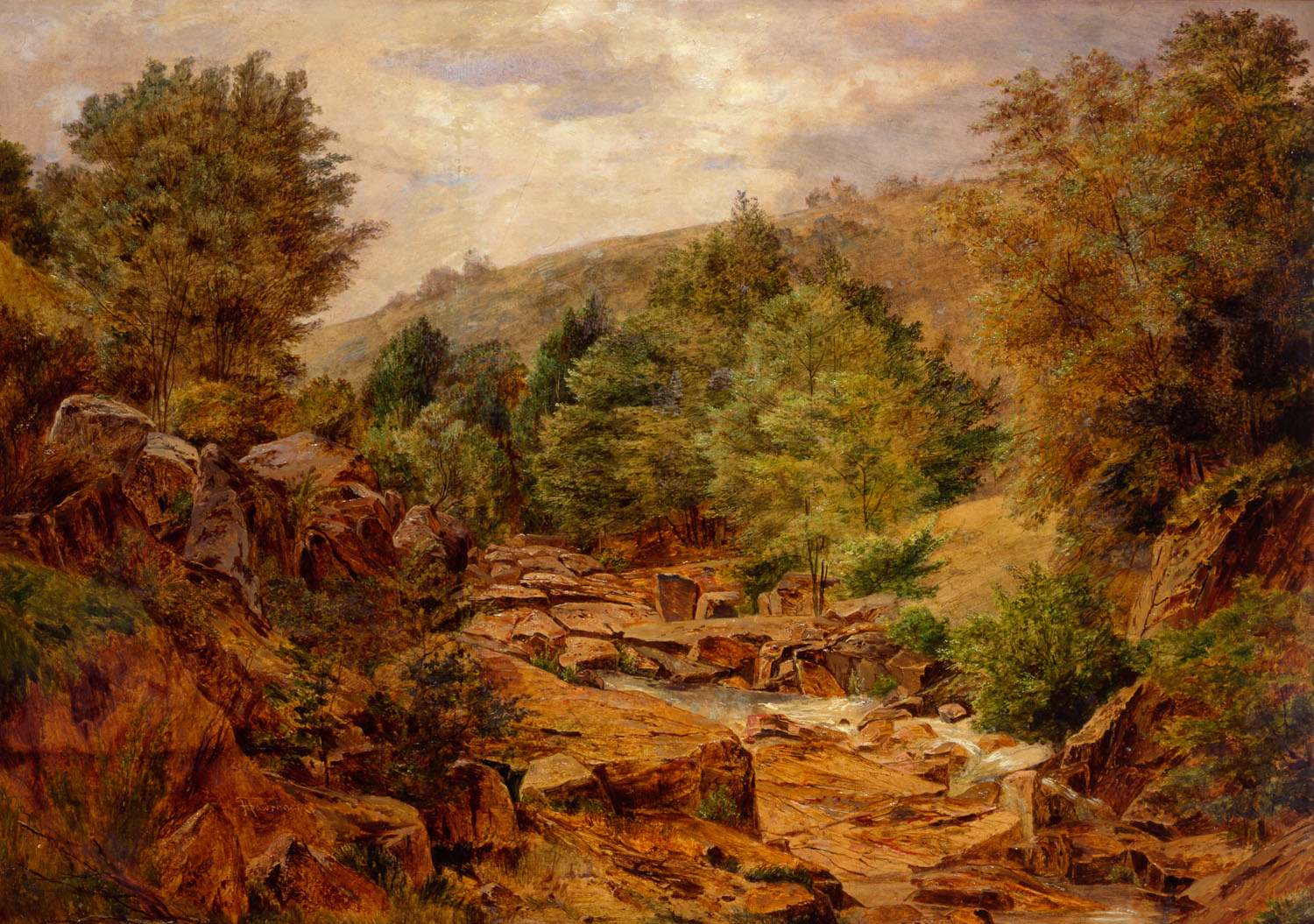
Valley with a Stream

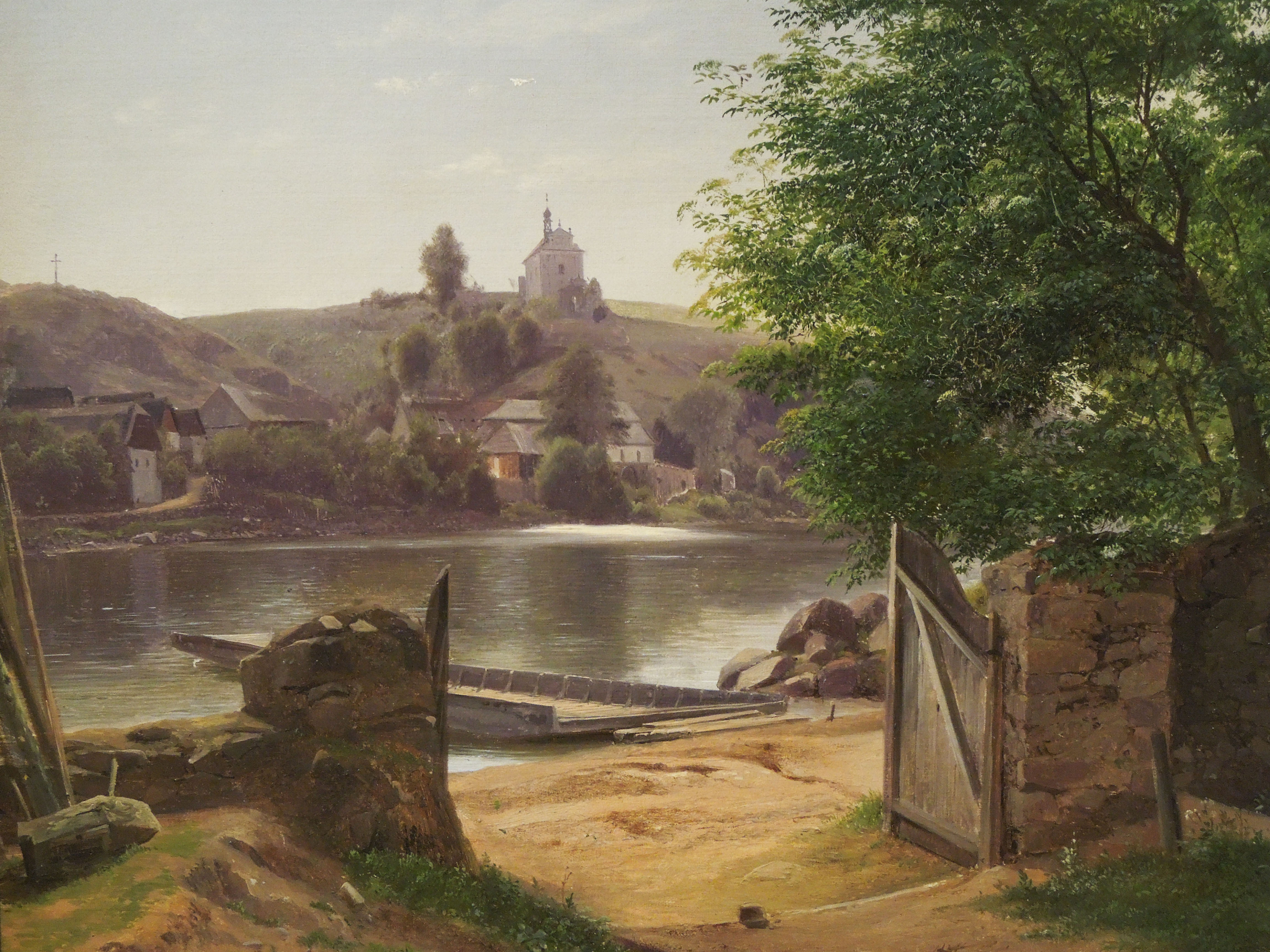
Kamenný Přívoz on the Sázava River

== Sources ==
- Biographical data at abART
