= Bedřich Feigl =

Czech-Jewish painter, graphic designer and illustrator

- Born: March 6, 1884; Prague, Bohemia
- Died: December 17, 1965 (aged 81); London, England

Signature
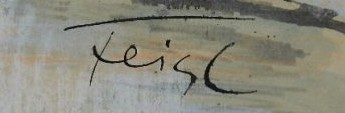

Bedřich Feigl (also known as Friedrich Feigl; 6 March 1884 – 17 December 1965) was a Czech-Jewish painter, graphic designer and illustrator.

== Biography ==
Feigl studied at the Prague Academy of Fine Arts with Vlaho Bukovac and Franz Thiele. In 1906, he travelled through Europe with Emil Filla and Antonín Procházka. In Berlin he became familiar with the art of Max Liebermann. In 1907 he attended the first exhibition in Prague Group Eight. Feigl lived for a long time in Berlin and New York. He fled Prague in 1939 and settled in London, with his wife, where he died in 1965. His works are placed in galleries around the world.

== Bibliography ==
- Bedřich Feigl - Obrazy, kresby a grafika. Praha : Židovské muzeum v Praze, 2007. 72 s. ISBN 978-80-86889-56-6.
