= Bedřichov (Blansko District) =

- Municipality
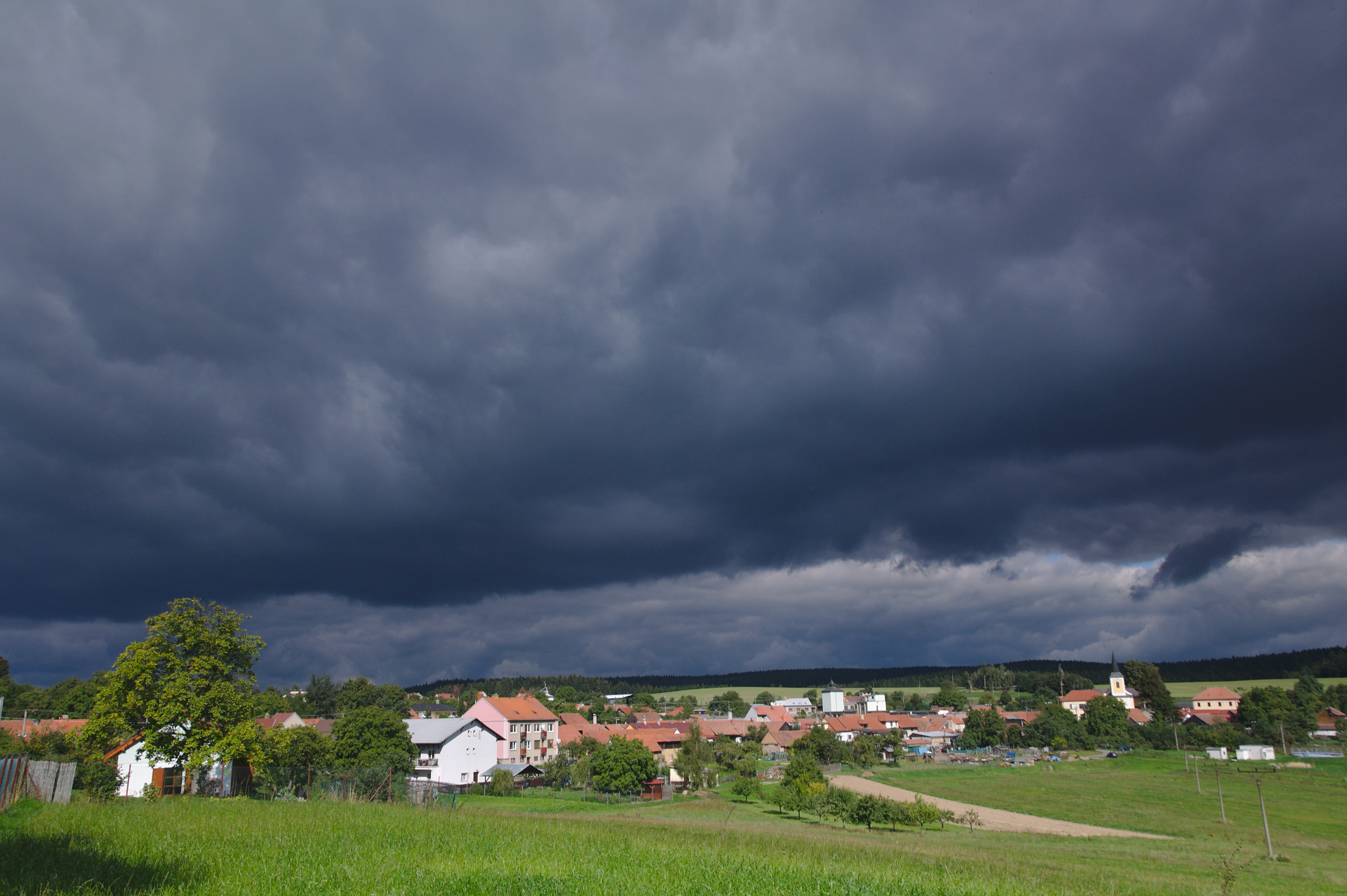
- View from the southeast

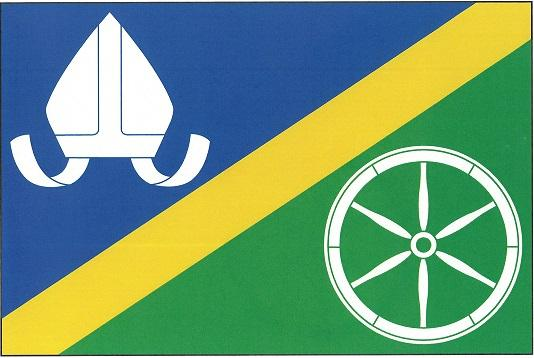
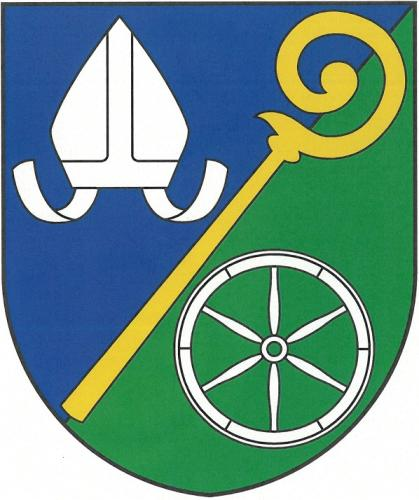
- Flag Coat of arms

- Location in the Czech Republic
- Coordinates: 49°27′40″N 16°27′55″E
- Country: Czech Republic
- Region: South Moravian
- District: Blansko
- First mentioned: 1392

Area
  - Total: 6.28 km^{2} (2.42 sq mi)
- Elevation: 603 m (1,978 ft)

Population (2026-01-01)
  - Total: 260
  - Density: 41/km^{2} (110/sq mi)
- Time zone: UTC+1 (CET)
  - Summer (DST): UTC+2 (CEST)
- Postal code: 679 71
- Website: www.obecbedrichov.cz

Bedřichov (German: Friedrichsfeld) is a municipality and village in Blansko District in the South Moravian Region of the Czech Republic. It has about 300 inhabitants.

== Geography ==
Bedřichov is located about 17 kilometres (11 mi) northwest of Blansko and 29 km (18 mi) north of Brno. It lies in the Upper Svratka Highlands. The highest point is at 656 m (2,152 ft) above sea level.

== History ==
The first written mention of Bedřichov is from 1392.

== Demographics ==
Historical population

| Year | Pop. | ±% |
|---|---|---|
| 1869 | 428 | — |
| 1880 | 433 | +1.2% |
| 1890 | 402 | −7.2% |
| 1900 | 435 | +8.2% |
| 1910 | 441 | +1.4% |

| Year | Pop. | ±% |
|---|---|---|
| 1921 | 417 | −5.4% |
| 1930 | 444 | +6.5% |
| 1950 | 341 | −23.2% |
| 1961 | 344 | +0.9% |
| 1970 | 311 | −9.6% |

| Year | Pop. | ±% |
|---|---|---|
| 1980 | 268 | −13.8% |
| 1991 | 221 | −17.5% |
| 2001 | 248 | +12.2% |
| 2011 | 255 | +2.8% |
| 2021 | 231 | −9.4% |

Source: Censuses

== Transport ==
There are no railways or major roads passing through the municipality.

== Sights ==
The main landmark of Bedřichov is the Church of Saint Nicholas. It was built in the late Baroque style in 1789 and modified in 1850. It was built on the site of a medieval church, which was demolished in 1785.
