= Ray Prohaska =

Montenegrin–American artist (1901–1981)

- Prohaska in 1939
- Born: Gracia Josef Prohaska; February 5, 1901; Muo, Kingdom of Dalmatia (now Montenegro)
- Died: October 7, 1981 (aged 80); East Hampton, New York, US
- Known for: Magazine illustrations

Raymond Joseph Prohaska (born Gracia Josef Prohaska; February 5, 1901 – October 7, 1981) was a Montenegro-born American artist who had a lengthy, successful career as a magazine illustrator. Prohaska relocated to San Francisco in 1909 and studied at the San Francisco School of Fine Arts. After traveling North America and working as a freelance illustrator, Prohaska settled in New York, where he worked for magazines such as Collier's and The Saturday Evening Post. He received numerous awards for his works and was inducted to the Society of Illustrators' Hall of Fame in 1972.

== Biography ==
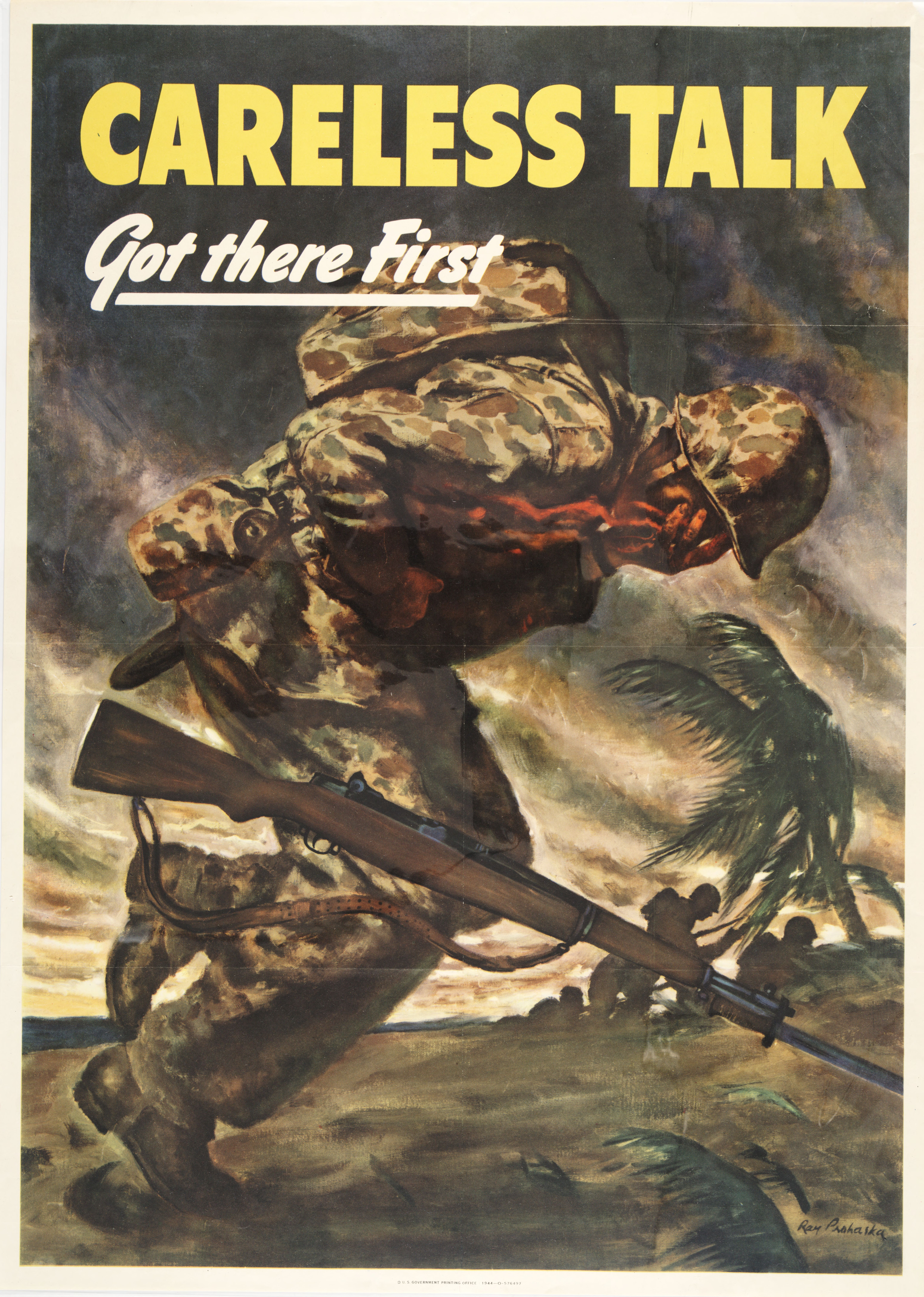
1944 poster by Prohaska

Prohaska was born Gracia Josef Prohaska in Muo, Kingdom of Dalmatia (Austria-Hungary), in 1901. His father was an officer in the Austro-Hungarian Army and a shoemaker. In 1909, the Prohaskas moved to San Francisco. Prohaska displayed an early propensity for art; his father beat him to dissuade him from becoming an artist, but his mother encouraged him to continue. As an adolescent, Prohaska studied at the San Francisco School of Fine Arts and worked as a logger during the summers. During the 1920s, he moved around the western United States, Canada, and Chicago while working as a freelance illustrator.

He left Chicago and settled in New York City in 1930. There, he began receiving work as an illustrator for magazines such as Collier's, The Saturday Evening Post, The Delineator, and Good Housekeeping. Prohaska was a highly sought-after and popular artist due to his skill and versatility and enjoyed success throughout his lengthy career. In addition to his work for magazines, he also produced portraits and marine paintings; Prohaska was an avid fisherman and much of his work was inspired by his time on the beach and near the sea. He married Carolyn Pierson and had three children: Raymond, Anton, and Elena.

Prohaska was also a decorated painter; for his works, he was awarded the Hallmark Award in 1949, the Audubon Medal in 1954, the M. Grumbacher First Prize in 1958, the John Marin Memorial Award in 1962, and the Society of Illustrators' Gold Medal in 1963. He instructed at the Art Students League of New York from 1961 to 1963 and was the artist-in-residence at Washington and Lee University and Wake Forest University for five years each. He also served as the president of the Society of Illustrators in 1959 and 1960 and was inducted into their Hall of Fame in 1972.

Prohaska died in his home in East Hampton on October 7, 1981, at the age of 80.
