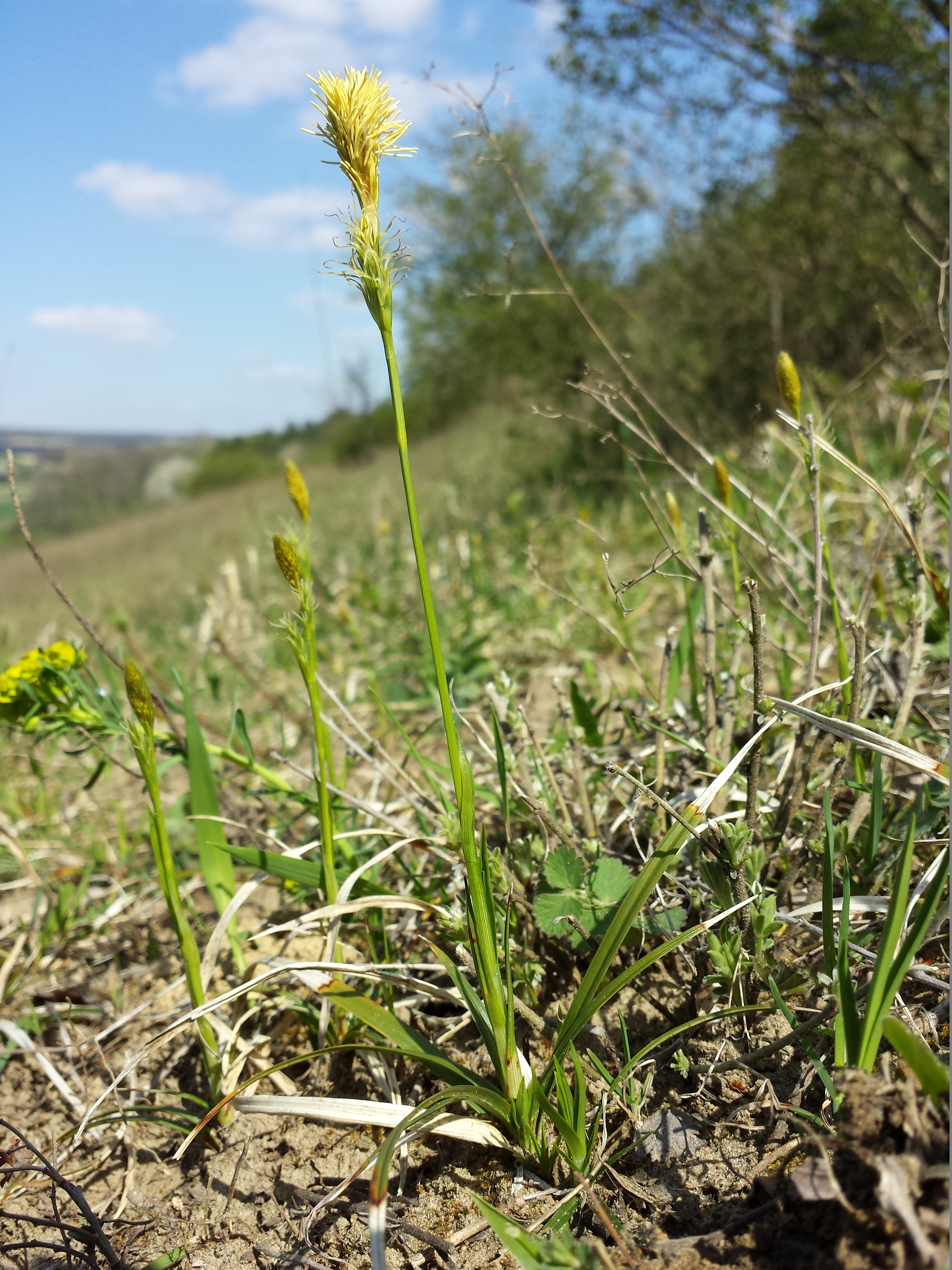
- In Austria
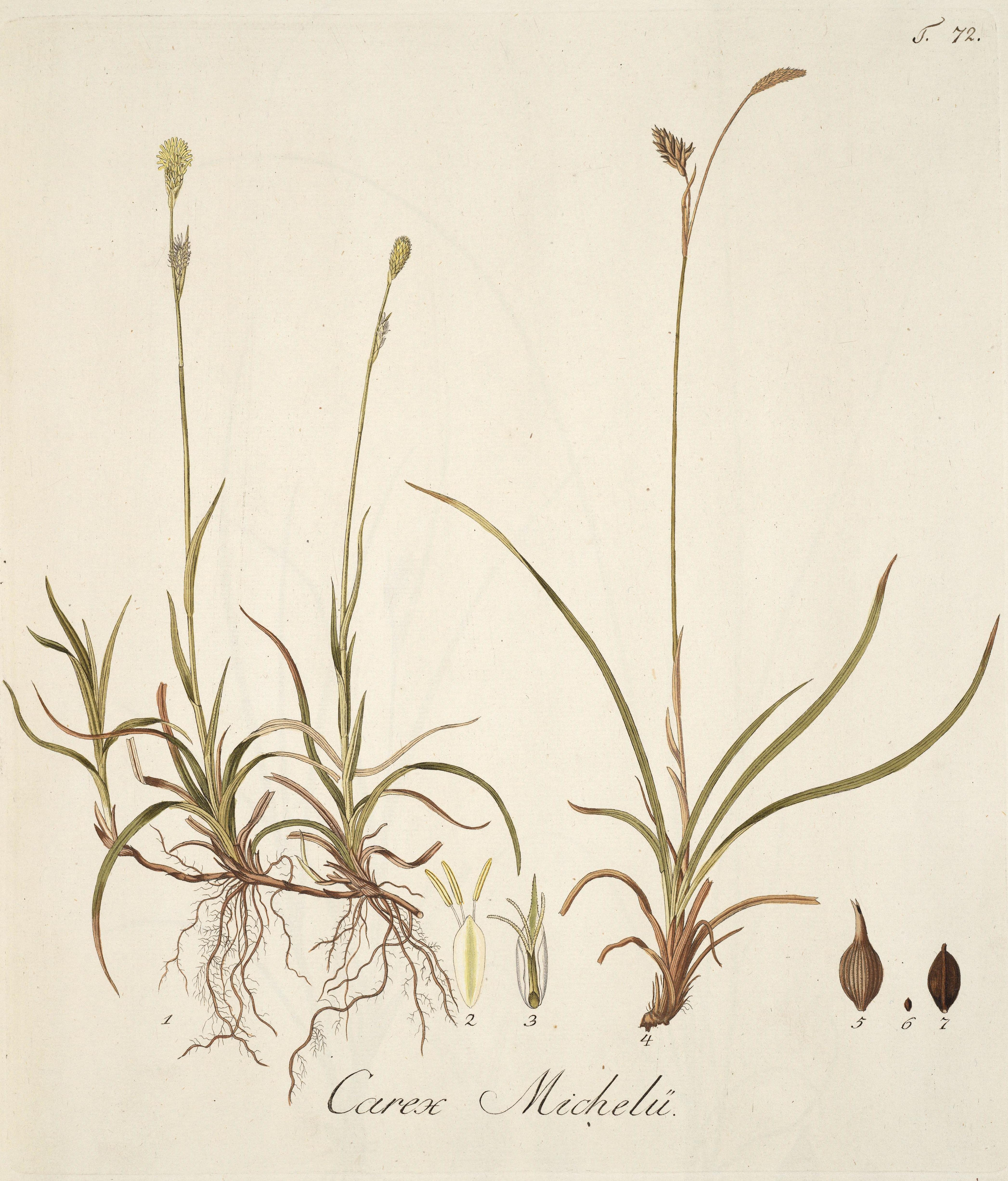
- Botanical illustration

Scientific classification
- Kingdom: Plantae
- Clade: Tracheophytes
- Clade: Angiosperms
- Clade: Monocots
- Clade: Commelinids
- Order: Poales
- Family: Cyperaceae
- Genus: Carex
- Species: C. michelii

Binomial name
- Carex michelii Host

Synonyms
- Carex ampullacea Wulfen ex Wahlenb.; Carex beckeri C.A.Mey. ex Claus; Carex vexilis Wormsk. ex Boott

= Carex michelii =

Species of grass-like plant

Carex michelii is a species of sedge (family Cyperaceae), native to central, southern and eastern Europe, Turkey, the Caucasus, and Iran. It is typically found in semi‑arid grasslands.
