= Nepoměřice =

- Municipality
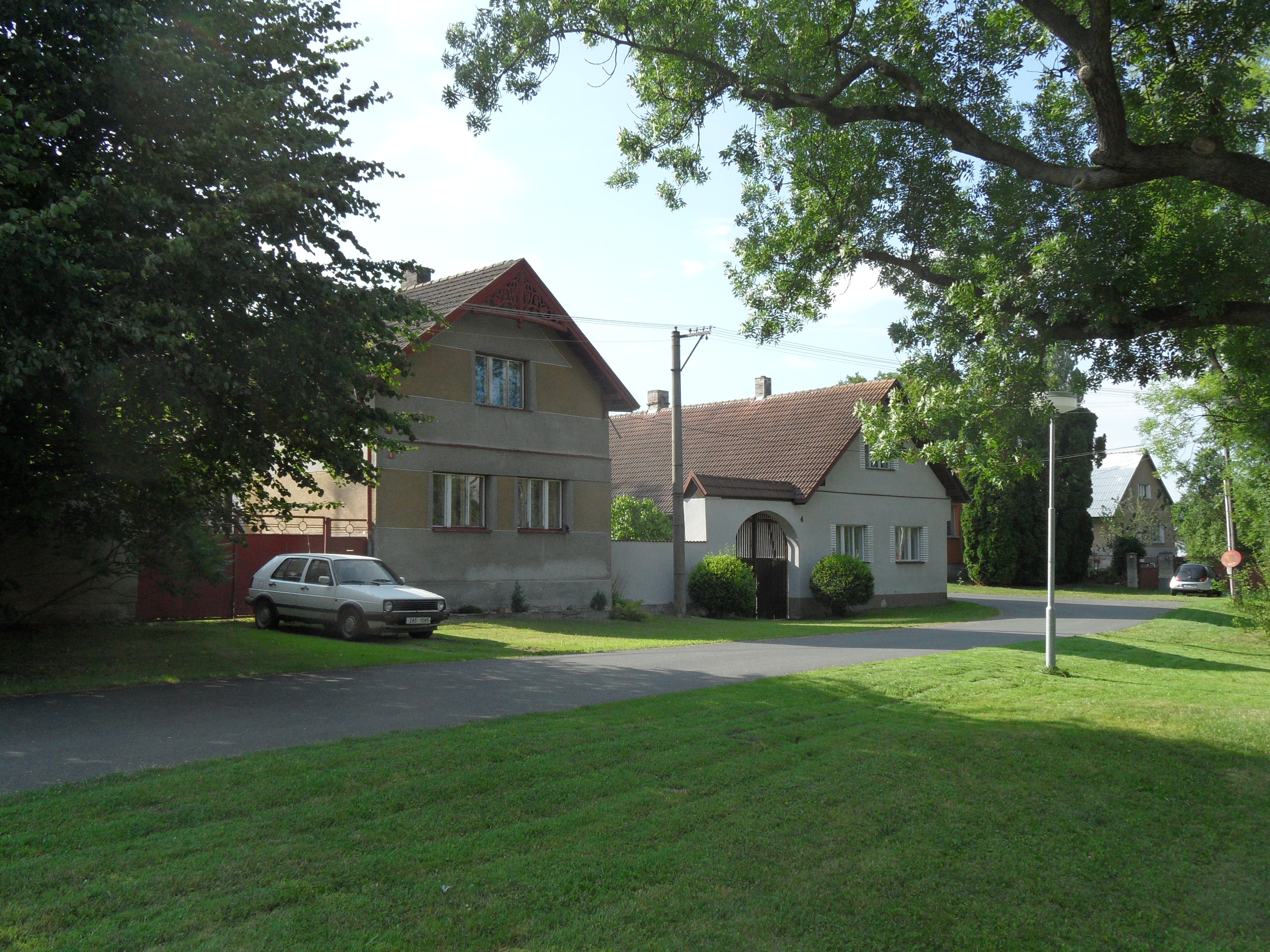
- Centre of Nepoměřice

- Location in the Czech Republic
- Coordinates: 49°52′51″N 15°8′56″E
- Country: Czech Republic
- Region: Central Bohemian
- District: Kutná Hora
- First mentioned: 1287

Area
  - Total: 7.21 km^{2} (2.78 sq mi)
- Elevation: 455 m (1,493 ft)

Population (2026-01-01)
  - Total: 212
  - Density: 29.4/km^{2} (76.2/sq mi)
- Time zone: UTC+1 (CET)
  - Summer (DST): UTC+2 (CEST)
- Postal code: 285 11
- Website: www.nepomerice.cz

Nepoměřice is a municipality and village in Kutná Hora District in the Central Bohemian Region of the Czech Republic. It has about 200 inhabitants.

== Administrative division ==
Nepoměřice consists of three municipal parts (in brackets population according to the 2021 census):

- Nepoměřice (158)
- Bedřichov (11)
- Miletice (33)

== Demographics ==
Historical population
Year	Pop.	±%
1869	498	—
1880	528	+6.0%
1890	478	−9.5%
1900	449	−6.1%
1910	453	+0.9%
1921	436	−3.8%
1930	413	−5.3%
1950	279	−32.4%
1961	260	−6.8%
1970	226	−13.1%
1980	241	+6.6%
1991	238	−1.2%
2001	212	−10.9%
2011	209	−1.4%
2021	202	−3.3%
Source: Censuses
