= Vážany (Blansko District) =

- Municipality
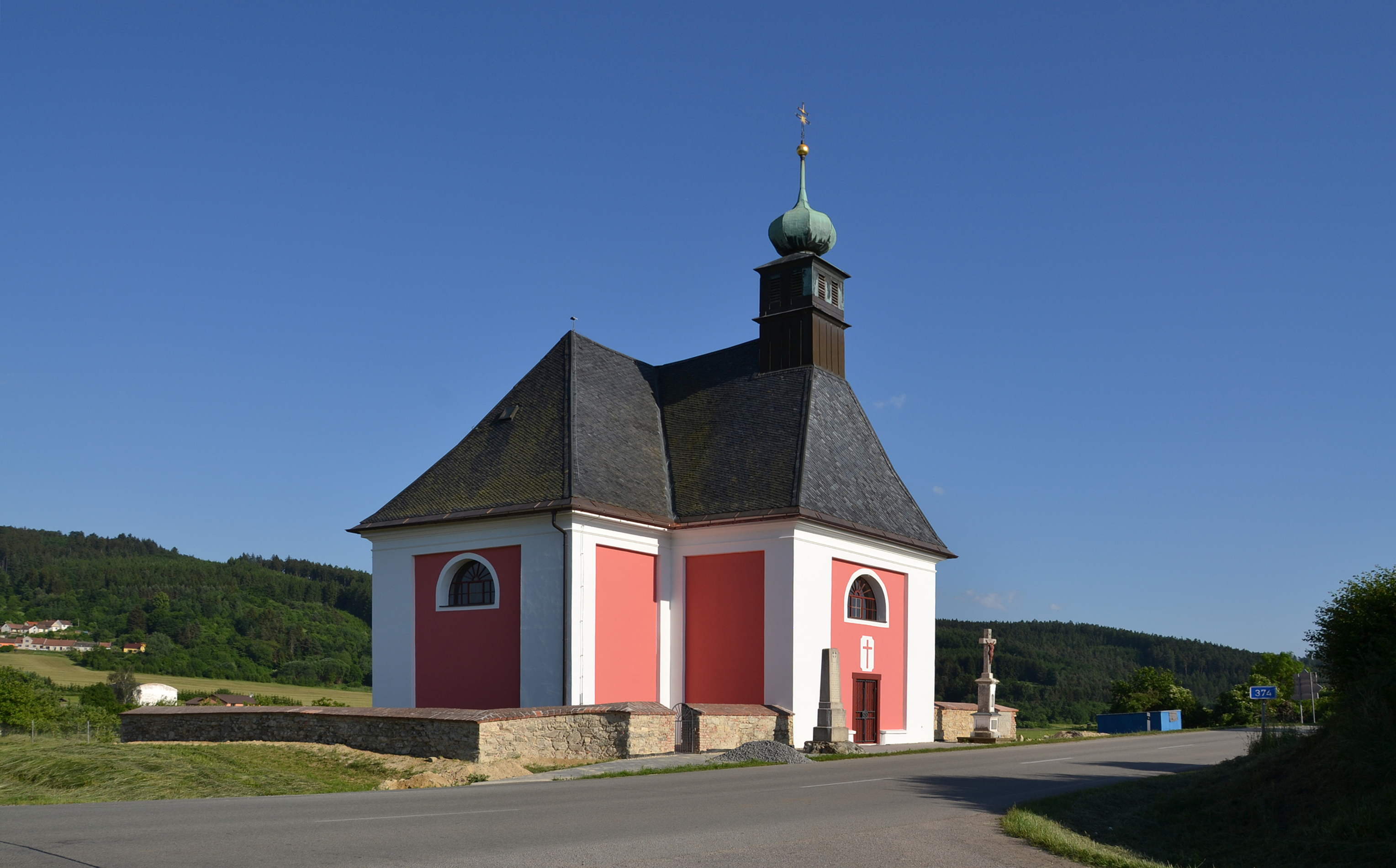
- Church of the Annunciation of the Virgin Mary

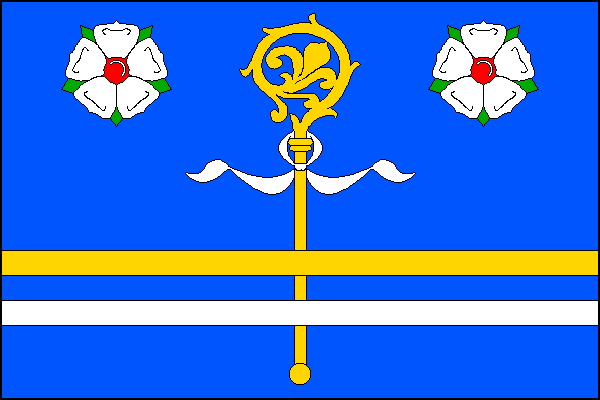
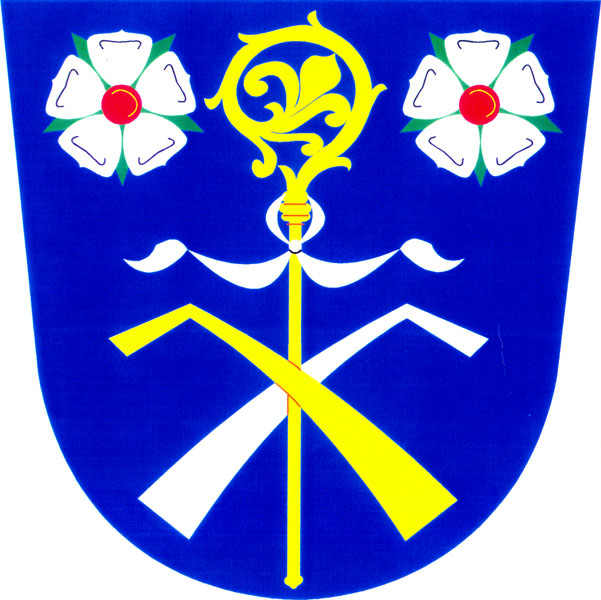
- Flag Coat of arms

- Location in the Czech Republic
- Coordinates: 49°31′52″N 16°41′19″E
- Country: Czech Republic
- Region: South Moravian
- District: Blansko
- First mentioned: 1167

Area
  - Total: 4.84 km^{2} (1.87 sq mi)
- Elevation: 368 m (1,207 ft)

Population (2026-01-01)
  - Total: 249
  - Density: 51.4/km^{2} (133/sq mi)
- Time zone: UTC+1 (CET)
  - Summer (DST): UTC+2 (CEST)
- Postal code: 680 01
- Website: vazany.cz

Vážany (German: Waschan) is a municipality and village in Blansko District in the South Moravian Region of the Czech Republic. It has about 200 inhabitants.

Vážany lies approximately 18 kilometres (11 mi) north of Blansko, 37 km (23 mi) north of Brno, and 176 km (109 mi) east of Prague.

== Demographics ==
Historical population
Year	Pop.	±%
1869	310	—
1880	327	+5.5%
1890	264	−19.3%
1900	325	+23.1%
1910	355	+9.2%
1921	328	−7.6%
1930	334	+1.8%
1950	297	−11.1%
1961	324	+9.1%
1970	275	−15.1%
1980	230	−16.4%
1991	189	−17.8%
2001	191	+1.1%
2011	218	+14.1%
2021	244	+11.9%
Source: Censuses
