= Vážany (Vyškov District) =

- Municipality
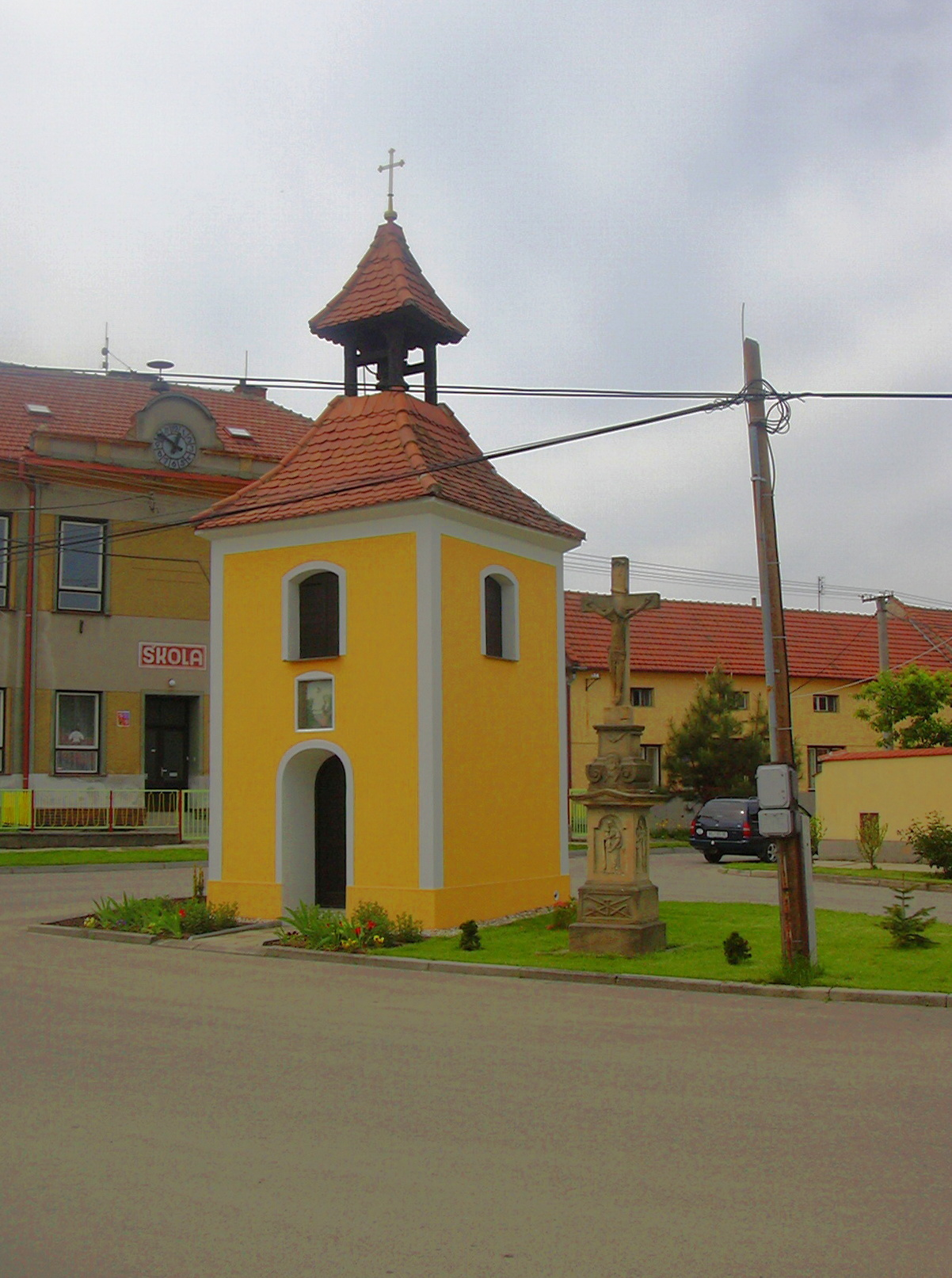
- Belfry

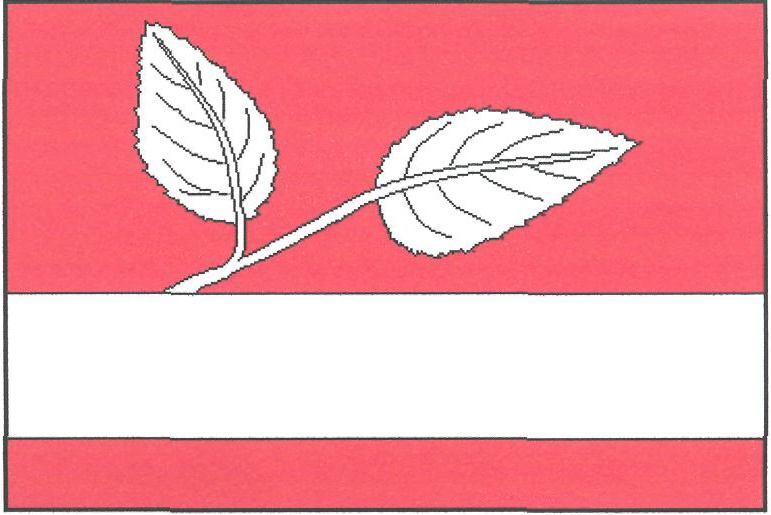
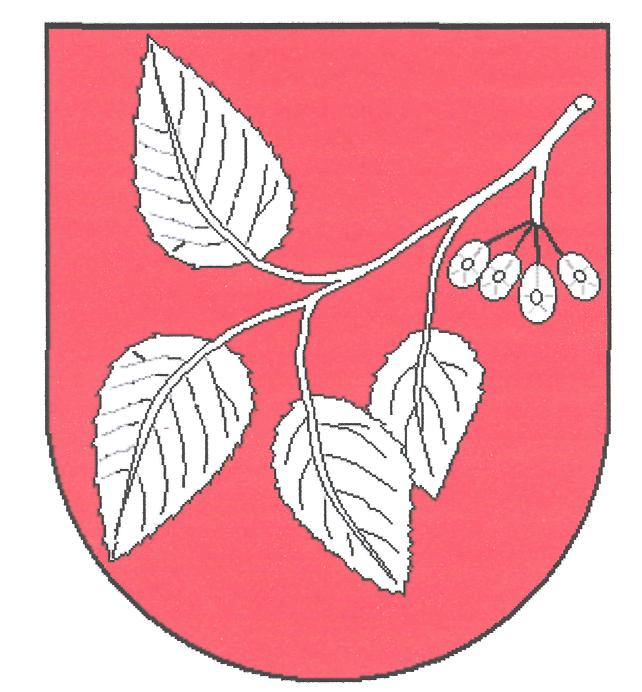
- Flag Coat of arms

- Location in the Czech Republic
- Coordinates: 49°14′40″N 17°3′0″E
- Country: Czech Republic
- Region: South Moravian
- District: Vyškov
- First mentioned: 1348

Area
  - Total: 5.44 km^{2} (2.10 sq mi)
- Elevation: 280 m (920 ft)

Population (2026-01-01)
  - Total: 427
  - Density: 78.5/km^{2} (203/sq mi)
- Time zone: UTC+1 (CET)
  - Summer (DST): UTC+2 (CEST)
- Postal code: 682 01
- Website: www.vazanyvy.cz

Vážany is a municipality and village in Vyškov District in the South Moravian Region of the Czech Republic. It has about 400 inhabitants.

Vážany lies approximately 6 kilometres (4 mi) south-east of Vyškov, 32 km (20 mi) east of Brno, and 212 km (132 mi) south-east of Prague.

== Demographics ==
Historical population
| Year | Pop. | ±% |
|---|---|---|
| 1869 | 552 | — |
| 1880 | 550 | −0.4% |
| 1890 | 558 | +1.5% |
| 1900 | 677 | +21.3% |
| 1910 | 743 | +9.7% |
| 1921 | 689 | −7.3% |
| 1930 | 713 | +3.5% |
| 1950 | 609 | −14.6% |
| 1961 | 647 | +6.2% |
| 1970 | 539 | −16.7% |
| 1980 | 487 | −9.6% |
| 1991 | 436 | −10.5% |
| 2001 | 415 | −4.8% |
| 2011 | 428 | +3.1% |
| 2021 | 432 | +0.9% |
Source: Censuses

== Notable people ==
- Antonín Procházka (1882–1945), painter
