= Červenka (Olomouc District) =

- Municipality
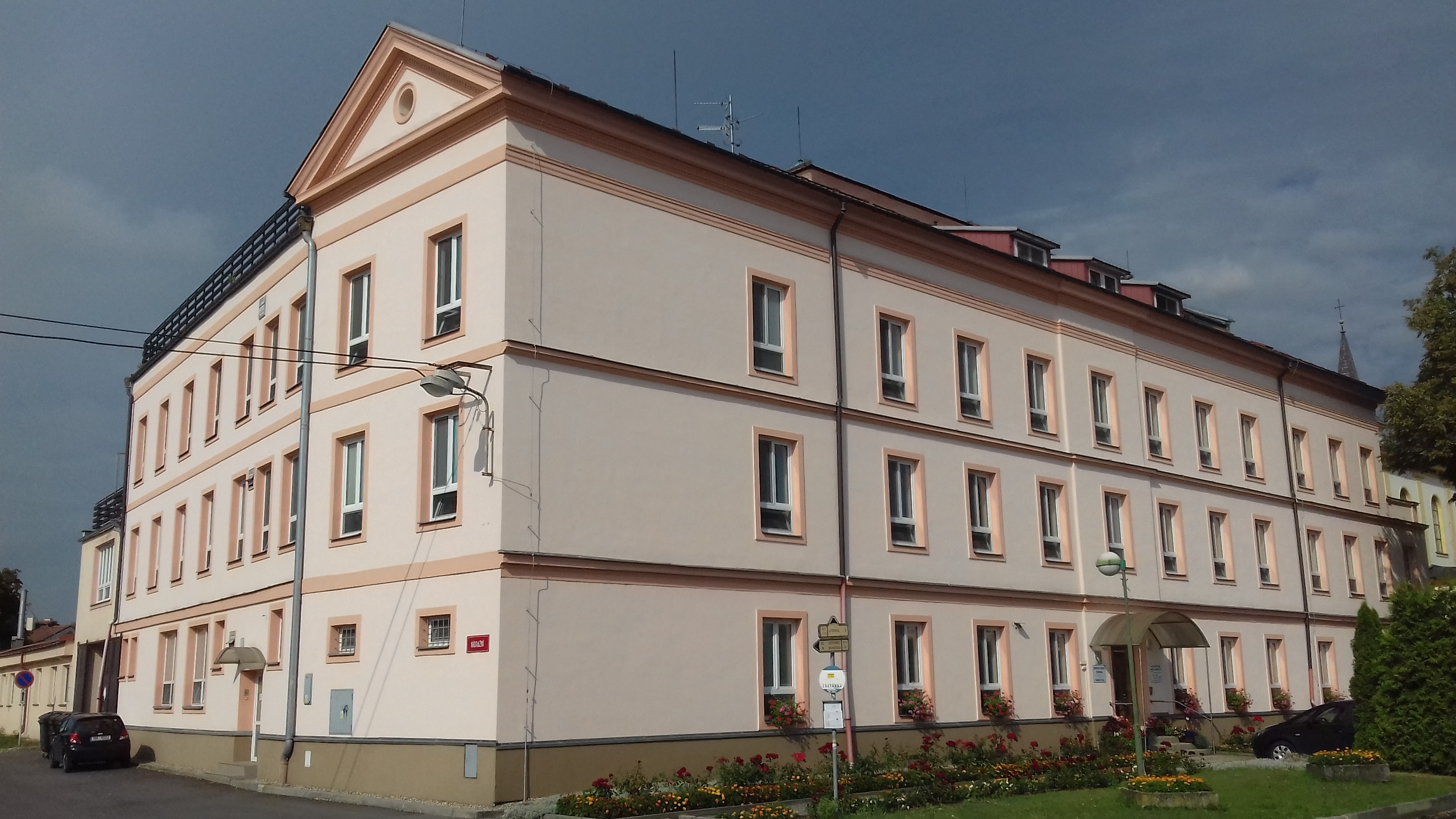
- Červenka Castle, today a retirement home

- Flag Coat of arms

- Location in the Czech Republic
- Coordinates: 49°43′8″N 17°5′1″E
- Country: Czech Republic
- Region: Olomouc
- District: Olomouc
- First mentioned: 1287

Area
  - Total: 11.30 km^{2} (4.36 sq mi)
- Elevation: 236 m (774 ft)

Population (2026-01-01)
  - Total: 1,468
  - Density: 129.9/km^{2} (336.5/sq mi)
- Time zone: UTC+1 (CET)
  - Summer (DST): UTC+2 (CEST)
- Postal code: 784 01
- Website: www.obeccervenka.cz

Červenka (German: Schwarzbach bei Olmütz) is a municipality and village in Olomouc District in the Olomouc Region of the Czech Republic. It has about 1,500 inhabitants.

Červenka lies approximately 19 kilometres (12 mi) north-west of Olomouc and 196 km (122 mi) east of Prague.

== Demographics ==
Historical population
Year	Pop.	±%
1869	621	—
1880	693	+11.6%
1890	773	+11.5%
1900	872	+12.8%
1910	988	+13.3%
1921	979	−0.9%
1930	958	−2.1%
1950	859	−10.3%
1961	1,144	+33.2%
1970	1,152	+0.7%
1980	1,270	+10.2%
1991	1,257	−1.0%
2001	1,314	+4.5%
2011	1,437	+9.4%
2021	1,490	+3.7%
Source: Censuses

== Notable people ==
- Jaroslav Svoboda (born 1980), ice hockey player
