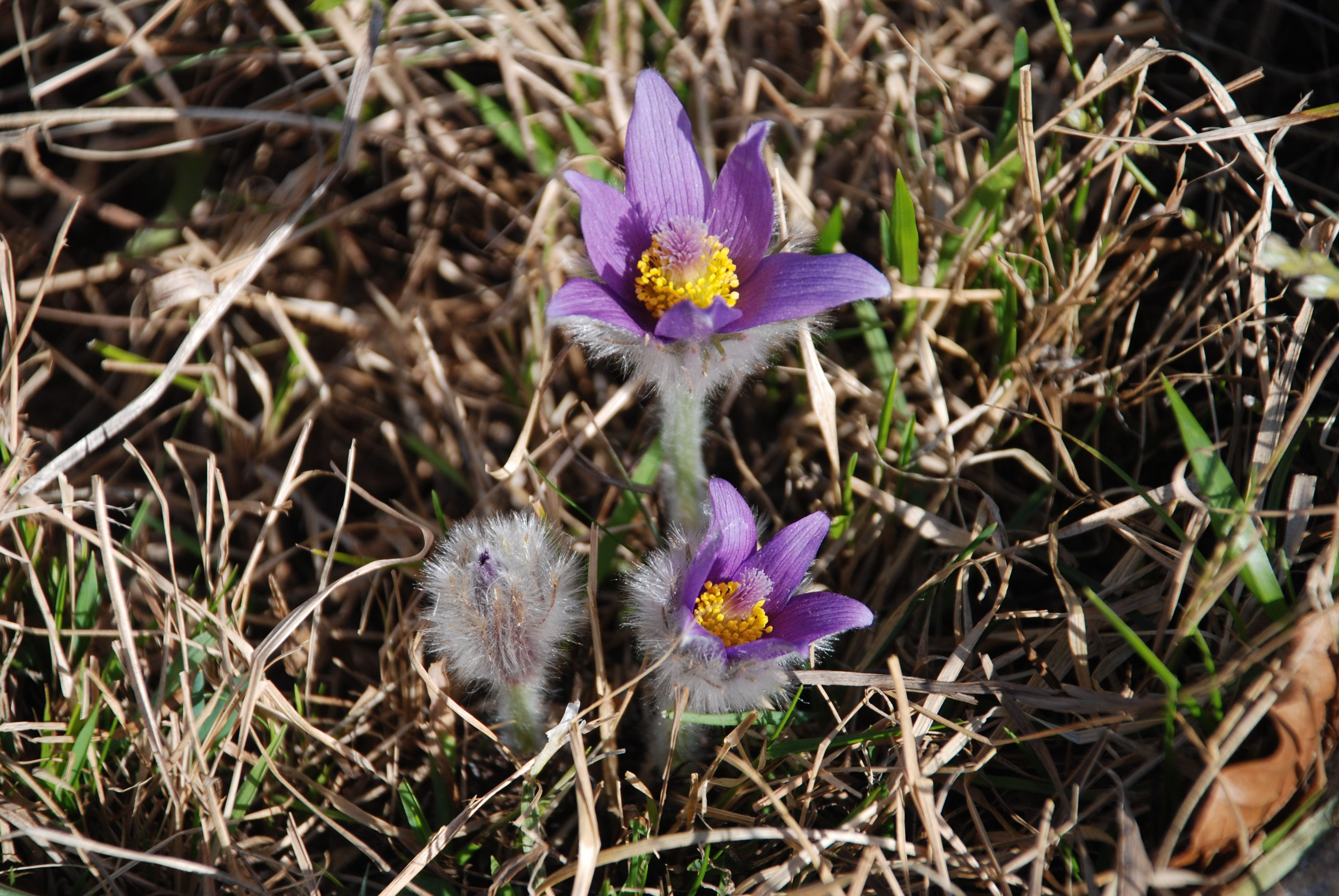
- Pulsatilla grandis under Mt. Boč, Slovenia

Conservation status
- Least Concern (IUCN 3.1)

Scientific classification
- Kingdom: Plantae
- Clade: Tracheophytes
- Clade: Angiosperms
- Clade: Eudicots
- Order: Ranunculales
- Family: Ranunculaceae
- Genus: Pulsatilla
- Species: P. grandis

Binomial name
- Pulsatilla grandis (Wender., 1830)

= Pulsatilla grandis =

Species of plant

Pulsatilla grandis, commonly known as the greater pasque flower, is a species of flowering plant in the genus Pulsatilla of the family Ranunculaceae. This perennial herbaceous plant reaches heights between 5 and 30 centimetres, featuring finely divided basal leaves and erect, violet flowers densely covered in silky hairs. Native to central Europe, it has a distribution spanning from Great Britain and western France eastward to Ukraine, occupying diverse habitats primarily within the broadleaved forest zone. The species grows predominantly on steppe-like hillsides and meadow slopes, often favouring southern exposures. In Slovenia, it is rare, protected, and serves as both a regional symbol and a heraldic element in local iconography.

== Description ==
Pulsatilla grandis is a perennial herbaceous plant reaching heights of between 5 and 30 centimetres. It has upright stems emerging from a basal cluster of leaves, which themselves are attached to the stem by long stalks. These basal leaves are finely divided, branching two to four times into narrower leaflets with deeply incised (notched) margins. The flowers, which stand erect, have a funnel-like shape with broadly elliptical petals typically coloured violet, and are densely covered in fine, silky hairs. After flowering, the plant produces dry, single-seeded fruits known as achenes. Flower colour in this species is quite variable, showing a range of violet shades.

== Habitat and distribution ==
Pulsatilla grandis occupies diverse habitats primarily within central Europe, extending across Great Britain, western France, Belgium, the Netherlands, Sweden, Austria, Switzerland, Germany, Poland, Hungary, Moldova, Romania, and reaching the eastern limit of its range in Ukraine. Within Ukraine, its distribution is largely diffuse, with populations scattered primarily through the regions of Podilia, the Pre-Carpathians, occasionally in the Right-Bank Forest-Steppe, and infrequently in the Left-Bank Steppe.

In Ukraine, Pulsatilla grandis predominantly favours habitats within the zone of broadleaved forests, where the highest concentration of locations—48 distinct sites—has been documented. Within these areas, it occupies primarily southern and south-eastern slopes of steppe-like hillsides. Specific physical-geographical regions include Male Polissya, Roztochia-Opillia hills, West Podollia Upland, and the Prut–Dniester Upland. The species has experienced considerable habitat reduction across these territories, with some historically documented sites now extinct, particularly near larger cities or settlements, likely due to anthropogenic pressures.

In the forest-steppe belt, populations are fragmented, identified across several highland areas such as the North-western and North-eastern Prydniprovia, the Kyiv highland, and central Transnistria, with plants typically restricted to rocky, steep, and granite-exposed southern slopes. Many locations recorded historically no longer support existing populations, further underscoring the species' vulnerability. The steppe region harbours fewer localities, where it has historically been found in the Oril–Samara and Pryazovia lowlands. However, current populations here have markedly declined or disappeared altogether due to anthropogenic impact, including afforestation and land-use changes associated with military training grounds.

In the Pre-Carpathians, Pulsatilla grandis has a pronounced affinity for meadow-steppe slopes and forest clearings. The species was first documented in this area from herbarium collections made in the 19th century, and though several historic localities have been lost or not recently confirmed, this region continues to support several populations, primarily in the Bukovinian Pre-Carpathians. Anthropogenic factors such as grazing, land cultivation, and the collection of flowers have led to observable declines in these areas as well.

In Slovenia, Pulsatilla grandis (named velikonočnica, the Easter flower) is a rare and protected plant. It has four growing places in the country all of them situated in the sub-Pannonian phytogeographical area in the northeastern part of Slovenia. The plant is the symbol of the Boč–Donatus Mountain Landscape Park. On a small rise near the Boč growing place, a stone sculpture of the flower, created by the sculptor Franc Tobias from Razvanje, has been on display since the 2000s. Pulsatilla grandis is also depicted in the coat of arms of the Diocese of Celje.
