= Bedřich Procházka =

Czech mathematician and educator (1855–1934)

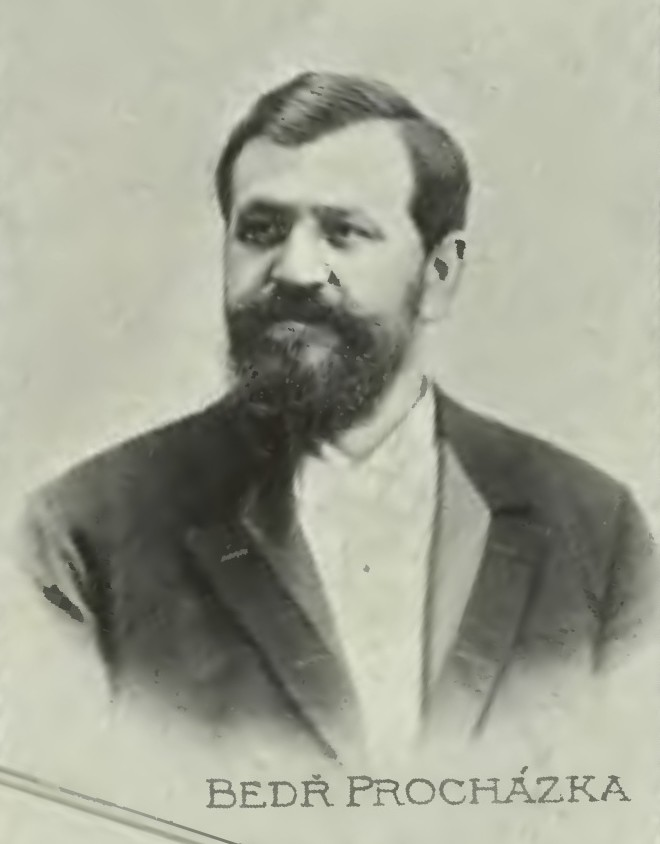
Bedřich Procházka in 1899

Bedřich Procházka (4 July 1855 in Rakovník – 3 January 1934 in Prague) was a Czech mathematician. He was granted an honorary doctorate from the Czech Technical University in Prague in 1925.
