= Schnirch =

Schnirch is a surname. Notable people with the surname include:

- Bedřich Schnirch (1791–1868), Czech engineer
- Bohuslav Schnirch (1845–1901), Czech sculptor, designer, and preservationist
- Oskar Schnirch (1902–1995), Austrian cinematographer
