= Božena (Křesinová) =

11th-century Bohemian duchess

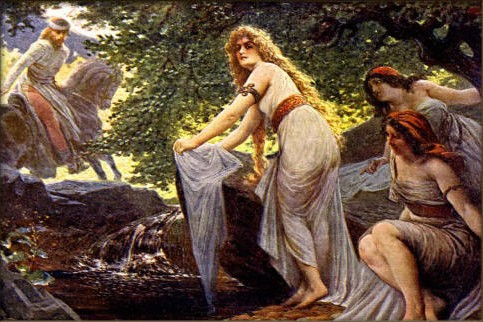
- Oldřich first meets Božena, painting by Adolf Liebscher
- Died: after 1052
- Spouse: Oldřich of Bohemia
- Issue: Bretislaus I of Bohemia
- Father: Křesina

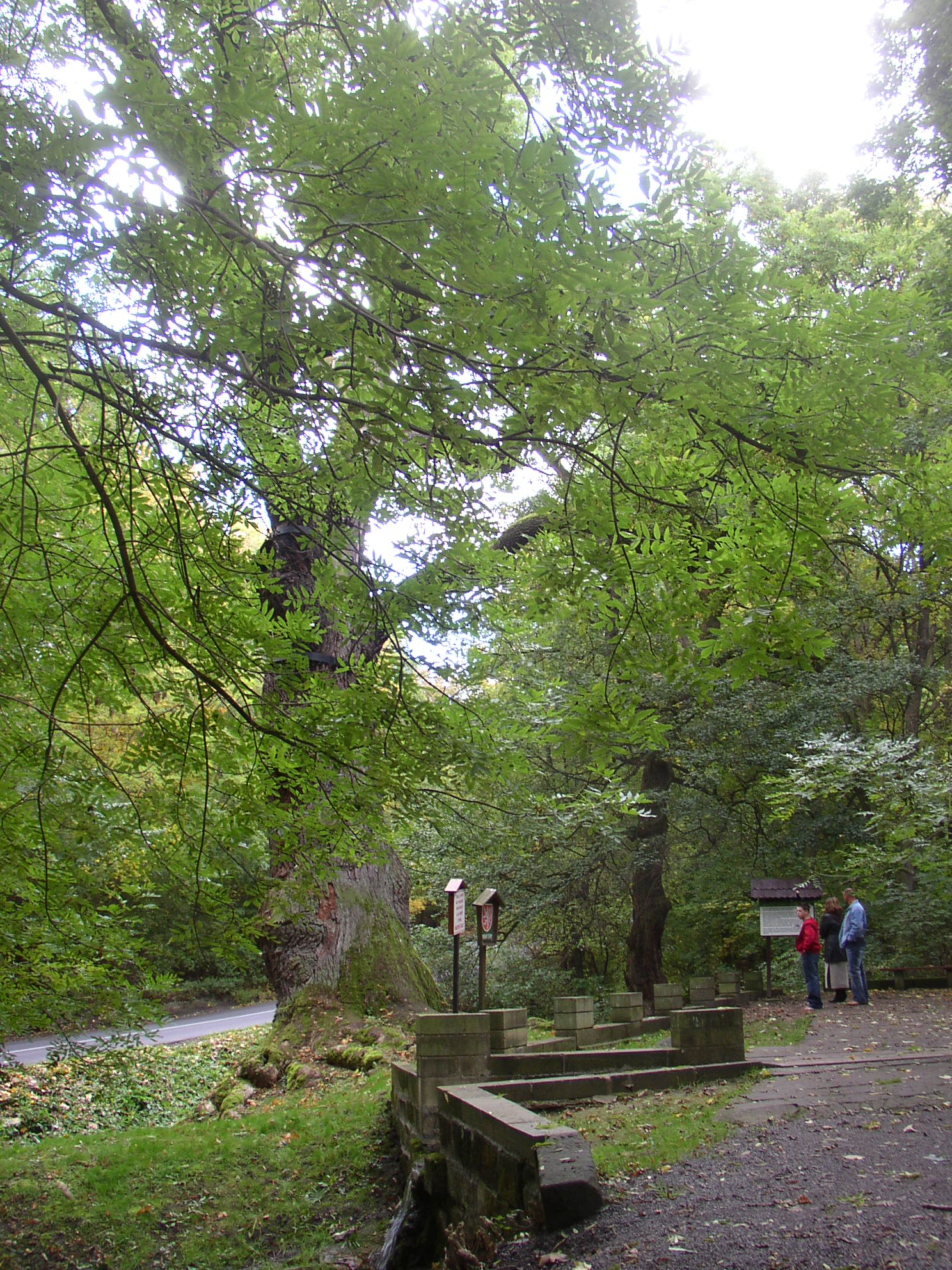
Oldřich Oak in Peruc, where Oldřich and Božena probably met.

Božena (Křesinová) (died after 1052) was the second wife (and probably earlier the mistress) of Duke Oldřich of Bohemia and mother of Bretislaus I of Bohemia.

== Meeting of Oldřich and Božena ==
The historian Cosmas of Prague recorded the legend of Oldřich and Božena, in his Chronica Boëmorum ("Chronicle of the Bohemians"). According to the legend, the young (and married) Oldřich set out on a hunt and travelled to Peruc. There, he spied a beautiful peasant girl, Božena, by a well known today as Božena's Spring and was immediately entranced by her.

Oldřich abandoned his hunt and took Božena back to Prague, where she eventually gave birth to his illegitimate son Bretislaus. In the legend, Oldřich's first meeting with Božena took place in sight of the Oldřich Oak.

Božena was indeed the savior of the Czech House of Přemysl. Oldřich had two brothers, but one of them, Jaromír, had been castrated by the eldest sibling, Boleslaus III. Boleslaus III himself was imprisoned in Poland, possibly having only a daughter. Thus Oldřich was the one Přemyslid able to have a son and heir. His first wife is thought to have borne no children.

Božena's low birth is alluded to in the chronicle of Cosmas, which states that Oldřich first met her "riding through the village". The illegitimate birth of her son Bretislaus to a low-born mother is believed to have made it necessary for him to resort to abduction when he later sought to marry a noble bride (Judith of Schweinfurt). At any rate, she was held to be a peasant woman already by the author of the early 14th-century Chronicle of Dalimil.

Royal titles
Preceded by Emma of Mělník	Duchess consort of Bohemia ?–?	Succeeded by Judith of Schweinfurt
