= Palbric Art Foundation =

Czech-based art non-profit organization

Founded in 2015 by Michael Cukier, Palbric Art Foundation is a non-profit organization based in Prague, Czech Republic. The focus of the Palbric Art Foundation is on art and culture; specifically the richness of diversity and the benefits of integration and plural societies.

== Mission ==
Palbric Art Foundation's mission is to "use art to speak to the world." Their first objective is to address refugee and immigration issues through art.

== Collections ==
Milos Reindl

Palbric Art Foundation's featured artist is Milos Reindl, a Czech-Canadian artist and onetime political refugee. Palbric Art Foundation represents the world's largest collection Milos Reindl artwork, including hundreds of paintings, sketches and drawings, and is committed to continuing his legacy.

=== Le Corbusier ===
Palbric Art Foundation holds a selection of original graphics, mainly lithographs and etchings, by the architect and artist Charles-Édouard Jeanneret, better known as Le Corbusier.

Selected works from these collections are on display at the Palais Art Hotel in Prague.

== Selected events and exhibitions ==
- World Refugee Day Commemorations, Montreal, Canada, June 20, 2017 (Co-hosted by UNHCR Canada and TCRI).
- Do Not Pass By, Montreal, Canada October 15 - November 15, 2016
- Dialogue with Emperor Quin (Sponsor), London, United Kingdom, October 3–28, 2016
- Do Not Pass By, Prague, Czech Republic, August 14–28, 2016
