= Adolf Liebscher =

Czech painter (1857–1919)

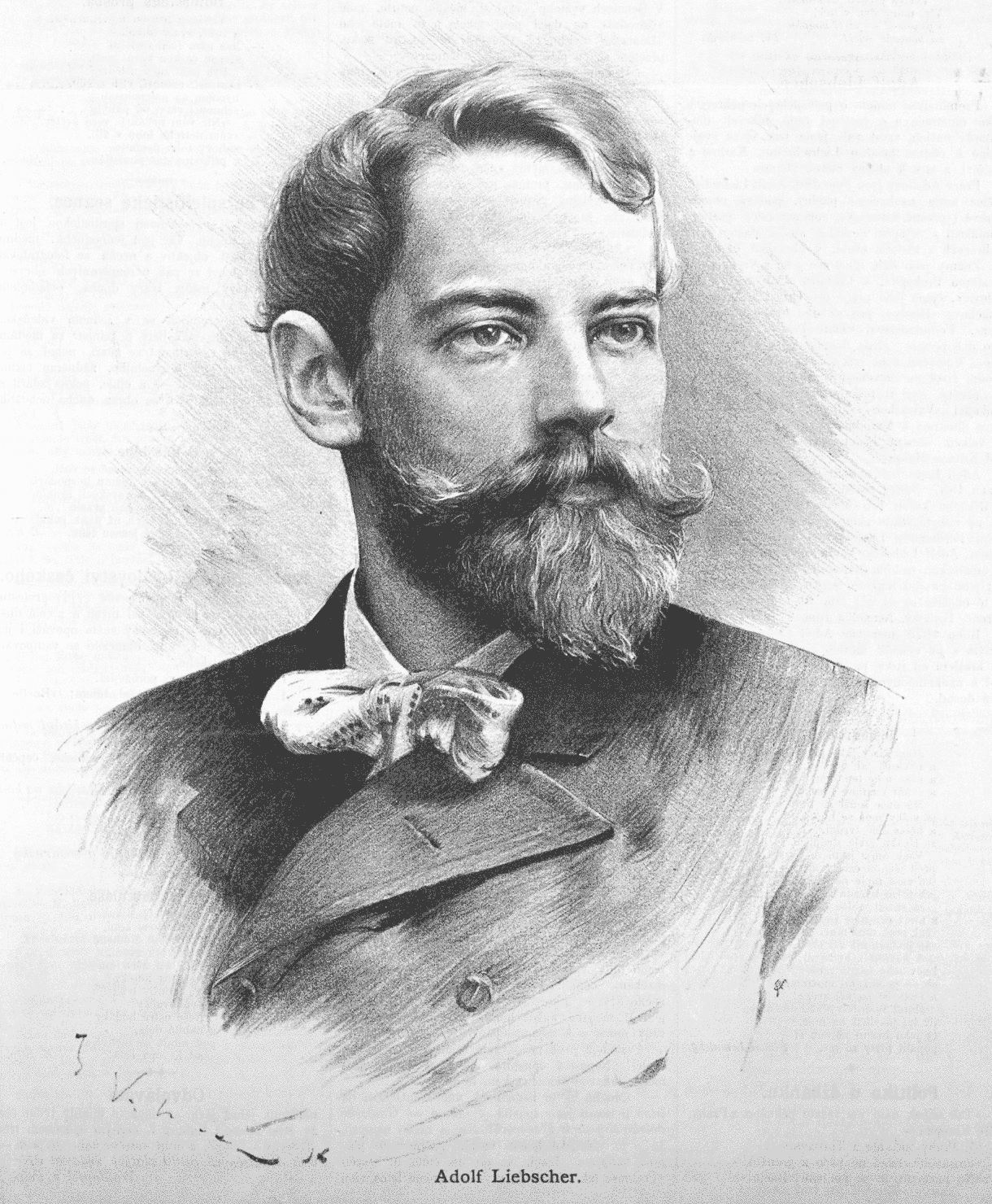
Adolf Liebscher, by Jan Vilímek (1887).

Adolf Liebscher (11 March 1857, in Prague, Austrian Empire – 11 June 1919, in Potštejn) was a Czech history painter.

== Life and work ==
After completing his education in the local schools, he went to Vienna, where he attended a three-year course for drawing teachers under Ferdinand Laufberger. He then spent six months preparing to enter a competition for the creation of decorations in the foyer at the National Theater. He received the Second Prize, and his drawings were used for the lunettes. Afterwards, he spent several months in Italy.

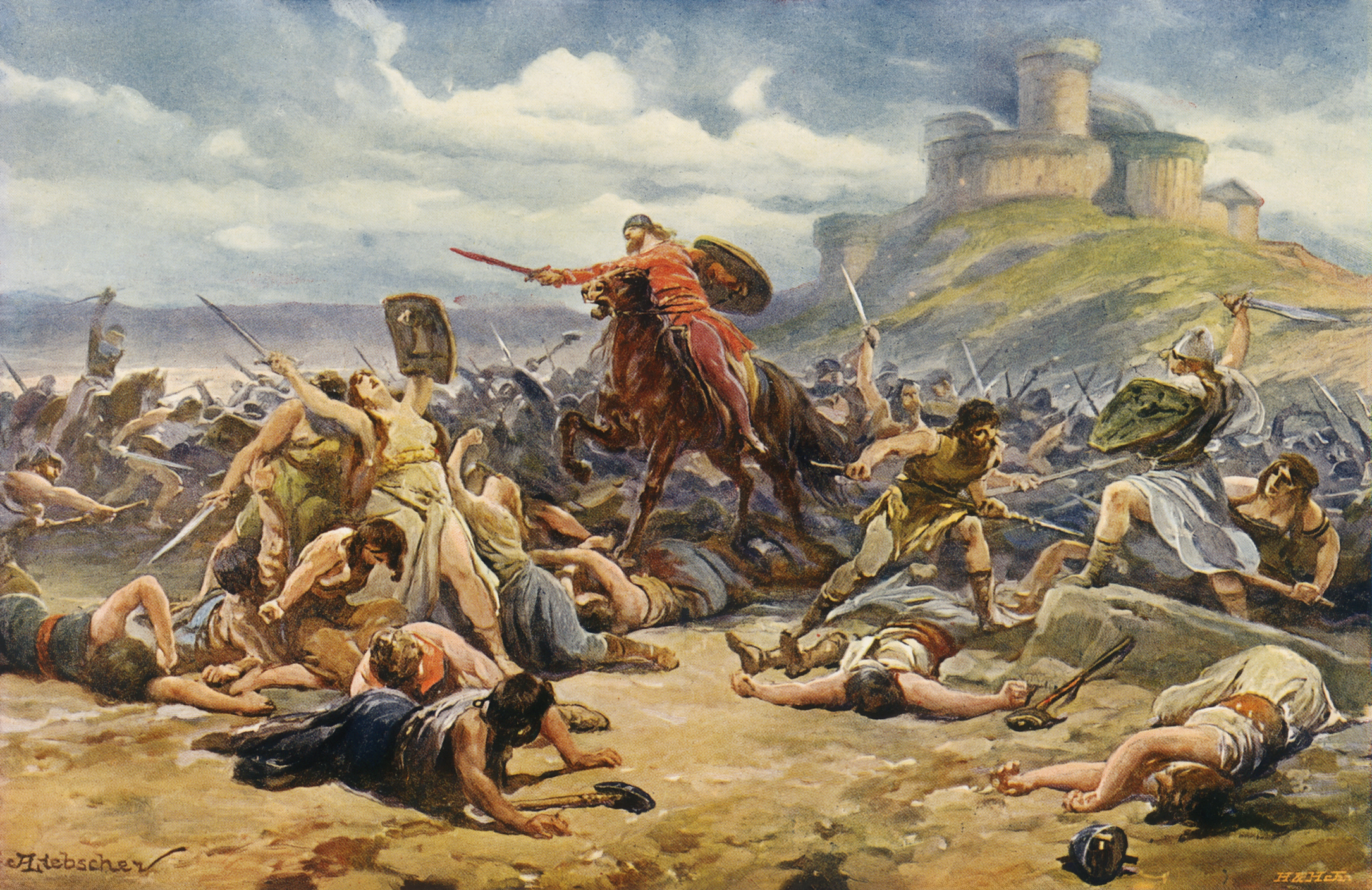
Scene from The Maidens' War, a Bohemian folktale; unknown year

Upon his return, he received a series of public commissions, including work at the Rudolfinum, the municipal union hall in Písek and the government office buildings in Vinohrady and Vyškov. He became a teacher at the Technical University in 1879, was promoted to Associate Professor in 1895 and was named a Professor in 1911.

In 1903, he exhibited a cycle of tempera paintings entitled "Czech Elegy", featuring an iconic portrait crowned with thorns, meant to symbolize the suffering of the Czech nation from the oppression of the Austro-Hungarian monarchy. That same year, he painted a portrait of Emperor Franz Joseph.

In addition to his historical scenes, he produced folk-costume studies, altarpieces and illustrations, many of which appeared in the magazines Zlatá Praha and Světozor. Together with his brother Karel (who was also an artist), he created a panoramic mural, "The Swedes on the Charles Bridge", for the Mirror Maze at Petřín.

== Gallery ==
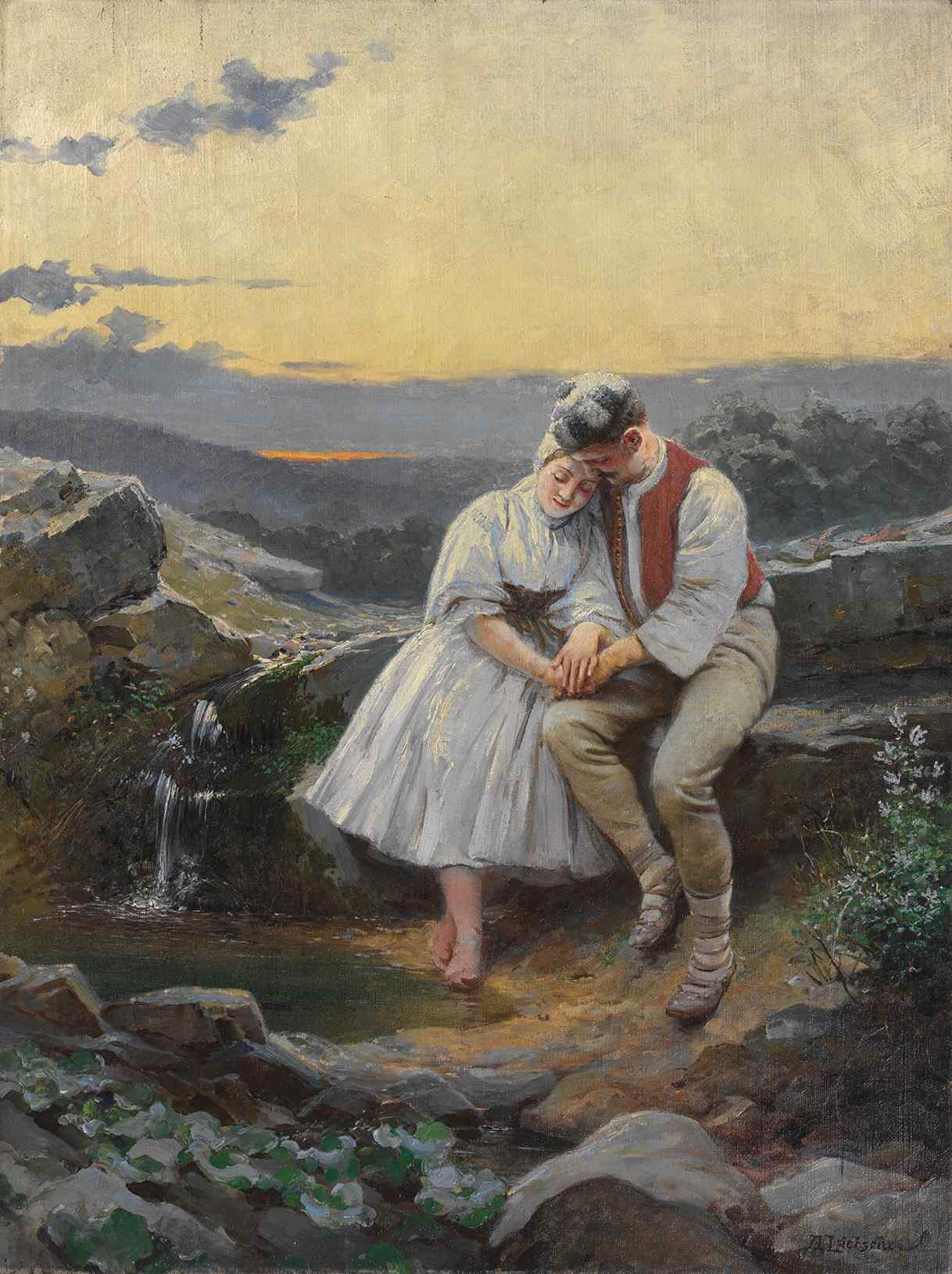
Montenegrin Idyll, unknown year

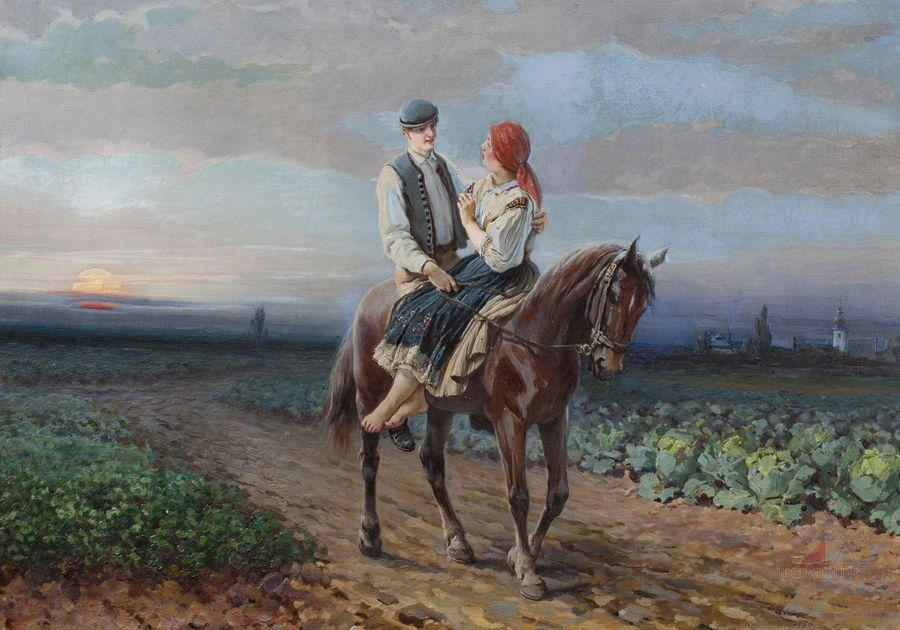
Zalíbení (lit. 'Both in love'), unknown year

Conquest of Prague by Jiřík Poděbrady in 1448, unknown year

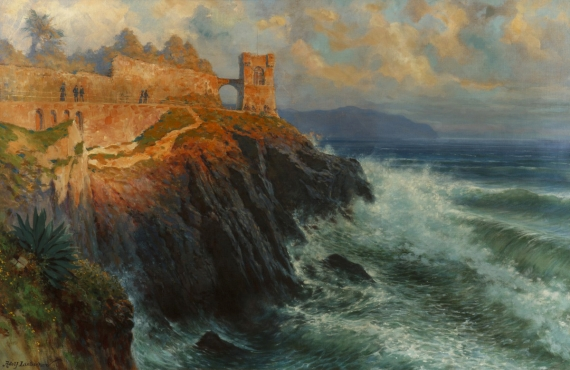
Pobřeží (lit. 'Coast'), unknown year

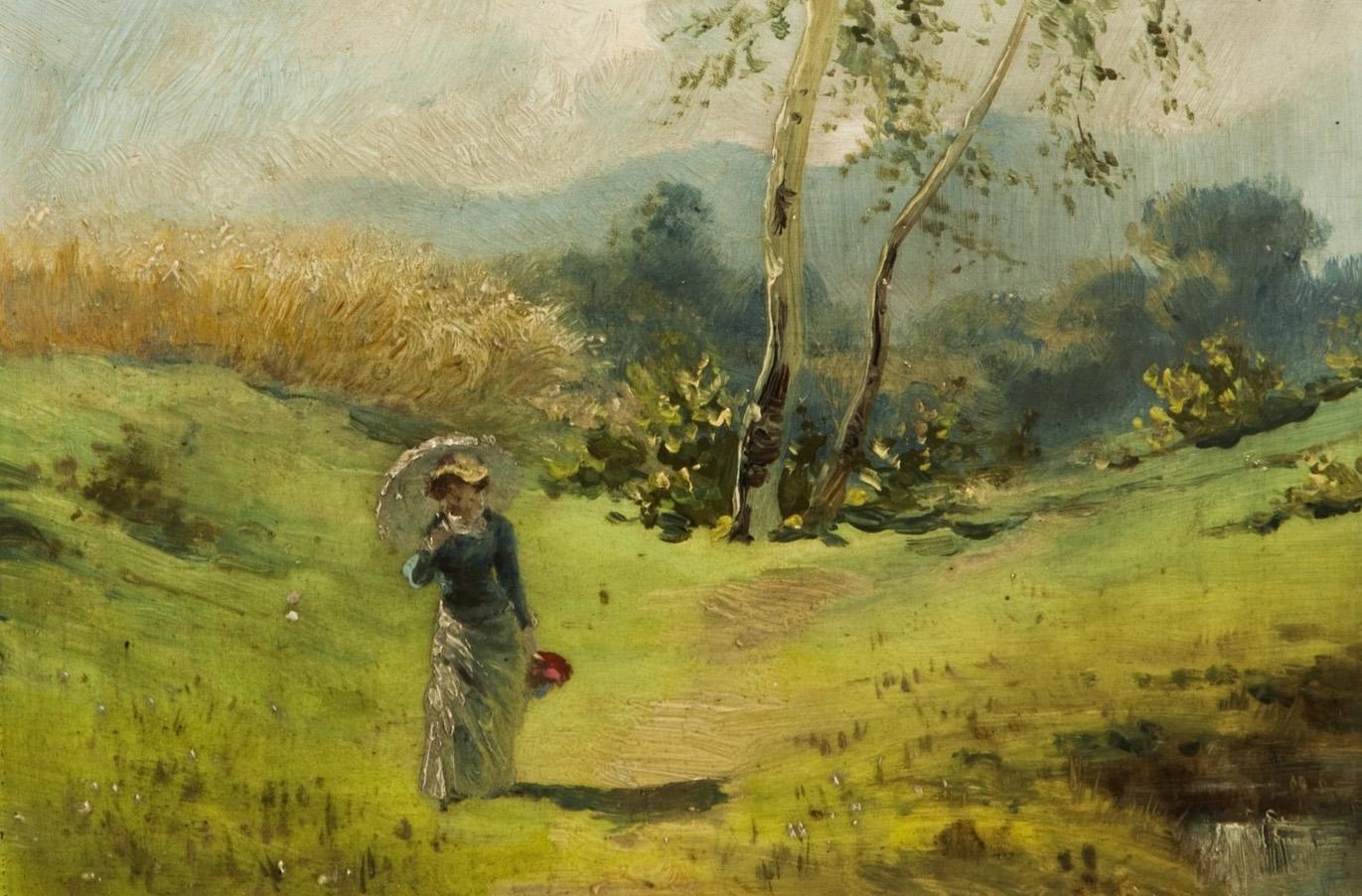
Dame mit Sonnenschirm, 1884

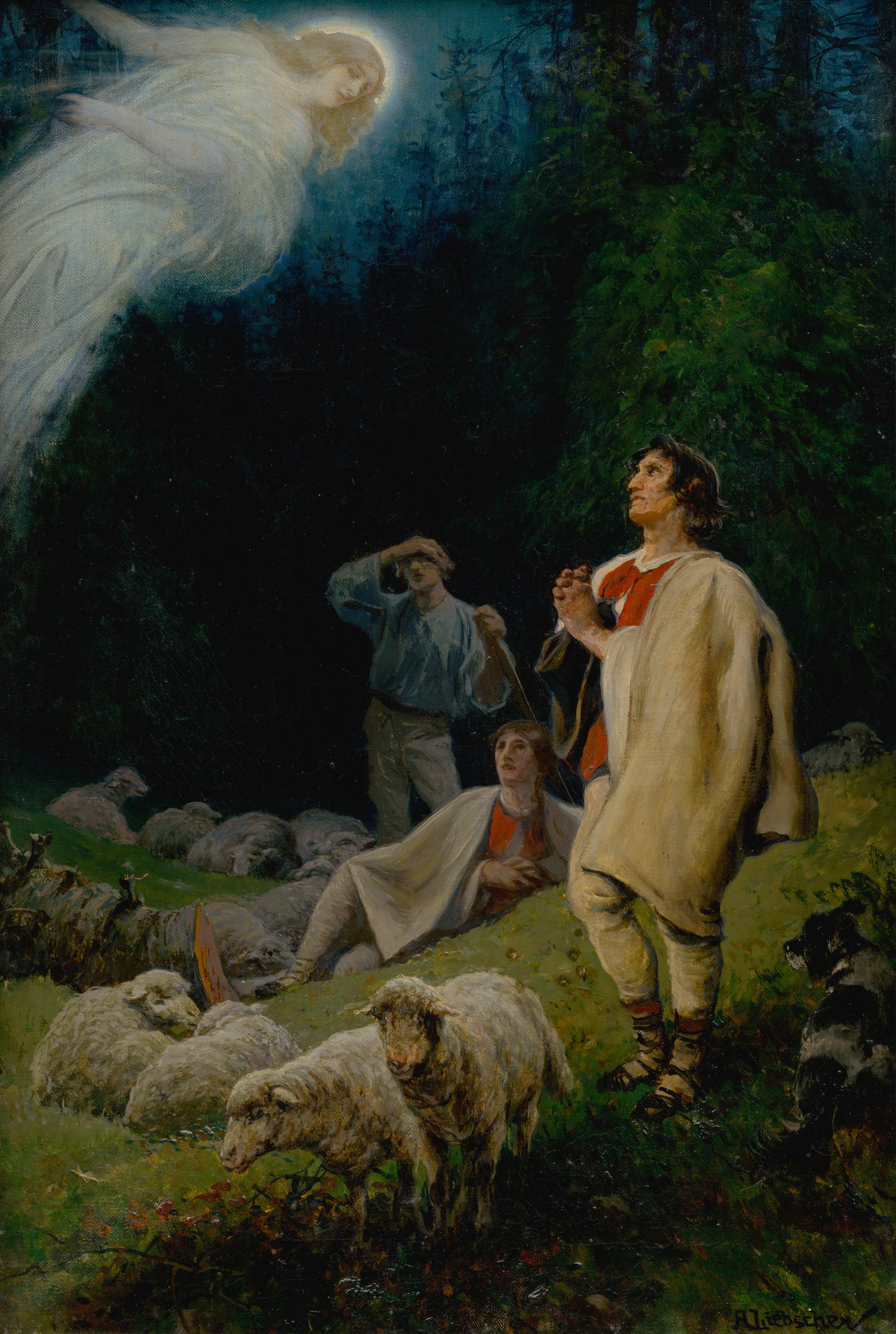
Pastierske zjavenie (lit. 'Pastoral revelation'), 1880

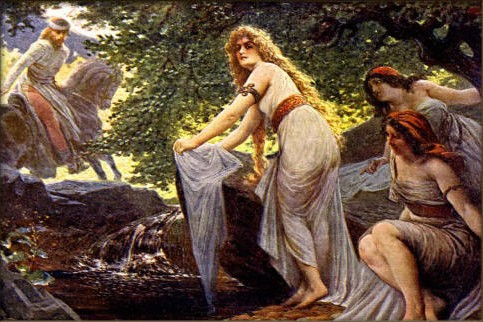
Prince Oldřich and Bozena, unknown year

Campers conquer Prachatice, unknown year (likely part of a series on the Hussite Wars)

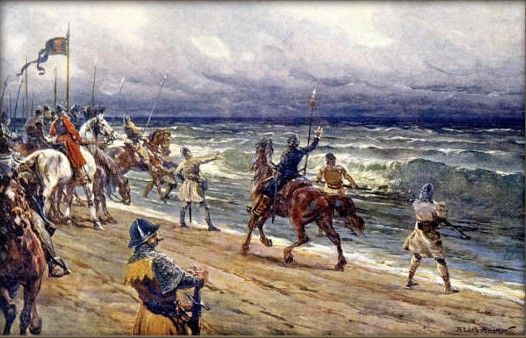
Czechs in the Baltic, unknown year

Battle of Vítkov Hill, unknown year (likely part of a series on the Hussite Wars)

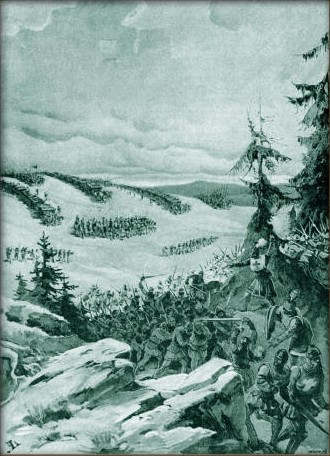
Crusaders near Domažlice flee from the approaching Hussites, unknown year (likely part of a series on the Hussite Wars)

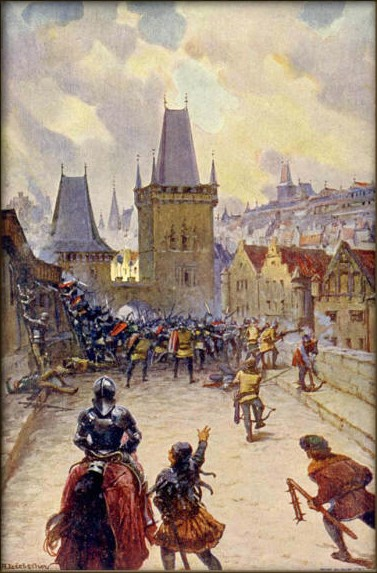
Attack of Hussite Praguers, unknown year (likely part of a series on the Hussite Wars)

The famous entry of King Ladislav into Prague in 1453, unknown year

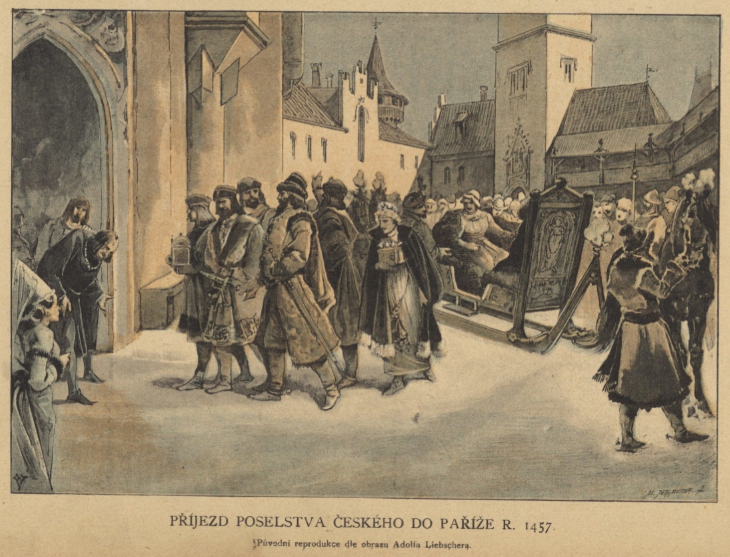
Arrival of the Czech delegation in Paris, for an 1893 Pictoral History of the Czech Nation

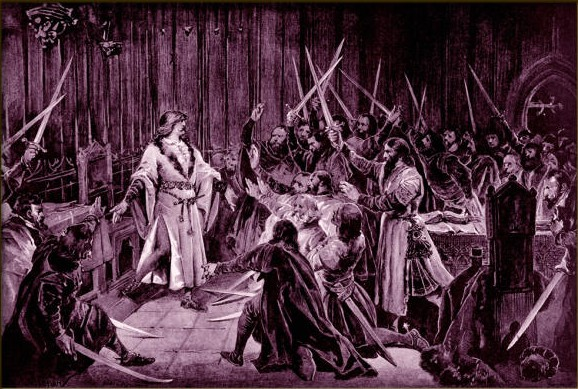
Election of Jiřík of Poděbrady as King of Bohemia at the Old Town Hall on March 2, 1458, unknown year

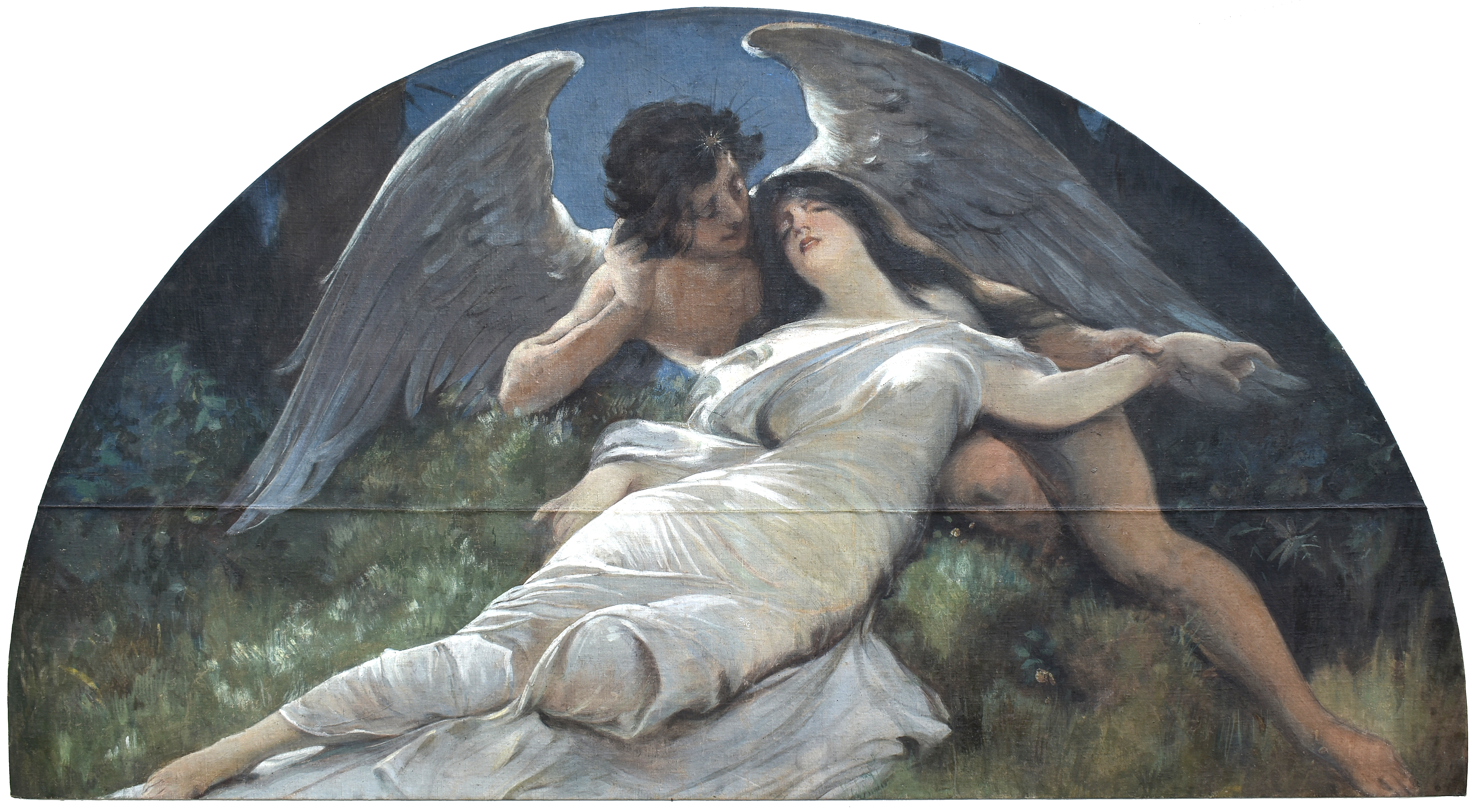
Unknown title and year

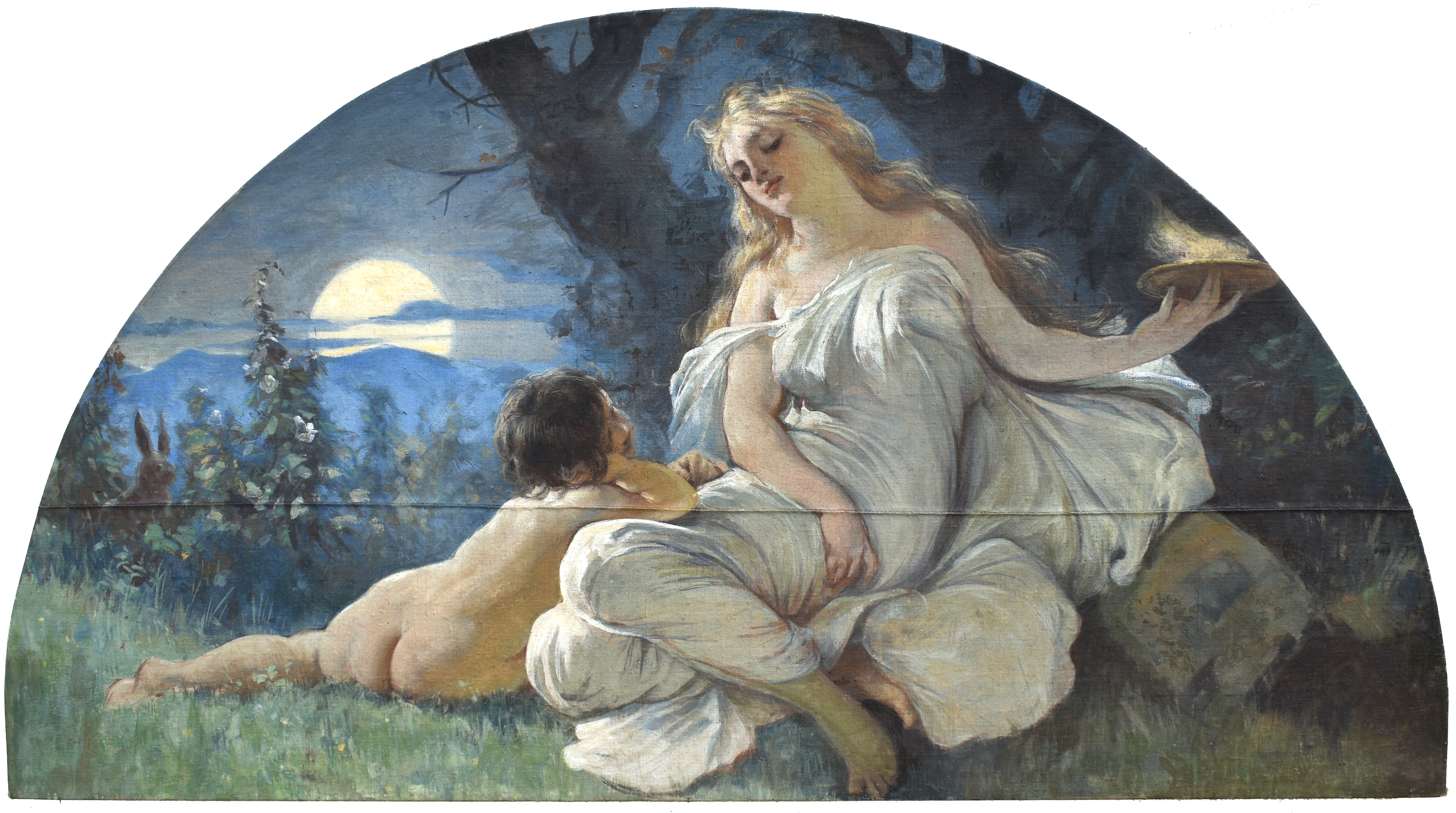
Day, unknown year

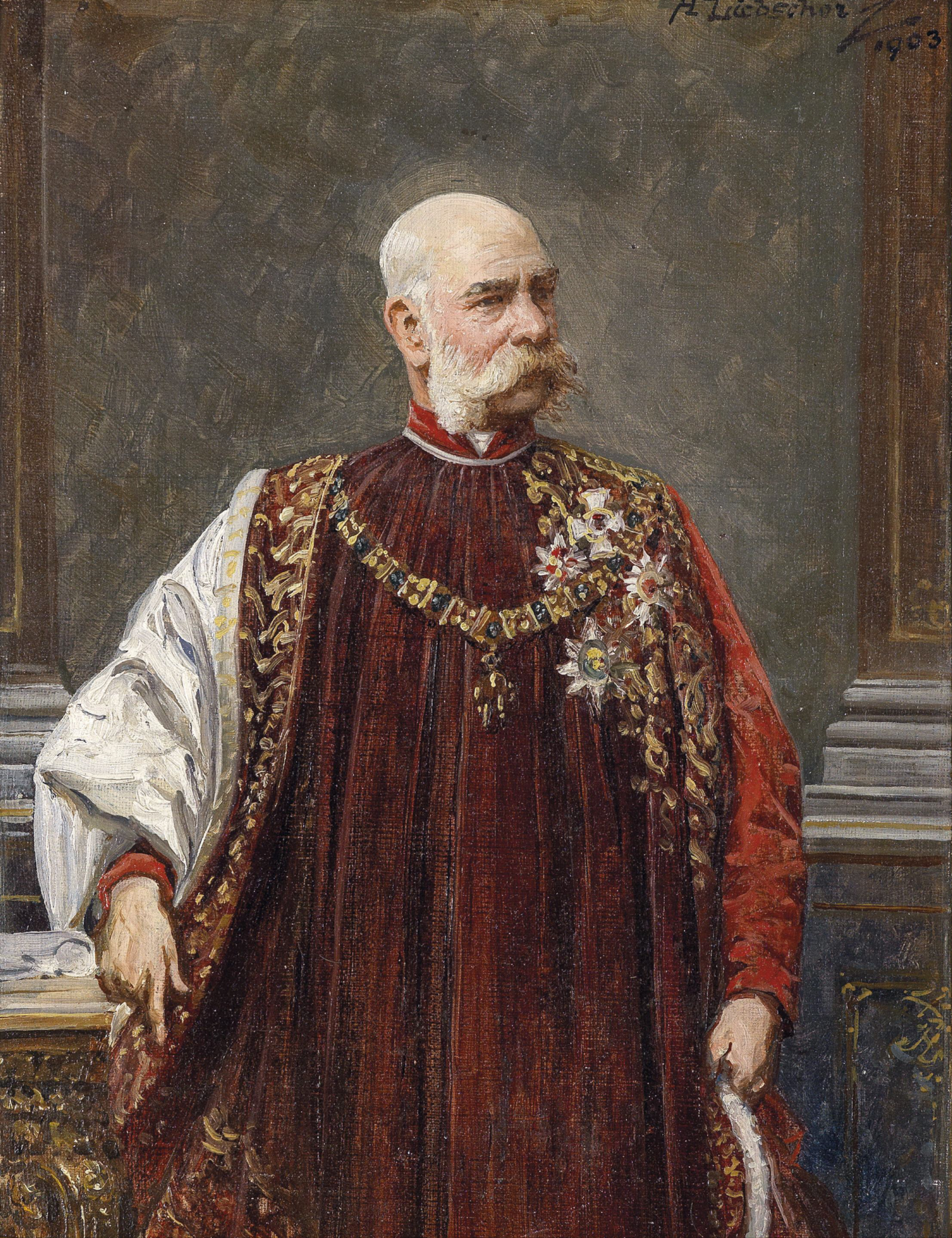
Portrait of the old Emperor Franz Joseph in the regalia of the Order of the Golden Fleece, 1903
