= Bohuslav Schnirch =

Czech sculptor

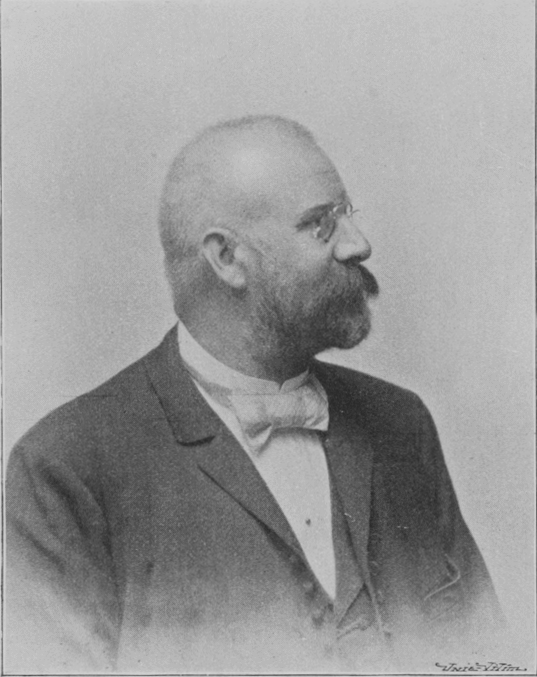
Bohuslav Schnirch; from Zlatá Praha (1901)

Bohuslav Bedřich Josef Schnirch (10 August 1845 – 30 September 1901) was a Czech sculptor, designer and preservationist.

== Biography ==
Bohuslav Schnirch was born in Prague on 10 August 1845. Schnirch's father was the builder and engineer, Josef Emanuel Schnirch, and his great-uncle, Bedřich Schnirch, designed railways and bridges. He studied civil engineering and architecture at the Czech Technical University in Prague, where he was a student of Josef Zítek. He continued his studies in Vienna with Professors Franz Bauer and Franz Melnitzky, and in Munich with Max von Widnmann. During his stay in Italy, from 1871 to 1873, he was heavily influenced by Renaissance sculpture.

After returning home, Schnirch was approached by Zítek to provide decorations for the new National Theatre, that was under construction. He created statues of Apollo and the Nine Muses for the columns above the main entrance. Some of his bronze figures, on the corner pylons, were destroyed during the fire that engulfed parts of the theatre shortly after its opening in 1881. He also provided decorations for the Rudolfinum; another building designed by Zítek.

The Neo-Renaissance design for the National Museum, by Josef Schulz, gave Schnirch an opportunity to compete in a contest, to select a sculptor for decorative work. He won the competition, over Antonín Pavel Wagner and Antonín Popp, and created four allegorical groups for the main dome, representing "Dedication", "Enthusiasm", "Love for the Truth" and "Love for the Past". He entered another competition in 1894, to design a monument for St. Wenceslaus but, despite very positive reviews for his entry, he was passed over in favor of Josef Václav Myslbek.

His largest and most familiar work, an equestrian monument to George of Poděbrady, was completed in 1891, depicting the moment when George is reaching out to shake the hand of Matthias Corvinus. The figure is twice life size and constructed of copper plates. His final major commission involved figures for the City Insurance Company on Old Town Square. One, a firefighter rescuing a victim, was the last work he completed before his death. The other, "A Call to Alarm", was completed by one of his students, Ladislav Šaloun.

The Bohuslav Schnirch House in the Vinohrady district, has been declared a cultural monument. It was built in 1875, from a design by Antonín Wiehl, with friezes by Schnirch.

Schnirch died in Prague on 30 September 1901, aged 56.

== Selected works ==
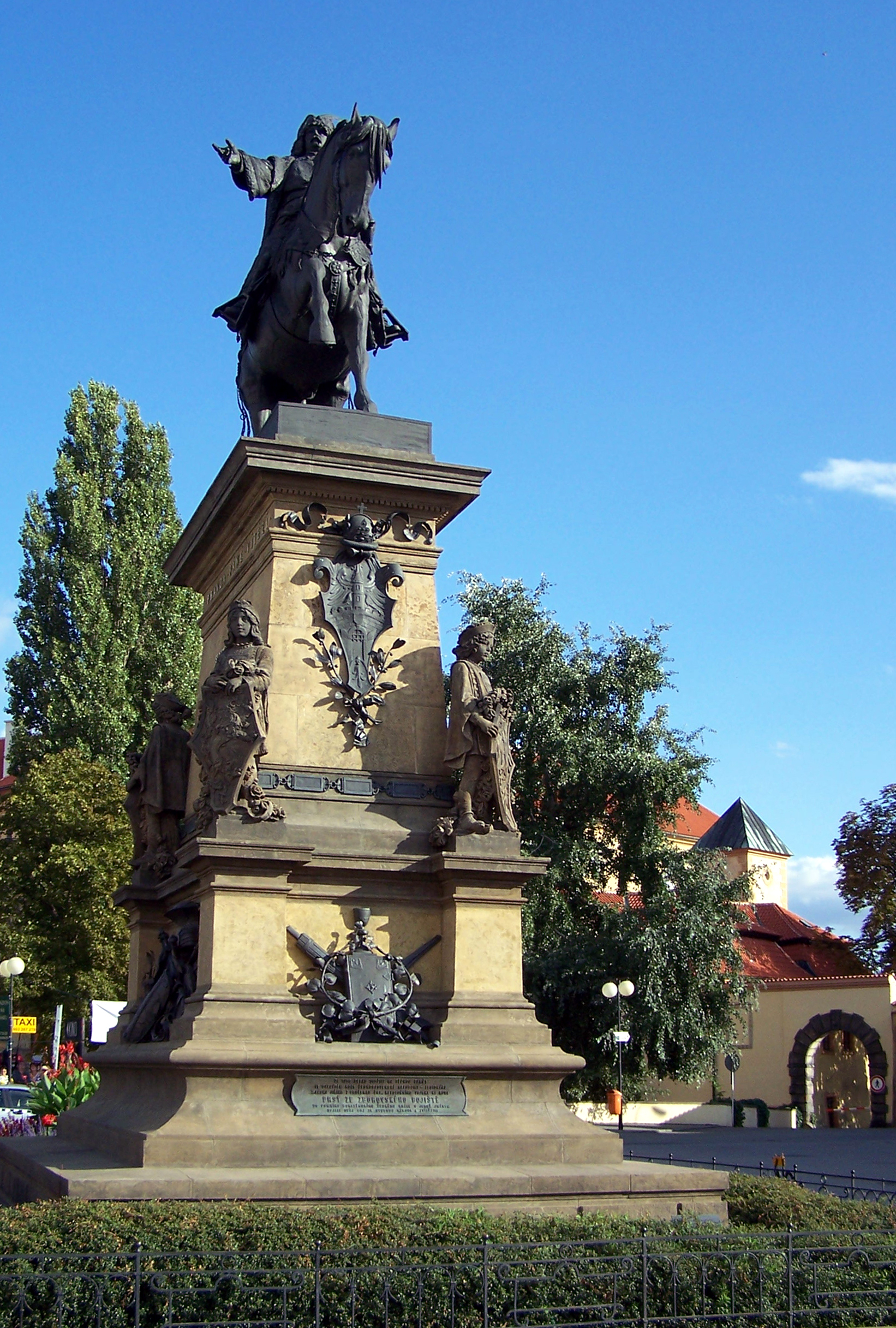
Monument to George of Poděbrady

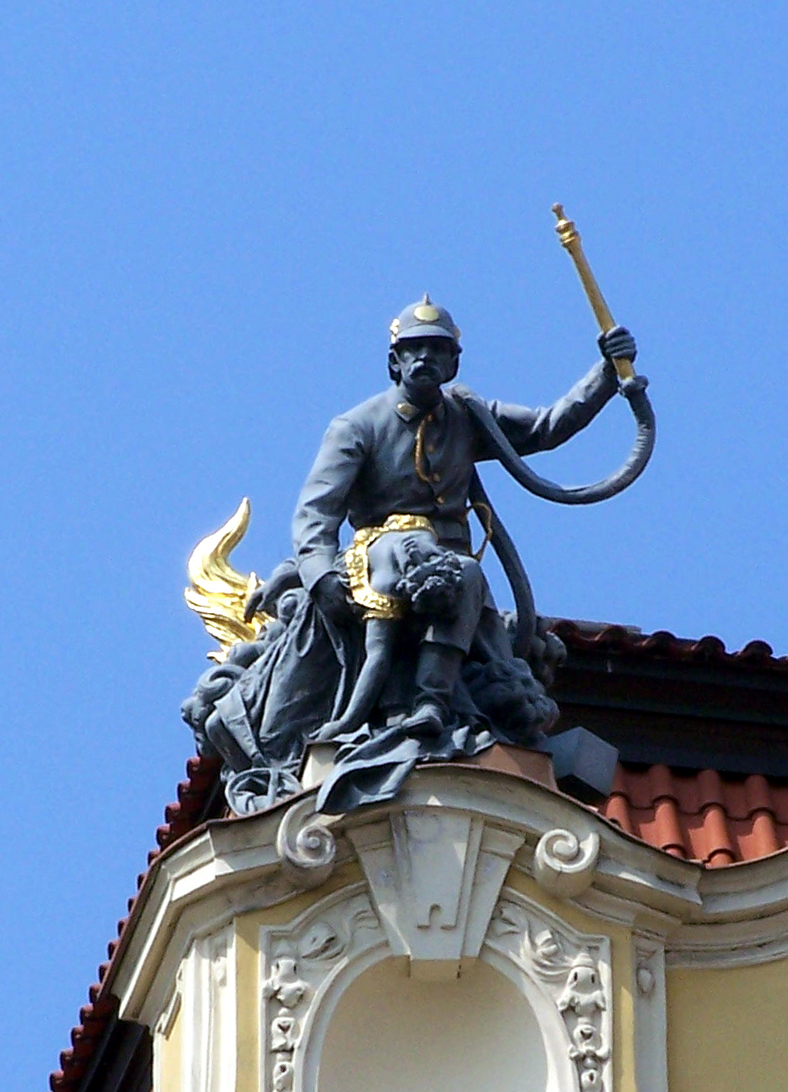
The Firefighter

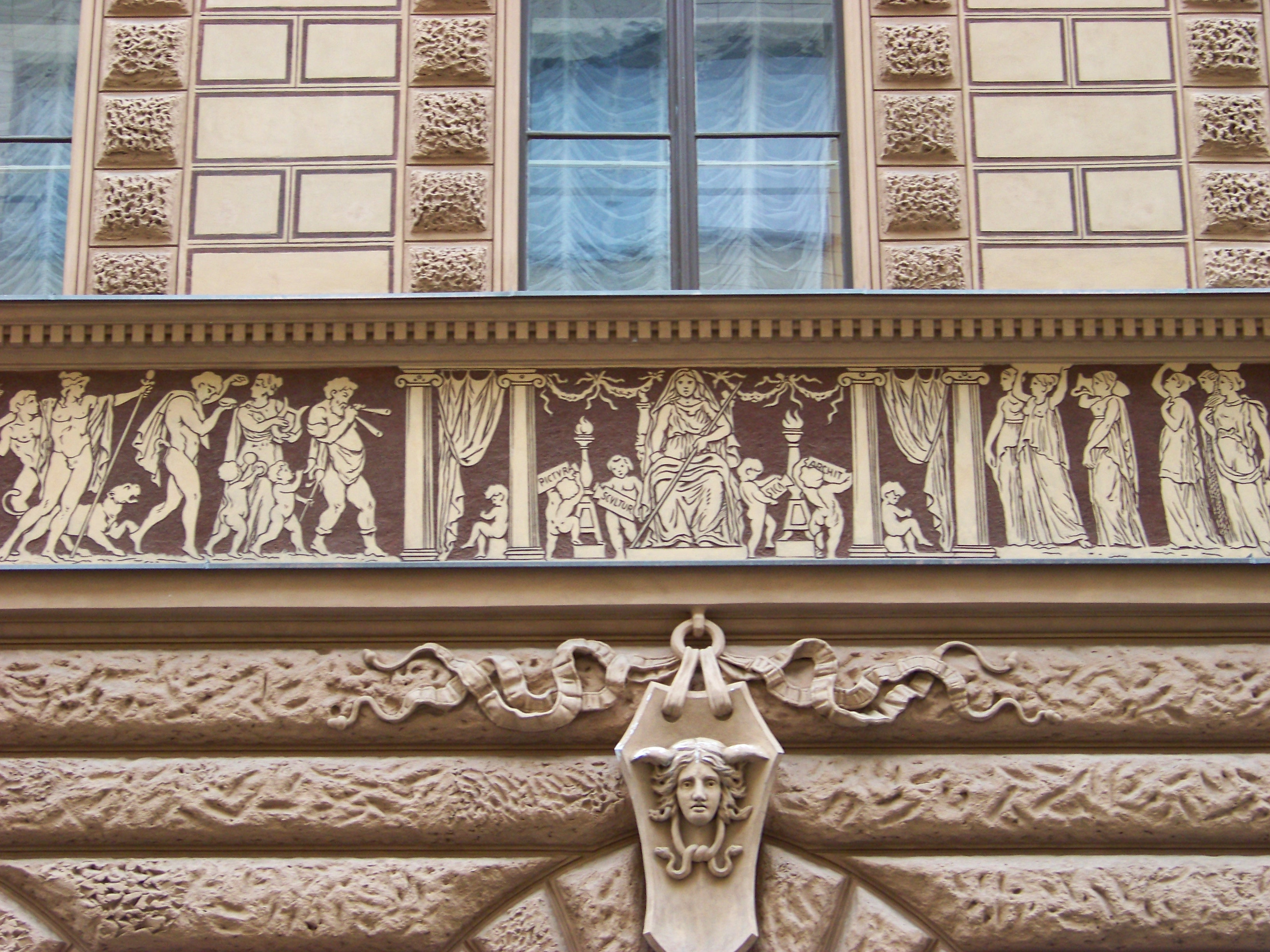
Section of the frieze on the Schnirch House

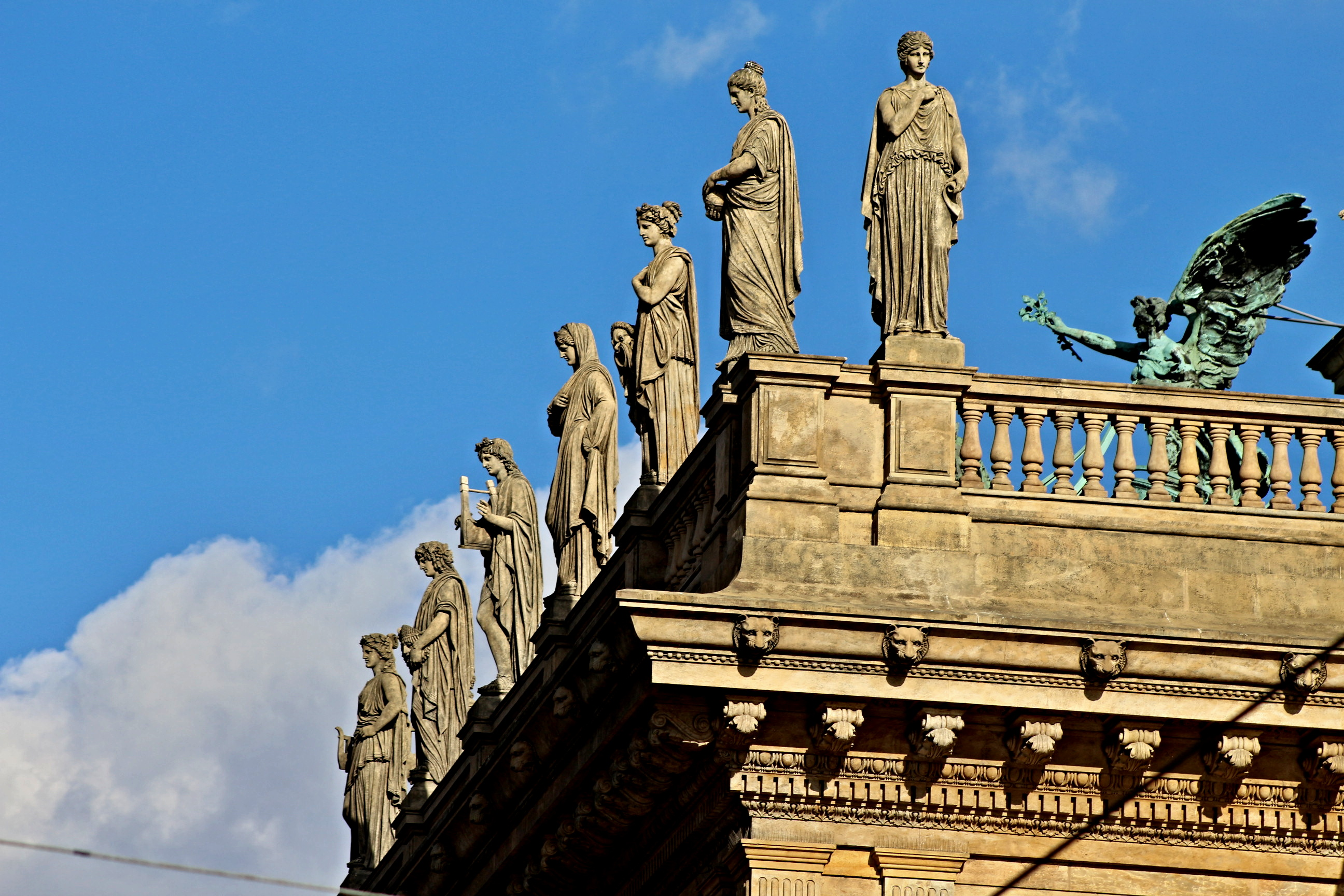
Apollo and the Muses

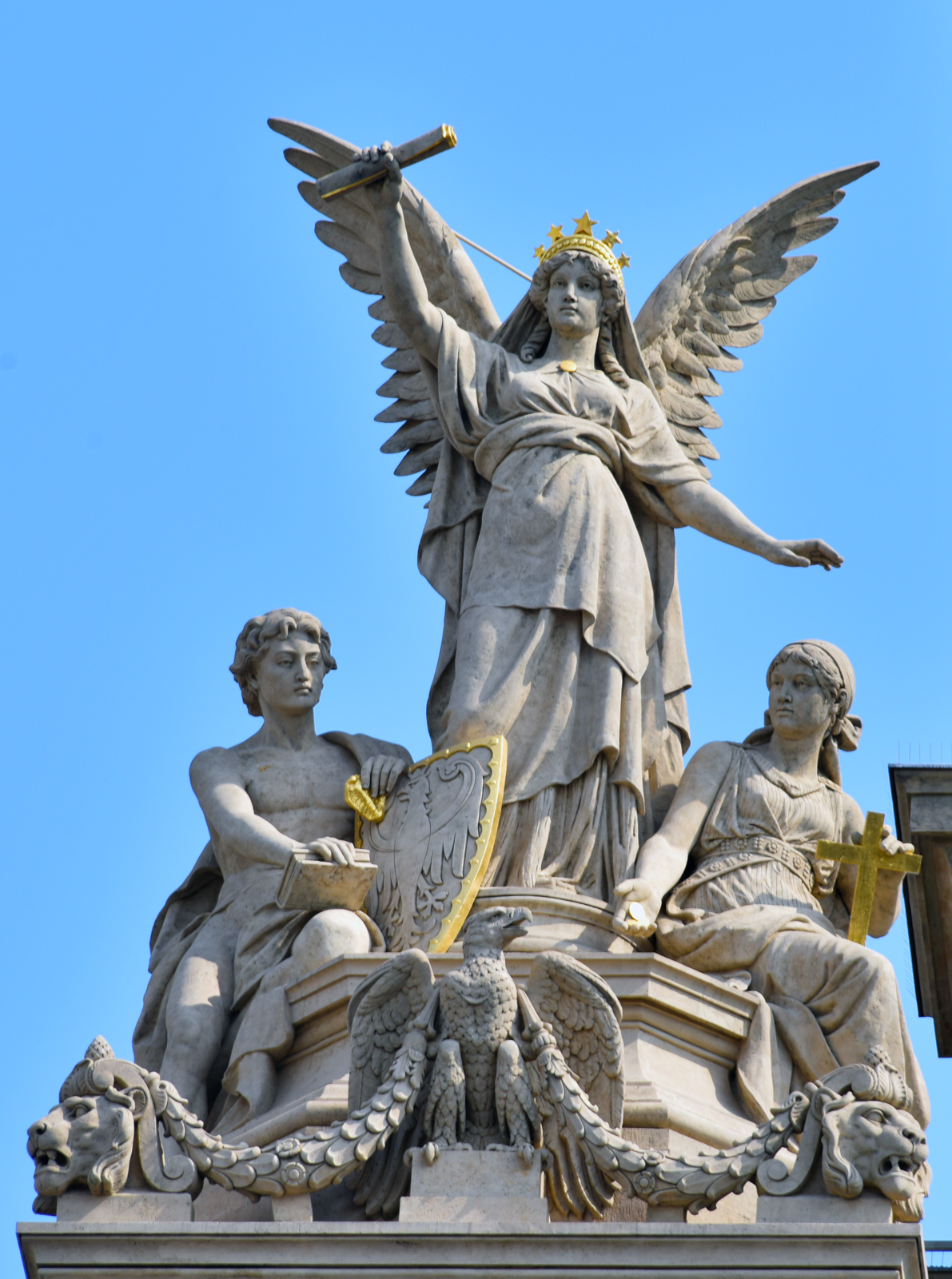
"Dedication",
National Museum
