= Emil Filla =

Czech painter (1882–1953)

- Born: 4 April 1882; Chropyně, Austria-Hungary
- Died: 7 October 1953 (aged 71); Prague, Czechoslovakia
- Education: Academy of Fine Arts, Prague
- Known for: Painting
- Movement: Cubism

Emil Filla (4 April 1882 – 7 October 1953) was a Czech painter. He was a leader of the avant-garde in Prague between World War I and World War II and was an early Cubist painter.

== Early life ==
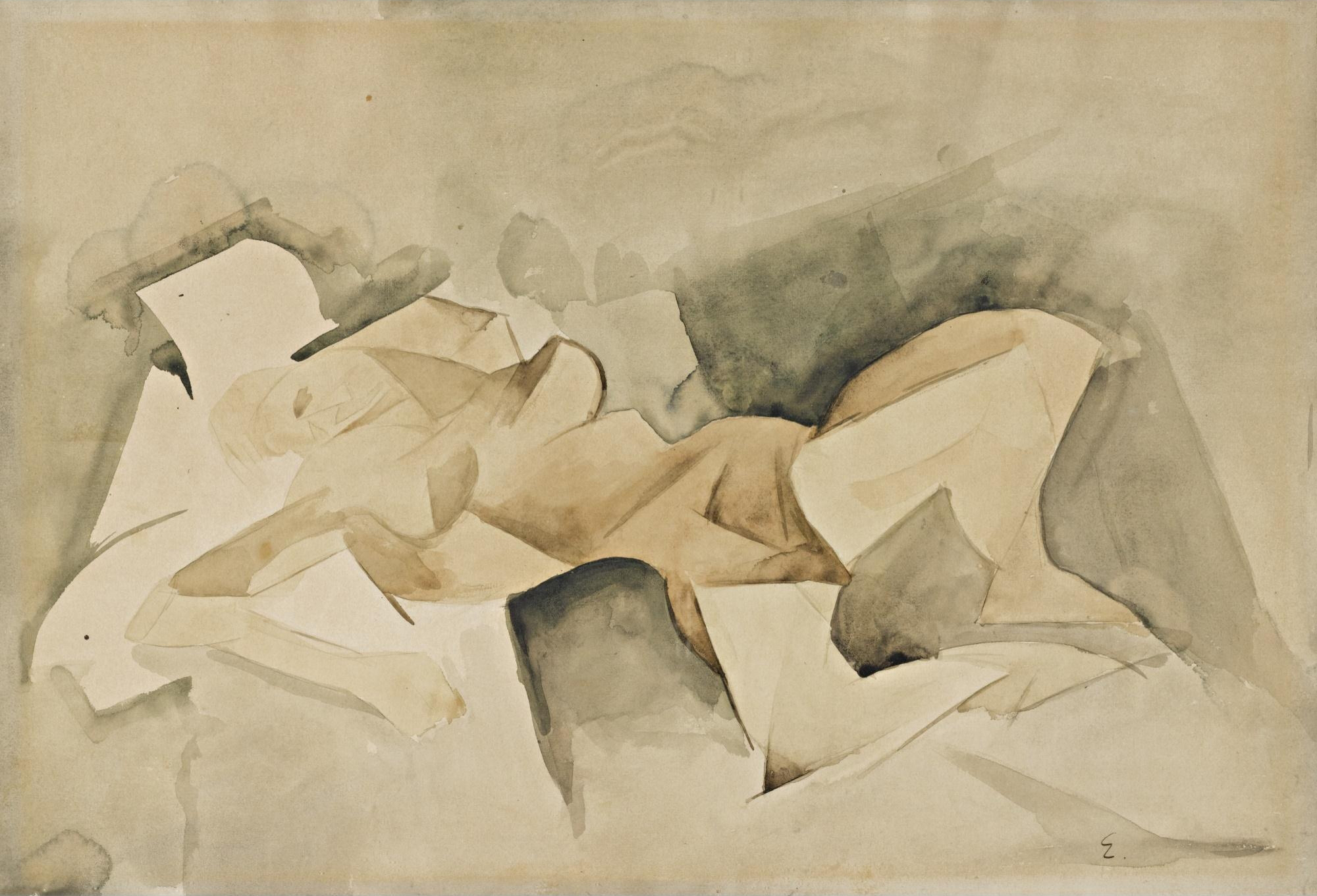
Filla, c. 1912, Nude, watercolor on board, 43.18 x 62.23 cm

Filla was born in Chropyně, Moravia, and spent his childhood in Brno, but later moved to Prague. Beginning in 1903, he studied at the Academy of Fine Arts in Prague, but he left the school in 1906.

== Painting ==
Filla was a member of the group Osma (The Eight) in 1907-1908, which had commonalities with the Fauves and also had direct ties to the German Expressionist group Die Brücke. Important works by Filla from this period include Reader of Dostoevsky (1907) and Chess Players (1908). In 1909, he became a member of the Mánes Union of Fine Arts.

Beginning in 1910 he painted primarily in a Cubist style, strongly influenced by Picasso and Braque, and produced works such as Salome (1911) and Bathers (1912). He also began to paint many still lifes around that time. In 1911, he edited several issues of Volné směry, promoting Cubism and publishing reproductions of works by Picasso. After both readers and the leaders of Mánes reacted negatively, he and others withdrew from Mánes and founded Skupina výtvarných umělců (Group of Visual Artists), which was a Cubist-oriented group.

Around 1913, he and Otto Gutfreund, produced some of the earliest Cubist sculpture made anywhere. Before World War I he moved to Paris, but left for the Netherlands when war broke out. He returned to Prague after the war. During the 1920s, he further developed his version of Synthetic Cubism and rejoined Mánes. Like many Czech modernists, he was active in design as well as in painting; in 1925 he designed paintings on glass for the Czechoslovak Pavilion at the International Exposition of Modern Industrial and Decorative Arts in Paris. In the late 1920s and early 1930s, Surrealist influence also began to show in his painting and sculpture, and he was a participant in Poesie 1932, an international exhibition in Prague that introduced Surrealism to the Czech public. He did not, however, become a Surrealist.

His works have been compiled by Vojtěch Lahoda in a catalogue raisonné published in 2007 by Academia Press in Prague.

== 1939–1953 ==
On the first day of World War II he was arrested by the Gestapo for his anti-Nazi activism together with painter Josef Čapek and others and was subsequently imprisoned in German concentration camps Dachau and Buchenwald. However, he survived, returned home and began to teach at the Vysoká škola uměleckoprůmyslová v Praze (VŠUP—Academy of Arts, Architecture and Design in Prague). Filla's teachings at the Academy ensure the continuance of Czech Cubism, and his influence is notable in the works of his pupil Milos Reindl amongst others.

In 1945, he was the first artist to be given a post-war exhibition at Mánes. After the war, he exhibited mainly works from the cycle Boje a zápasy (Fights and Struggles), and later mainly produced landscapes. During his lifetime he was active as a painter, sculptor, collector, theoretician, editor, organizer, and diplomat. From 1947 to 1952, he lived and worked in the castle in Peruc. In the southern wing of the castle, where he lived, today there is a memorial hall with his paintings. He died on 7 October 1953 in Prague and is buried in Střešovice district of Prague.

He idolised Vincent van Gogh, Pierre Bonnard and Edvard Munch as well as Picasso and Braque.

== Monetary valuation ==
His painting "sculptress in the studio" was sold by Sotheby's on 13 June 2011 for 623,650 GBP and "seated woman" was sold on 14 November 2017 for 729,000 GBP.

On 28 November 2021, "portrait of an old man" from 1914, sold for 1.297 million Euros. https://www.galeriekodl.cz/en/polozka/2432/ This is the highest recorded price paid for a painting by Filla.

== See also ==
- Czech Cubism
