= Johannes Benk =

Austrian sculptor (1844–1914)

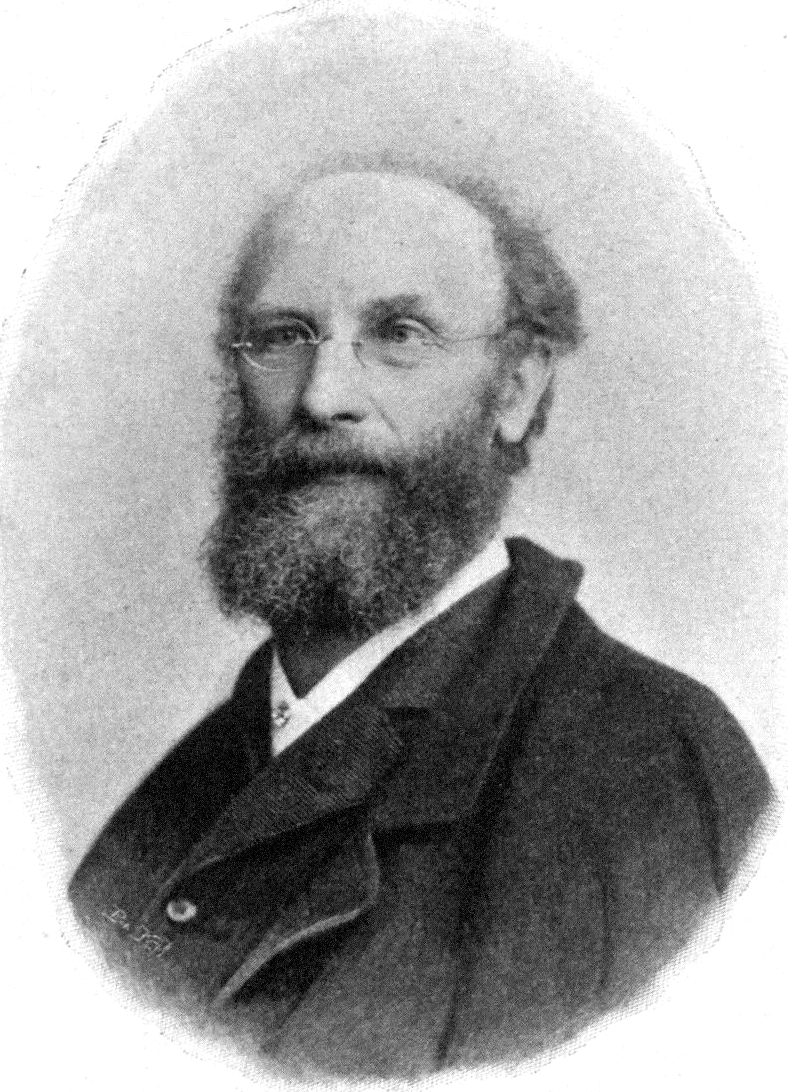
Johannes Benk; photograph by Josef Löwy (1890s)

Johannes Benk (27 July 1844, in Vienna – 12 March 1914, in Vienna) was an Austrian monumental sculptor.

== Biography ==
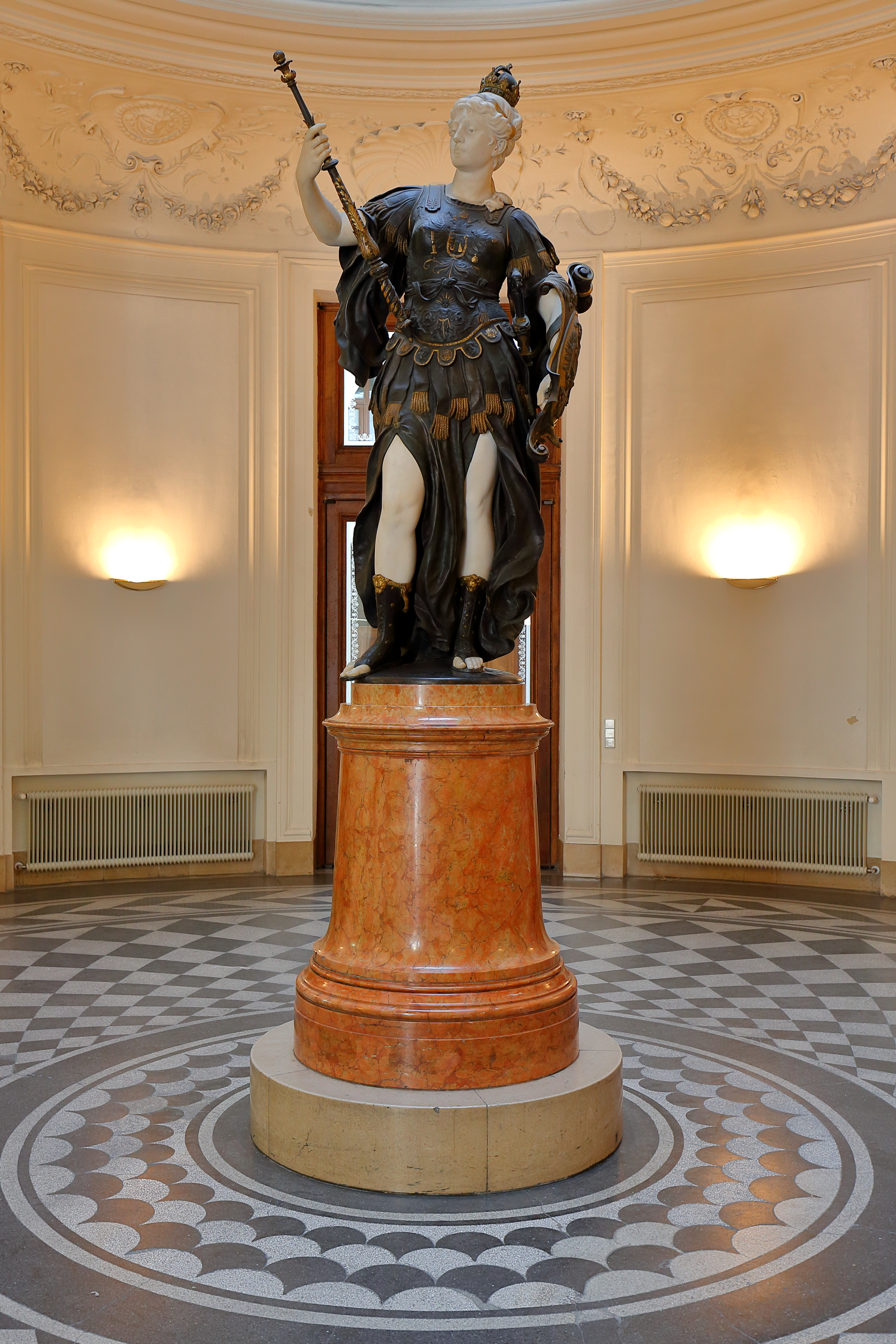
An Allegory of Austria at the Länderbank seat on Hohenstaufengasse, Vienna

His father, János Benk (1814–1895), was a decorative sculptor and stonemason from Osijek. After completing his primary education, he studied with the sculptor, Franz Bauer, then went to Dresden, where he studied at the Academy of Fine Arts with Ernst Julius Hähnel. He participated in several competitions for monumental sculpture, gaining notice with his designs for statues of Wilhelm von Tegetthoff, Beethoven and the Empress Maria Theresa, although none of those designs were realized. In 1862, the Academy awarded him its Gundel-Prize for excellence.

A scholarship enabled him to study in Rome and Florence from 1870 to 1871. Upon returning, he opened a studio in his father's home. He soon became popular and attracted a notable patron; Baron Karl von Hasenauer.

His major works include a group of allegorical statues, representing Austria, for the staircase at the Hofwaffenmuseums (Court Weapons Museum, now the Museum of Military History) and the Deutschmeister Monument, honoring an army regiment, on the Ringstraße.

From 1872, he was a member of the Vienna Künstlerhaus and, from 1887, a member of "Pensionsgesellschaft bildender Künstler", a charity for needy sculptors. In 1887, he was named a Knight in the Order of Franz Joseph and, the following year, was awarded the Order of the Iron Crown, third class.

After he died, his studio passed to his son. As part of a project to extend the Apollogasse, his son accepted a payment of 100,000 Krone, and the building was demolished.

In 1924, a street in Vienna's Hietzing district was named after him.
