= Peruc =

- Market town
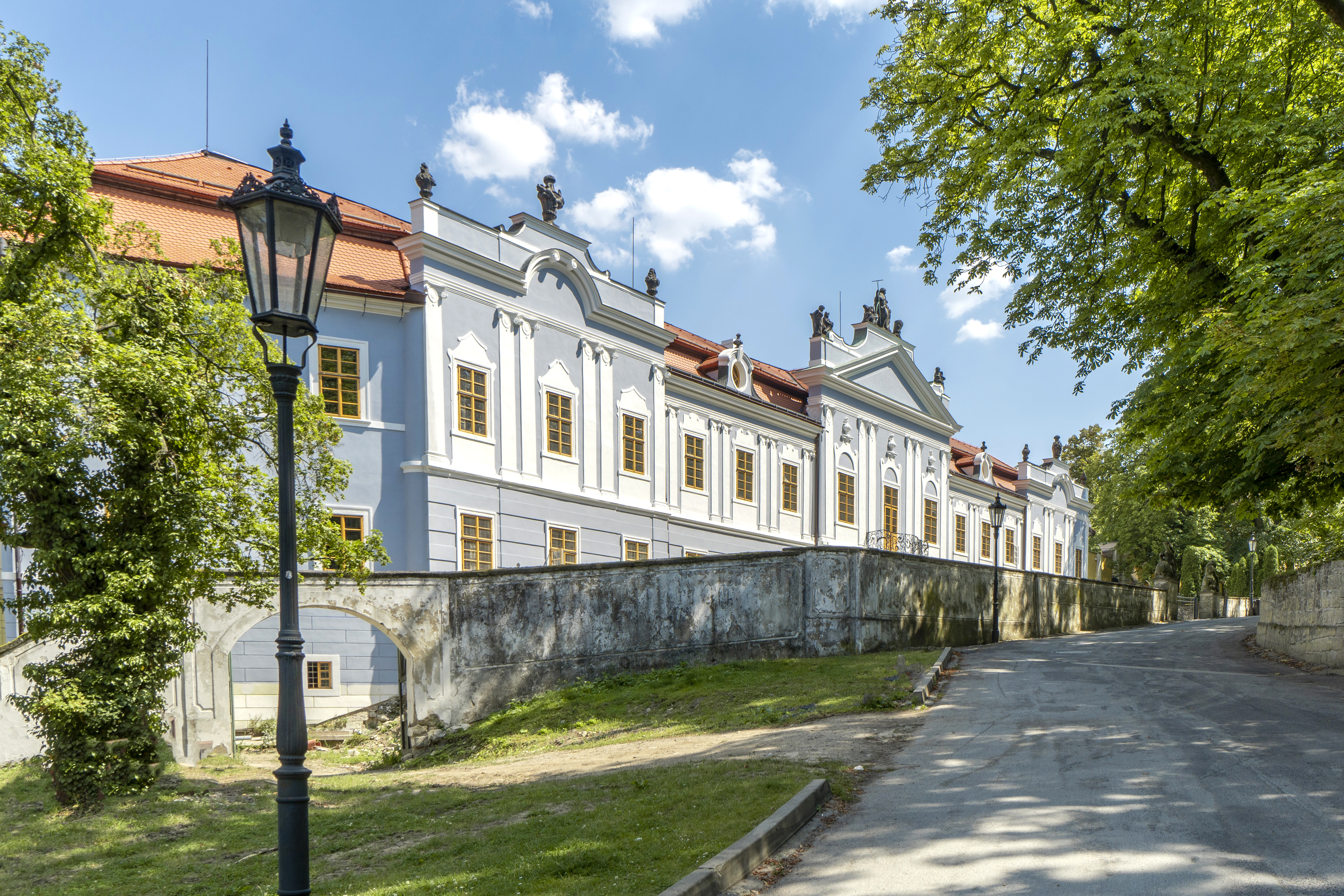
- Peruc Castle

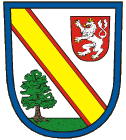
- Flag Coat of arms

- Location in the Czech Republic
- Coordinates: 50°20′19″N 13°57′50″E
- Country: Czech Republic
- Region: Ústí nad Labem
- District: Louny
- First mentioned: 1170

Area
  - Total: 53.38 km^{2} (20.61 sq mi)
- Elevation: 335 m (1,099 ft)

Population (2026-01-01)
  - Total: 2,374
  - Density: 44.47/km^{2} (115.2/sq mi)
- Time zone: UTC+1 (CET)
  - Summer (DST): UTC+2 (CEST)
- Postal codes: 439 07, 439 08, 440 01
- Website: www.peruc.cz

Peruc (Czech pronunciation: [ˈpɛruts]; German: Perutz) is a market town in Louny District in the Ústí nad Labem Region of the Czech Republic. It has about 2,400 inhabitants.

== Administrative division ==
Peruc consists of eight municipal parts (in brackets population according to the 2021 census):

- Peruc (909)
- Černochov (207)
- Chrastín (19)
- Hřivčice (215)
- Pátek (196)
- Radonice nad Ohří (181)
- Stradonice (227)
- Telce (359)

== Etymology ==
The name is derived from the personal name Peruť or Perut (better known by its diminutive form Peroutka), meaning "Peruť's/Perut's (court)".

== Geography ==
Peruc is located about 10 kilometres (6 mi) east of Louny and 40 km (25 mi) northwest of Prague. It lies in the Lower Ohře Table. The highest point is at 369 m (1,211 ft) above sea level. The Ohře River flows along the northern municipal border.

== History ==
The first written mention of Peruc is from 1170. Until the Hussite Wars, the village was owned by the Strahov Monastery, then the owners often changed. The village was looted several times during the Thirty Years' War. From 1814 to 1945, Peruc was property of the Thun und Hohenstein family. The municipality was promoted to a market town in 1898.

== Demographics ==
Historical population

Year	Pop.	±%
1869	4,124	—
1880	4,491	+8.9%
1890	4,691	+4.5%
1900	4,962	+5.8%
1910	5,160	+4.0%

Year	Pop.	±%
1921	4,930	−4.5%
1930	4,974	+0.9%
1950	3,612	−27.4%
1961	3,390	−6.1%
1970	3,043	−10.2%

Year	Pop.	±%
1980	2,565	−15.7%
1991	2,085	−18.7%
2001	2,068	−0.8%
2011	2,118	+2.4%
2021	2,313	+9.2%

Source: Censuses

== Transport ==
Peruc is located on the railway line Louny–Vrbičany.

== Sights ==
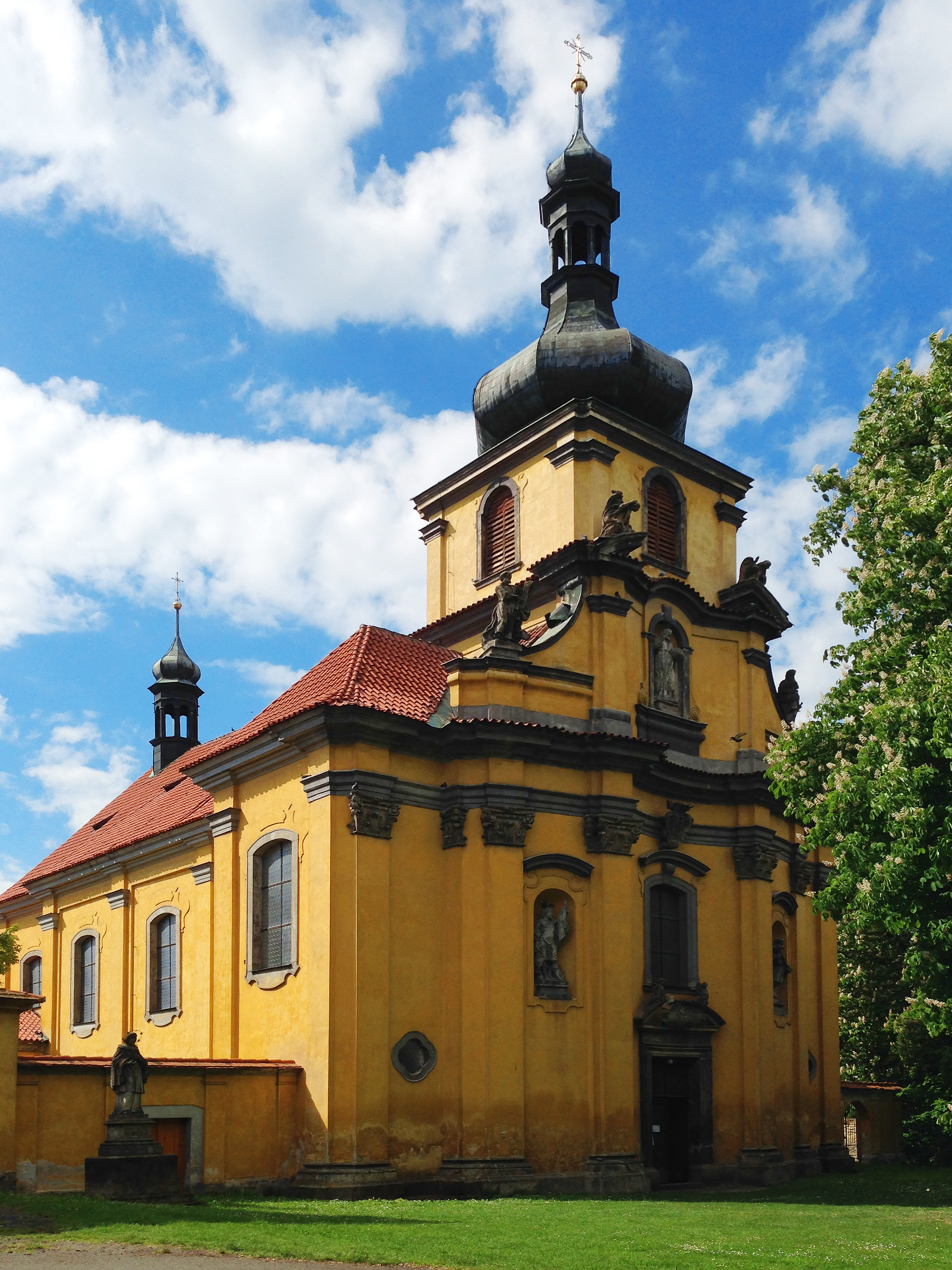
Church of Saints Peter and Paul

The Church of Saints Peter and Paul is among the main landmarks of Peruc. It was built in the Baroque style in 1722–1725.

The Peruc Castle was built on the site of an old fortress at the end of the 16th century. The Renaissance building was completely rebuilt in the Baroque style in the first half of the 18th century. It is a valuable and relatively large rural castle surrounded by a park. The southern wing houses the memorial hall of Emil Filla, who lived here, with his paintings. In the castle park is the Museum of the Czech Village, located in a former baroque granary from the end of the 18th century.

The 1,000-year-old Oldřich Oak tree is located in Peruc. It has a circumference of 810 cm (320 in) and a height of 30 m (98 ft).

== Notable people ==
- Bedřich Schnirch (1791–1868), engineer
- Emil Filla (1882–1953), painter; lived and worked here in 1947–1952
