= Antonín Pavel Wagner =

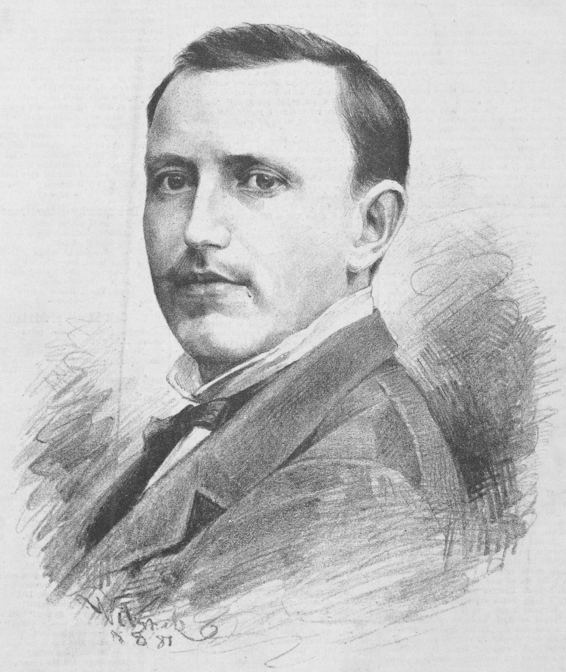
Antonín Pavel Wagner, portrait by Jan Vilímek (1881)

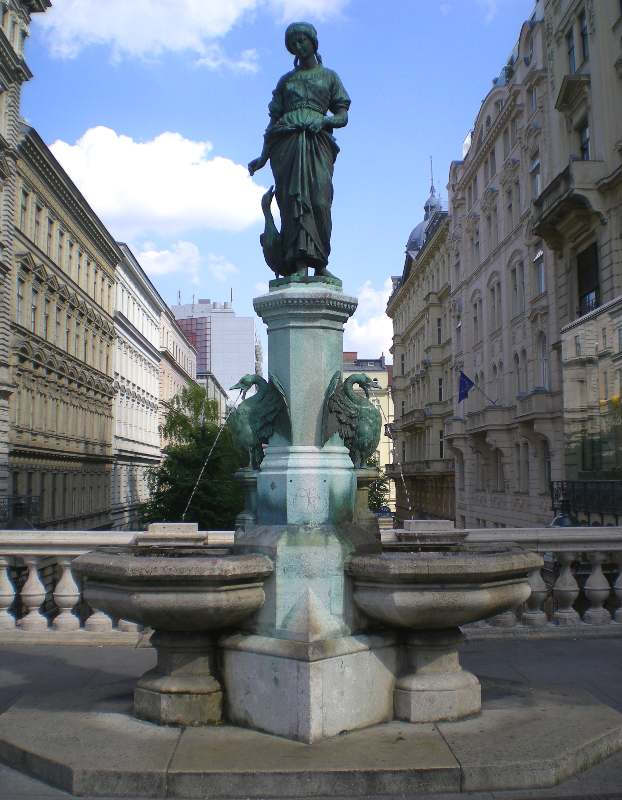
Goose Girl Fountain, Mariahilf district

Antonín Pavel Wagner (3 July 1834 in Dvůr Králové nad Labem – 27 January 1895 in Vienna) was a Czech sculptor who spent most of his career in Vienna.

== Life and work ==
His family was involved in the textile industry. After completing secondary school, he entered the firm of Adolf Dittrich, a canvas merchant in Prague, to learn the trade. In his free time, he painted and drew. In 1851, he left to study with the sculptor, Josef Max. He spent six years in his studio as an assistant; working on commissions in Hradec Králové, Kutná Hora, and his hometown.

In 1857, he moved to Vienna, where he enrolled at the Academy of Fine Arts and studied with Franz Bauer. During his time there, he received three awards; one for a fountain in front of the Mariahilfer Kirche. In 1868, he took an extended study trip through Germany, Dalmatia and Italy. Although he came to enjoy great respect in the artistic community, his commissions were relatively few.

He was given an award at the 1873 Vienna World's Fair and, the following year, represented Viennese sculptors at a celebration of the 400th anniversary of the birth of Michelangelo in Florence. He was honored with another award at the Exposition Universelle (1878), in Paris.

Although he spent most of his life in Vienna, he often expressed his attachment to his homeland; participating in the decoration of both the National Theater and the National Museum in Prague. However, due to the small demand for monumental sculpture in Bohemia, he achieved little fame there until his work on the Theatre, when he was already forty-seven years old. He became a full member of the Academy of Fine Arts, Prague, and an "extraordinary member" of the Czech Academy of Sciences and Arts.

The majority of his works can be found in Vienna, including statues of writers and dramatists at the Burgtheater, a statue of Herbard VIII von Auersperg at the Museum of Military History, several fountains, and two allegorical statues at the Vienna City Hall.
