= Oldřich Oak =

Coordinates: 50°20′44.5″N 13°57′43.8″E

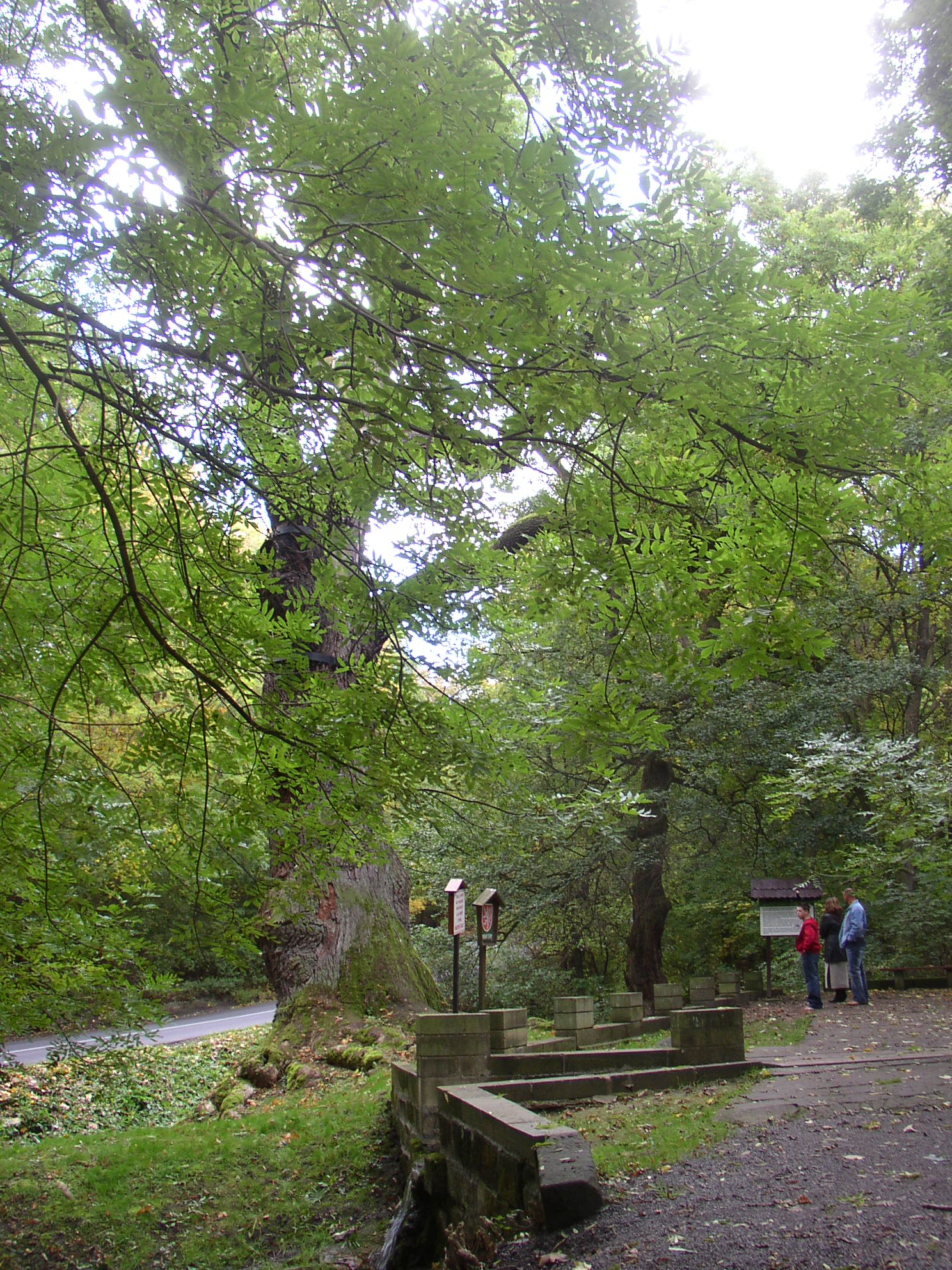
The Oldřich Oak in Peruc

The Oldřich Oak (Czech: Oldřichův dub), also known as the Prince Oldřich Oak, is a pedunculate oak (Quercus robur) tree in Peruc in the Czech Republic that is estimated to be about 1,000 years old. The tree has a height of 30 m (100 ft) and a trunk circumference of 810 cm (320 in).

== Legend ==
The tree derives its name from a legend, set in the 11th century, involving Oldřich, Duke of Bohemia and Božena, the mother of his only son. According to the legend, Oldřich set out on a hunt and travelled to Peruc. There, he spied a beautiful peasant girl, Božena, by a well (known today as Božena's spring) and was immediately entranced by her. Oldřich abandoned his hunt and took Božena back to Prague, and she eventually gave birth to his son Bretislaus. In the legend, Oldřich's first meeting with Božena took place in sight of the Oldřich Oak.

The Oldřich Oak is mentioned in the Chronicle of Dalimil.

== See also ==
- List of oldest trees
