= Milos Reindl =

Czech-Canadian artist and graphic designer

- Milos Reindl
- Born: December 13, 1923; Prague, Czechoslovakia
- Died: March 2, 2002 (aged 78); Montreal, Canada
- Education: Academy of Arts, Architecture and Design in Prague
- Known for: Painting, drawing, graphic design

Milos Reindl (Czech name: Miloš Reindl) was a Czech-Canadian artist and graphic designer. He is best known for his large-scale paintings and film posters. Trained in the ateliers of Emil Filla and Antonín Kýbal, Reindl left Czechoslovakia in 1968 and emigrated to Canada as a political refugee.

Following in the tradition of Czech Cubism, Reindl's style was greatly influenced by European modern art, in particular Pablo Picasso, Henri Matisse, Marc Chagall and Jean Dubuffet.

== Early life ==
Born in Czechoslovakia in 1923, Reindl studied at the Academy of Arts, Architecture and Design in Prague, under the tutelage of the avant-garde artist Emil Filla and the textile artist Antonín Kýbal. Reindl graduated in 1951 and married Helena Pokorná, a fellow art student and niece of the sculptor Karel Pokorný, in that same year.

== Early work ==
In 1957, Reindl began working for a Prague advertising studio as a graphic artist, specializing in film posters. At that time, the cost of importing international film posters to Czechoslovakia was prohibitively expensive, and local artists like Reindl were employed to create their own interpretations, often without seeing the films. During the late 50s and early 60s, Reindl created dozens of posters for films such as 12 Angry Men (1957 film), Murder, She Said and Admiral Ushakov (film).

== Emigration to Canada ==
Following the Soviet invasion of Czechoslovakia in 1968, Reindl emigrated to Montreal, Canada as a political refugee. In the early 1970s he began a career as an art professor, teaching for nearly thirty years at Laval University. During his years as a teacher, Reindl continued to paint, creating hundreds of oil paintings, gouaches, and drawings over the course of his career, however his work was only shared with only a few close friends until after his death in 2002.

== Artistic style ==
Emil Filla's influence on Reindl’s work can be seen in his flattened perspective and bold use of color, typical hallmarks of Czech Cubism. Reindl's work stands out for the bold lines of his drawings and the almost Baroque compositions, which are filled with apparently random details.

== Exhibitions ==
- 2002: "Milos Reindl: une célébration de vie," Université de Montréal, Montreal, Canada
- 2003: Milos Reindl Retrospective, Saint Bruno, Canada
- 2004: Milos Reindl Retrospective, Prague Castle, Czech Republic
- 2016: "Do Not Pass By," Prague, Czech Republic, Film Posters
- 2016: "Do Not Pass By," Montreal, Canada, Film Posters
