= Franz Bauer (sculptor) =

Austrian sculptor (1798–1872)

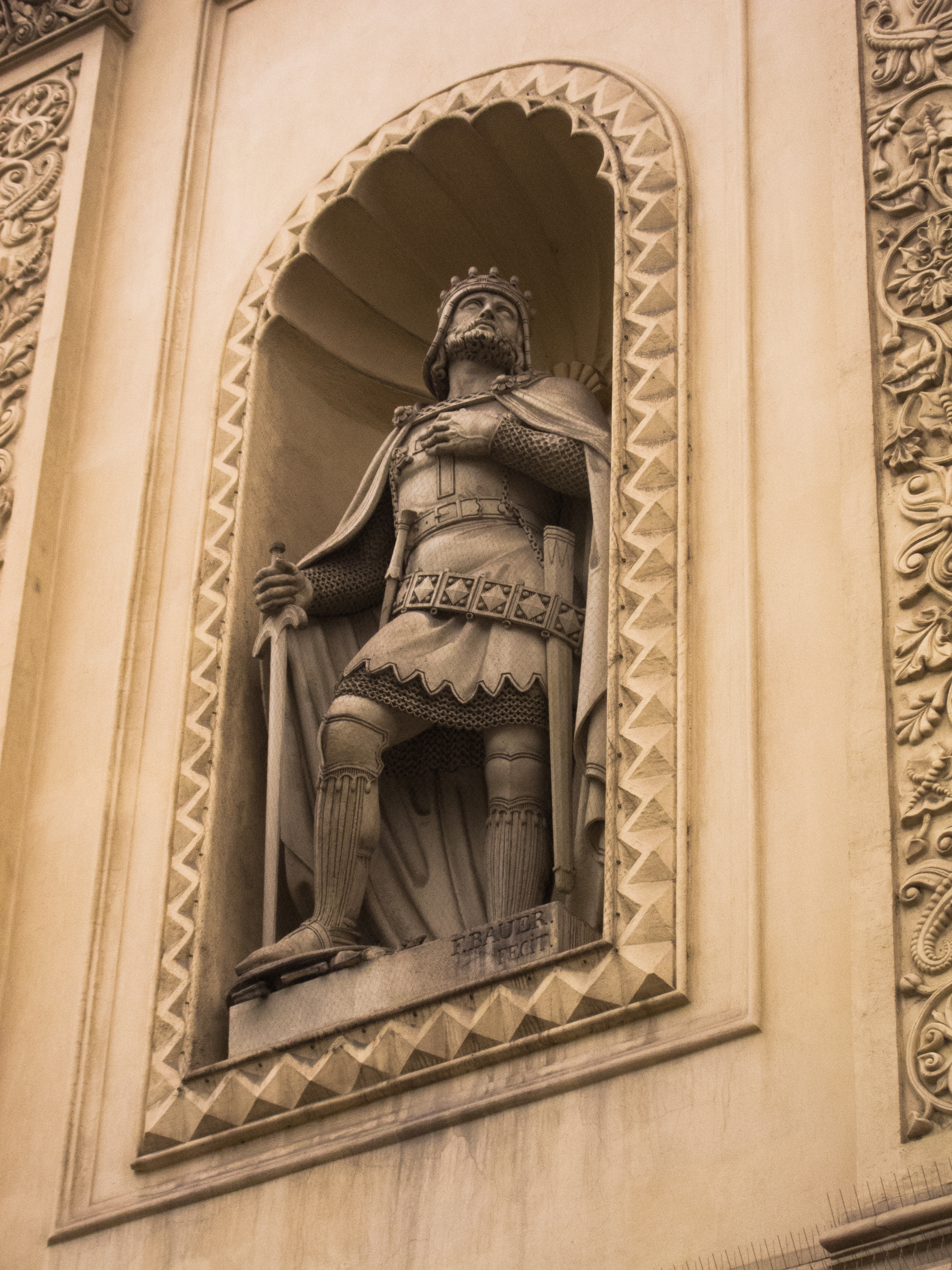
St. Ferdinand, Johann Nepomuk Church, Vienna

Franz Bauer (1798, Vienna – 14 March 1872, Vienna) was an Austrian sculptor in the late Classical style.

== Life and work ==
From 1814, he studied at the Academy of Fine Arts, Vienna, with Johann Nepomuk Schaller then, after 1815, worked in the studios of Josef Klieber. A travel grant enabled him to study in Rome, where he worked with Bertel Thorvaldsen.

He returned to Vienna in 1842 and taught at the academy. He was appointed a professor at the preparatory school in 1852 and, from 1865, headed the general sculpture school.

His best known students included Carl Kundmann, Antonín Pavel Wagner, Johannes Benk, Rudolf Weyr and Viktor Oskar Tilgner.

== Selected works ==
- Pieta (marble), Kunsthistorisches Museum, 1841/1842
- St. Ferdinand, niche figure, Johann Nepomuk Church, 1844
- Saintly figure on the portal of the Altlerchenfelder Pfarrkirche, c.1858

== Sources ==
- Biography by W. Krause @ the Österreichisches Biographisches Lexikon
