= Bedřich Schnirch =

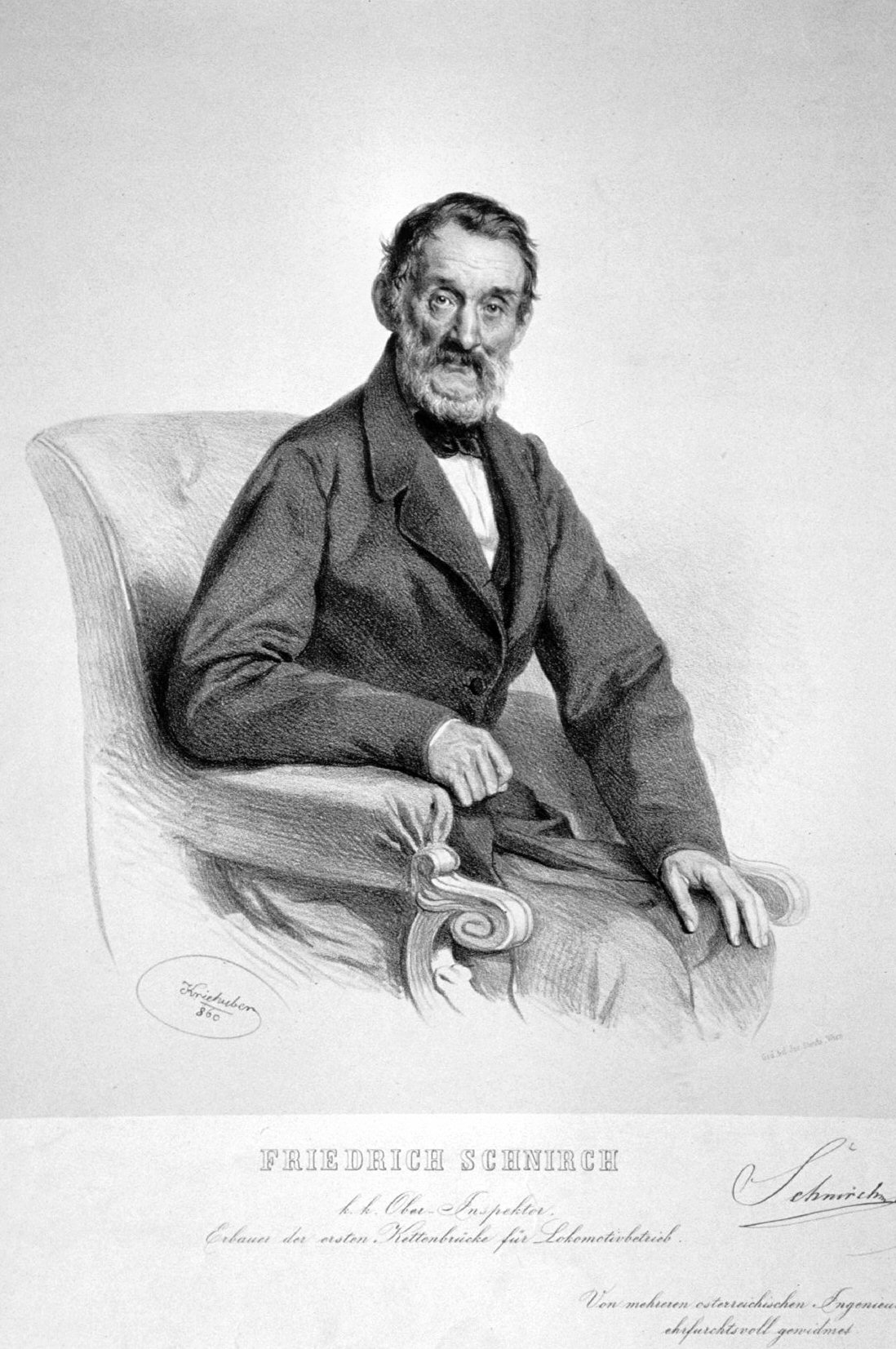
Bedřich Schnirch; portrait by Josef Kriehuber (1860)

Bedřich Schnirch, or Friedrich Franz Schnirch (7 June 1791, Pátek – 25 November 1868, Vienna) was a Czech engineer, builder, Imperial Councilor, and Chief Inspector for the State Railways; primarily known for designing chain bridges. His nephew, Josef Emanuel Schnirch, was also a well known builder; and his grand-nephew was the sculptor, Bohuslav Schnirch.

== Life and work ==
Schnirch attended primary school in Horn and Krems an der Donau. From 1819 to 1821, he continued his studies at the k.k. Polytechnic Institute (now the Vienna University of Technology), where he worked with Johann von Kudriaffsky; who later oversaw the repair and rebuilding of several bridges in Vienna.

In 1821, he entered the service of Count Franz Anton von Magnis (1786–1861), owner of an estate in Strážnice, where he would manage the reconstruction of historic buildings. His first assignment, however, involved building an access road to an extension of the Count's park; on the opposite side of a river. Schnirch proposed what was then a technical novelty: a chain bridge, none of which had yet been built in that part of Europe. From 1826, he began applying the same principles to the construction of fireproof hanging iron roofs.

After 1827, Schnirch was employed by the Civil Service. In 1842, he became Chief Engineer at the Vienna Railway Directorate. In 1848, he was one of the founders of the Austrian Association of Engineers, which became the Austrian Union of Engineers and Architects in 1864. He was awarded a patent for a type of suspension bridge in 1858. The following year, he became a Section Chief at the Ministry of Commerce, Industry and Public Works. After 1861, he was Chief Inspector for railway structures; in which position he also helped plan a rail line from Olomouc to Prague. He retired in 1863, and was awarded a Knight's Cross in the Order of Franz Joseph.

Schnirch died at the age of seventy-seven, from what was called "Altersschwäche" (old-age weakness). In 1888, a street in Vienna's Landstraße district was named after him.

In the use of chain bridges, some design defects emerged in later years: the underestimation of the traffic load, and the insufficient consideration of lateral wind forces, which led to the demolition or reconstruction of numerous bridges, including some by Schnirch. Perhaps the most notable example was the "Bridge of Emperor Franz I", completed in 1841; becoming only the second permanent bridge over the Vltava, after the Charles Bridge from the 15th century. It was in service until 1898, when it was replaced with the current stone bridge; known since 1919 as the Legion Bridge, in honor of the Czechoslovak Legion.
