= National Theatre (Prague) =

Theatre in Czech Republic

- Národní divadlo

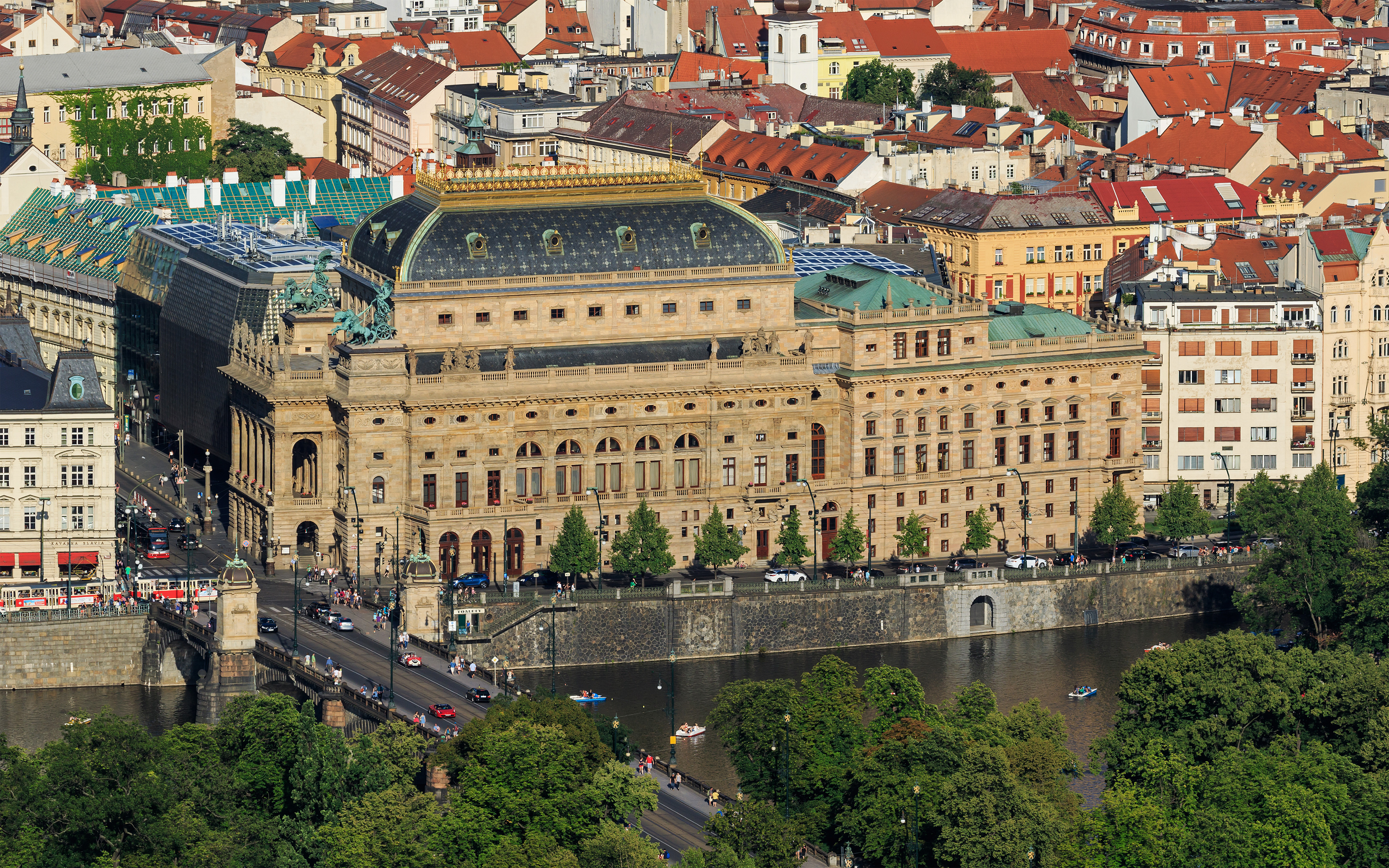
- Interactive map of National Theatre
- Address: Národní 223/2
- Location: Prague, Czech Republic
- Coordinates: 50°4′52″N 14°24′49″E
- Owner: Ministry of Culture
- Capacity: 986

Construction
- Opened: 11 June 1881
- Reopened: 18 November 1883
- Rebuilt: 1977–1983
- Architects: Josef Zítek, Josef Schulz

Website
- www.narodni-divadlo.cz

The National Theatre (Czech: Národní divadlo) is a historic opera house in Prague, Czech Republic. It is known as the alma mater of Czech opera, and as the national monument of Czech history and art.

The National Theatre belongs to notable Czech cultural institutions with a rich artistic tradition, which helped to preserve and develop the Czech language and a sense for a Czech musical and dramatic way of thinking.

Today the National Theatre consists of three artistic ensembles: opera, ballet and drama. They alternate in their performances in the historic building of the National Theatre, in the State Opera, in the Estates Theatre and in the Kolowrat Theatre. All three artistic ensembles select their repertoire both from classical heritage, and modern authors.

== Initial design and construction, 1844 to 1881 ==
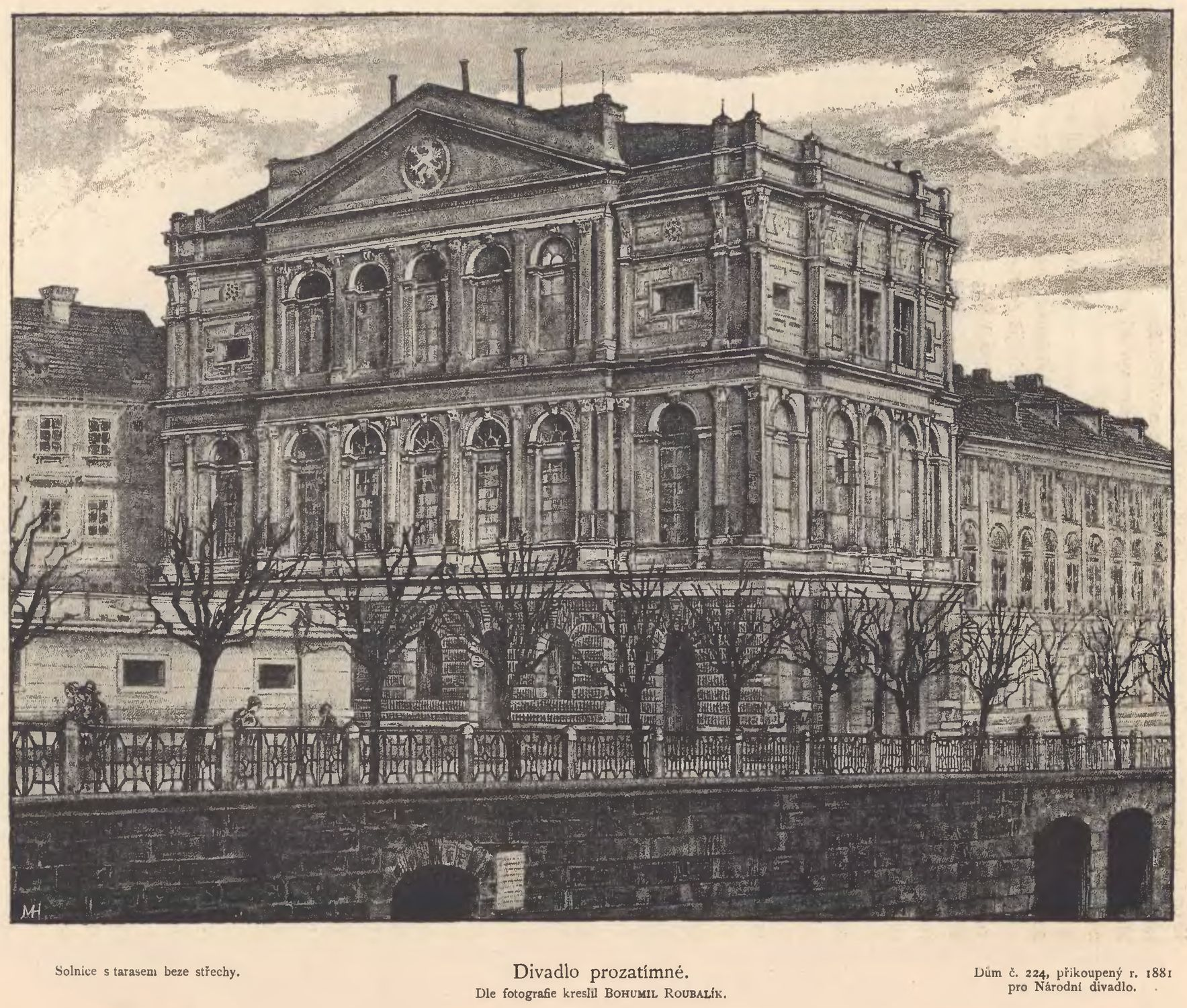
Prague Provisional Theatre on historic painting

The cornerstone of the National Theatre was laid on 16 May 1868, but the idea of building a theatre dates back to the autumn of 1844 at the gatherings of patriots in Prague. An application was submitted by František Palacký to the Provincial Committee of the Bohemian Assembly on 29 January 1845, requesting "the privilege of constructing, furnishing, maintaining and managing" of an independent Czech theatre. The application was granted in April 1845, but it was not until six years later – in April 1851 – that the founding Society for the Establishment of a Czech National Theatre in Prague made the first public appeal to start a collection. A year later the proceeds went toward the purchase of land belonging to a former salt works covering an area of not quite 28 acres (11 ha) which determined the magnificent site of the theatre on the banks of the river Vltava facing the panorama of Prague Castle, but at the same time the cramped area and trapezium shape posed challenging problems for the designers of the building.

The era of von Bach absolutism brought to a halt preparations for the envisaged theatre and supported the concept of a modest provisional building, which was erected on the south side of the theatre parcel by architect Vojtěch Ignác Ullmann and opened on 18 November 1862. The premiere of the famous opera The Bartered Bride took place at the Provisional Theatre on 30 May 1866. The building then became a constituent part of the final version of the National Theatre; its outside cladding is visible to this day in the elevated section of the rear part of the building, and the interior layout was only obliterated following the latest reconstruction of the National Theatre in 1977 – 1983.

Simultaneously with the realization of this minimal programme asserted by F.L. Rieger and the Provincial Committee, the young progressive advocates of the original ambitious concept of the building (Sladkovský, Tyrš, Neruda, Hálek) launched an offensive. In 1865 these men attained leading positions in the Society and requested the 33-year-old professor of civil engineering at the Prague Technical College, architect Josef Zítek, to draft a design for the National Theatre. He then came out on top in a later-declared open competition, and in 1867 construction work began.

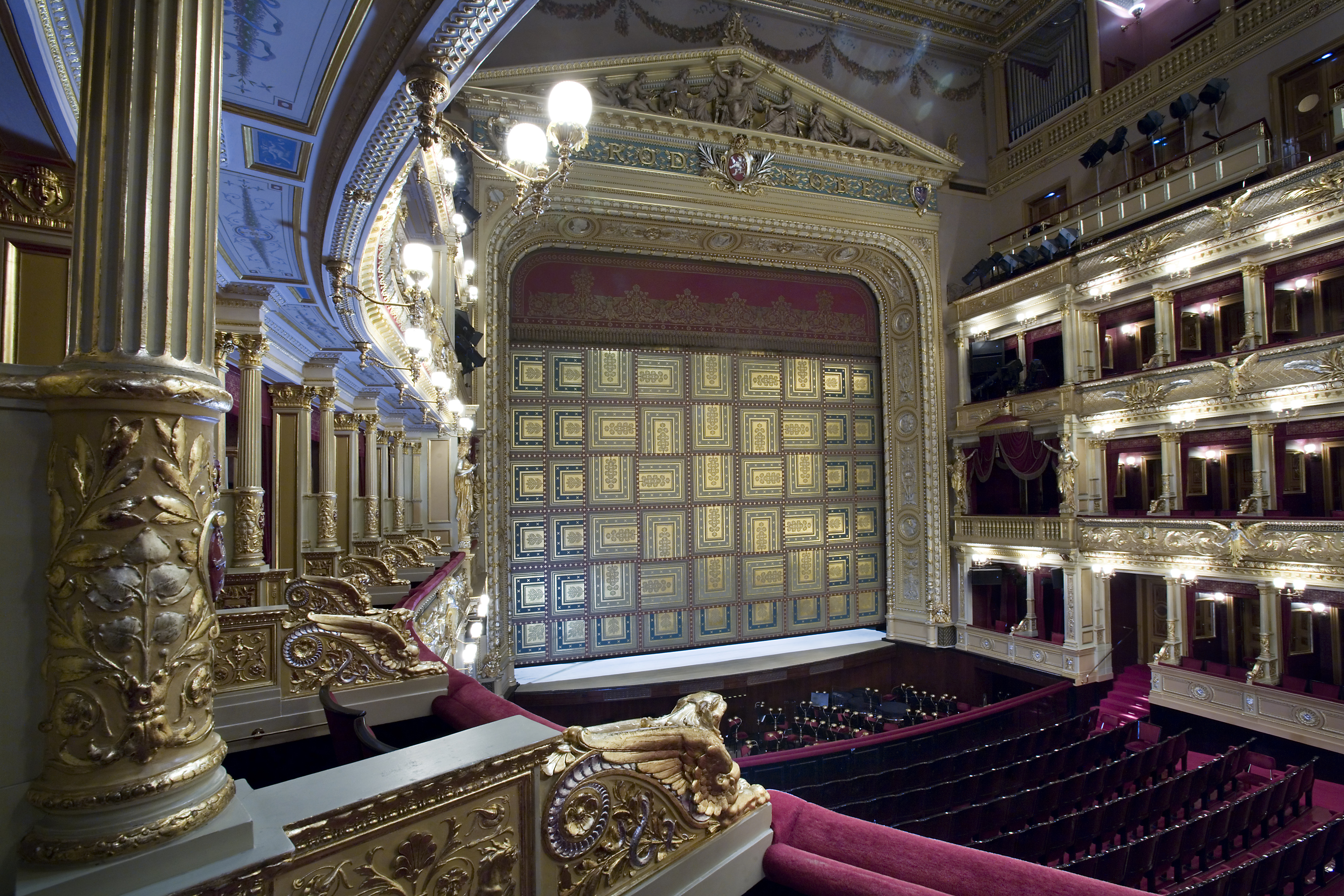
Interior of the National Theatre

On 16 May 1868, the foundation stone was laid, and in November the foundations were completed. In 1875, the new building reached its full height and in 1877 the theatre was roofed over. As of 1873 there was an ongoing competition for the interior decoration of the building, the scenario of which had been elaborated by a special commission under the leadership of Sladkovský. On the one hand, the themes were in the spirit of the Neo-Renaissance concept of a classic building. On the other hand, they were inspired by the current enthusiasm for Slavonic mythology and the stories of the Manuscripts; both of these concepts were based on Josef Mánes' paintings and connected with the contemporary style of romantic landscape painting (also linked to Czech history). They provided the fundamental ideology guiding artistic expression, which today is described as the art of the generation of the National Theatre.

The theatre includes a triga (a three-horse chariot) and 10 exterior allegorical sculptures by Bohuslav Schnirch, 10 more exterior pieces by Antonín Pavel Wagner, the stone pieces by Max Verich and an interior sculpted pediment group over the proscenium arch by Schnirch.

=== Grand opening and fire ===
The National Theatre was opened for the first time on 11 June 1881, to honour the visit of Crown Prince Rudolf of Austria. Bedřich Smetana's opera Libuše was given its world premiere, conducted by Adolf Čech. Another 11 performances were presented after that. Then the theatre was closed down to enable the completion of the finishing touches. While this work was under way a fire broke out on 12 August 1881, which destroyed the copper dome, the auditorium and the stage of the theatre.

The fire was seen as a national catastrophe and was met with a mighty wave of determination to take up a new collection: Within 47 days a million florins were collected. This national enthusiasm, however, did not correspond to the behind-the-scenes battles that flared up following the catastrophe. Architect Josef Zítek was no longer in the running, and his pupil architect Josef Schulz was summoned to work on the reconstruction. He was the one to assert the expansion of the edifice to include the block of flats belonging to Dr. Polák that was situated behind the building of the Provisional Theatre. He made this building a part of the National Theatre and simultaneously changed somewhat the area of the auditorium to improve visibility. He did, however, take into account with utmost sensitivity the style of Zítek's design, and so he managed to merge three buildings by various architects to form an absolute unity of style.

== Reconstruction and reopening, 1883 to 1977 ==
The theatre seen from Střelecký Island, between 1883 and 1899

The interior artwork was done by Mikoláš Aleš and František Ženíšek. The building of the National Theatre was inaugurated on 18 November 1883. The building, with perfect technical equipment (electric illumination, a steel-constructed stage), served without any extensive modifications for almost one hundred years. It was only on 1 April 1977, following a performance of the Lantern by Jirásek, that the theatre was closed down for six years.

== Additional reconstruction, 1977 to 1983 and after ==
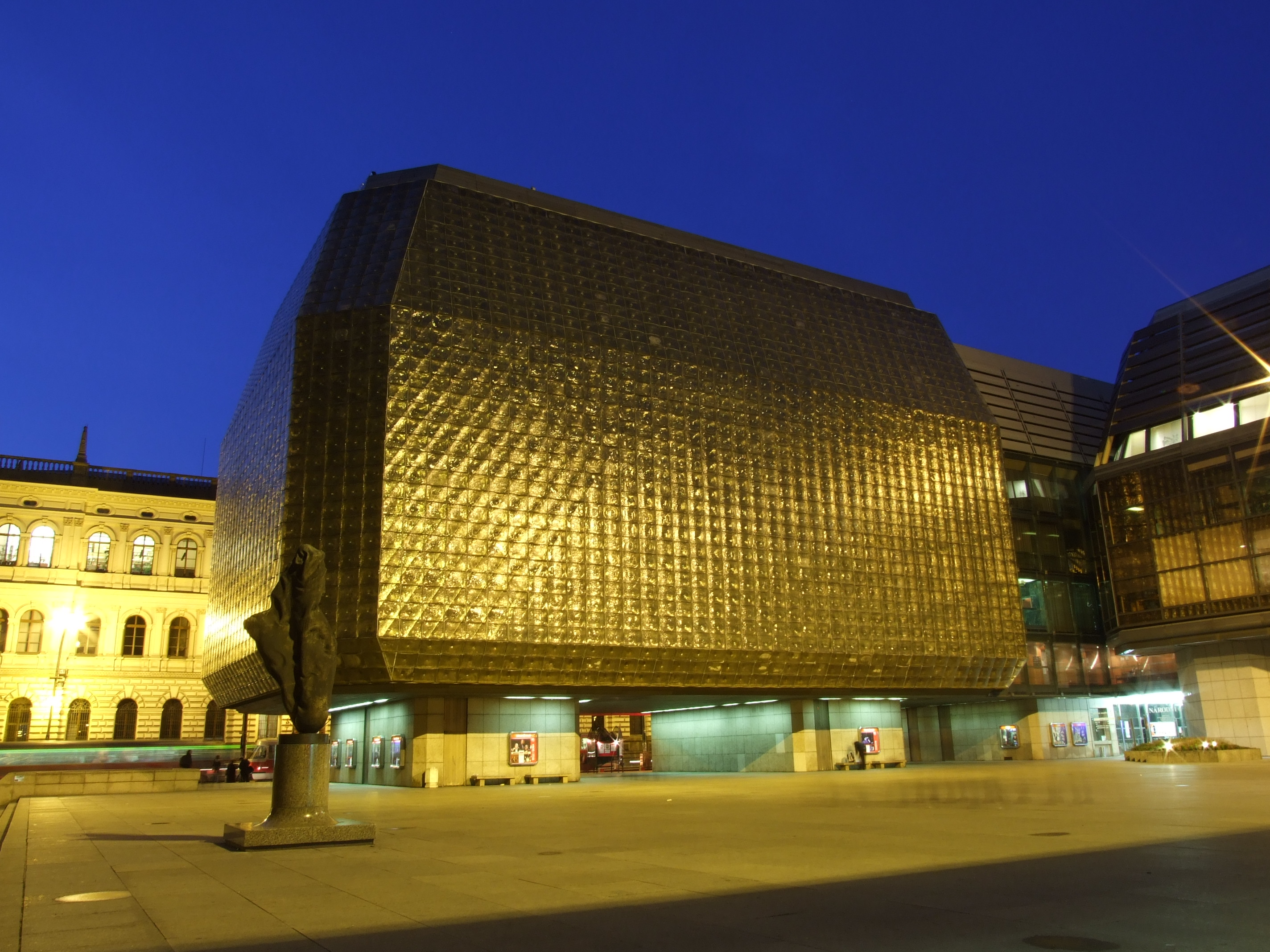
New stage of the theatre, built in the 1980s

Architect Karel Prager was appointed to take charge of the overall reconstruction work. This extensive project was combined with the completion of work on the entire setting of the theatre. The work was completed to meet an important deadline, which was the date of the 100th anniversary of the opening of the National Theatre: 18 November 1983. On that day the theatre was handed over to the public again with a performance of Smetana’s Libuše.

The historic building, noted for its beautiful architecture, also includes an annex of modern design which contains offices and the main box office. Today it functions as the main stage of the three artistic ensembles of the National Theatre: drama, opera and ballet.

In 1989 the general director of the National Theatre, composer Jiří Pauer was dismissed from his post because of his support for the policies of the former Communist Czechoslovak government. Pauer locked all staff out of the National and Smetana theatres on 17 November 1989 to prevent members of the opera, ballet and drama companies from staging protest performances. After a three-week strike Pauer was replaced by Ivo Žídek.

== Management ==
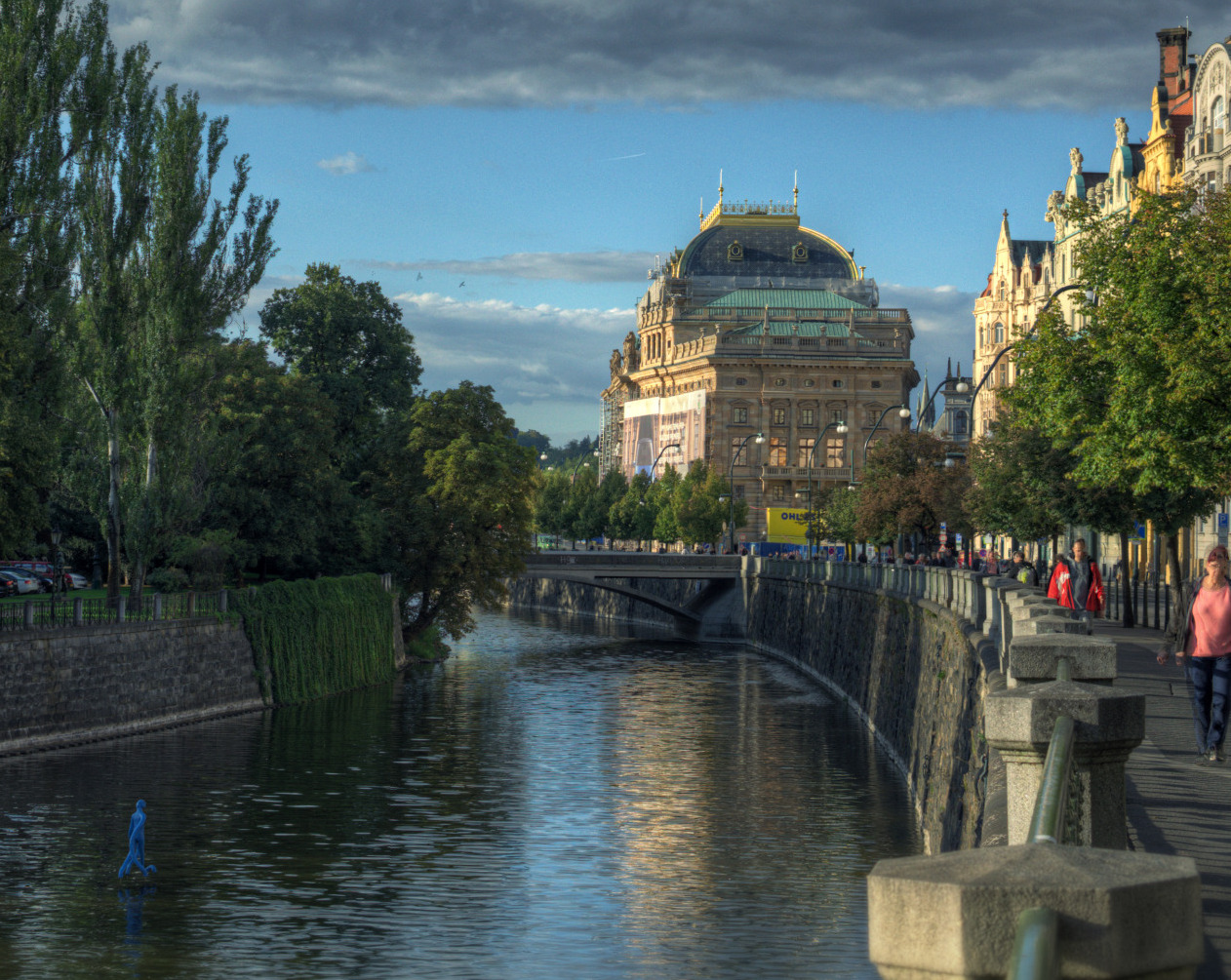
National Theatre in Prague

At first the National Theatre was supported by a private guild of individuals with a director managing its affairs on behalf of the guild. Lack of subsidy caused some financial and artistic difficulties, but without long-term damage to the growth or status of the institution. In 1900 the contract for the guild which had steered the theatre through its early years was not renewed by the regional government, and as a result of growing dissatisfaction with the artistic levels, the National Theatre transferred its management to a new National Theatre Company. In addition, most of the people associated with the guild were considered to be conservative in outlook, while the new Company were liberals, receptive to fresh ideas.

The composer Karel Kovařovic was made opera director, and as a conductor, his work became noticeable in improvements in the orchestra, chorus and solo ensemble. He also attracted leading singers to the ensemble, such as Karel Burian (later a Wagnerian tenor at Bayreuth), Otakar Mařák, Emil Pollert, and Gabriela Horvatova. After the death of Kovařovic in 1920, Otakar Ostrčil took over, continuing the progressive artistic direction and leading a thorough renovation of the stagings. He began with the first performance of The Excursions of Mr. Brouček, and mounted Berg's Wozzeck immediately after its premiere, leading to a scandal and the threat of his dismissal.

The National Theatre is overseen by the director, and the advisory body of the Council of the National Theatre. The advisory board has 11 to 13 members, who are appointed and dismissed by the director. Current members of the council include: JUDr. Pavel Smutný, Prof. Dr. Dadja Altenburg Pešta Kohl, Ing. Petr Dvořák, Ing. Jiří Maceška, JUDr. Vlasta Formánková, Ing. Bohdan Wojnar, Prof. Ing. Jiří Drahoš, DrSc., dr.h.c., Pavel Kohout, Ing. Oldřich Černoch CSc. and Ing. Peter Palečka.

In 2019 the National Theatre and State Opera in Prague were the place of protests and disruption by artists and staff, including an open letter complaining at the 'non-transparent' appointment of Per Boye Hansen as Artistic Director.

== Komerční banka Award ==
On 4 May 2005, Komerční banka signed an agreement with the National Theatre in Prague to annually honour the most prominent acts performed at the Czech National Theatre in overall three categories – ballet, drama and opera. The recipients of the KOBANADI Award (KOBANADI = KOmerční BAnka + NArodní DIvadlo) receive a statuette designed by the academic Jaroslav Róna, 100,000 Czech koruna (approx. €4,000 as of March 2011). The first ceremony was held on 26 October 2006 at the stage of the National Theatre.

== See also ==
- National Theatre Ballet (Prague)
