= Peroutka =

Peroutka (Czech feminine: Peroutková) is a Czech surname. Notable people with the surname include:

- Ferdinand Peroutka (1895–1978), Czech journalist and writer
- Michael Peroutka (born 1952), American politician
- Stephen J. Peroutka (born 1954), American neurologist and pharmacologist)
