= Milada Součková =

- Born: 24 January 1899; Prague, Bohemia, Austria-Hungary
- Died: 1 February 1983 (aged 84); Cambridge, Massachusetts, United States
- Spouse: Zdenek Rykr
- Writing career
- Subjects: History, poetry, fiction

Milada Součková (24 January 1899 – 1 February 1983) was a Czech writer, literary historian and diplomat. She is known mainly for introducing to Czech literature Modernist techniques employed by English-language writers such as Laurence Sterne, James Joyce, and Virginia Woolf.

== Life ==
Milada Součková was born into a wealthy family in Prague. She studied at the prestigious Minerva High School together with Milena Jesenská. From 1918 she studied science at Charles University in Prague, graduating in 1923 with a thesis on plant life. In 1923–24 she attended the University of Lausanne and met her future husband, the painter Zdenek Rykr. She wrote for several newspapers and journals, met the Russian linguist Roman Jakobson, and in 1936 became a member of the Prague Linguistic Circle. In 1940 her husband committed suicide to avoid falling into the hands of the Gestapo, and Součková left Prague to live in the countryside. During the occupation, she collaborated with writer Vladislav Vančura on his monumental work Obrazy z dějin národa českého (Pictures From the History of the Czech Nation) until Vančura was arrested by the Gestapo.

In 1945, after World War II, she was appointed cultural attaché at the Czechoslovak Embassy in Washington. In protest of the Czechoslovak coup d'état of 1948, she remained in the United States as an émigré. Jakobson helped her to enter an academic career in Czech studies, serving between 1950 and 1962 at Harvard University, then at the University of Chicago, and from 1970 to 1973 at the University of California, Berkeley. In 1959, she was awarded a Guggenheim Fellowship for the study of Slavic literature. For the rest of her life, she worked as a librarian at Harvard's Widener Library. In 1986, after her death, Harvard College established the Milada Součkova Bequest, "for the purchase and use of Czech and Slovak books for the Harvard University Library known as Widener Library."

== Author ==
The first literary experiments of Milada Součková were influenced by James Joyce and surrealism. Most of her prose work is stream of consciousness, imaginative, but sober. In her best works she experiments with language, but describes mostly the common daily life. In the US, she wrote mostly poetry in Czech and theoretical works in English. At home, she was unable to publish her literary work, either under the Nazis or under the Communists. Her last novel, Neznámý člověk (1962), was published in exile. Her collected works in Czech were issued in 11 volumes, from 1995 to 1997 by ERM (První písmena and Amor a Psyché), then from 1997 to 2010 by Prostor (all the rest). In 2010, Prostor received a Magnesia Litera for Publishing Achievement, in recognition of the importance of publishing Součková's work.

== Publications ==
=== Novels ===
- První písmena (First Letters), 1934
- Amor a psyché (Amor and Psyche), 1937
- Odkaz (The Legacy), 1940
- Zakladatelé (The Founders), 1940
- Bel canto, 1944
- Hlava umělce (The Artist's Head), 1944
- Neznámý člověk (The Unknown Person), 1962; Der unbekannte Mensch (German translation; Stuttgart: Deutsche Verlags-Anstalt, 1999)

=== Poetry ===
- Gradus ad Parnassum (Steps to Parnassus), 1957
- Pastorální suita (Pastoral Suite), 1962
- Sešity Josephiny Rykrové (The Notebooks of Josephina Rykrová), 1981

=== Literary history ===
- A Literature in Crisis: Czech Literature 1938–1950 (New York: Mid-European Studies Center, National Committee for a Free Europe, 1954)
- The Czech Romantics (The Hague: Mouton & Co., 1958)
- The Parnassian Jaroslav Vrchlický (The Hague: Mouton & Co., 1964)
- A Literary Satellite: Czechoslovak-Russian Literary Relations (Chicago: University of Chicago Press, 1970)
- Baroque in Bohemia (Ann Arbor: University of Michigan Press, 1980)
