= Zdenek Rykr =

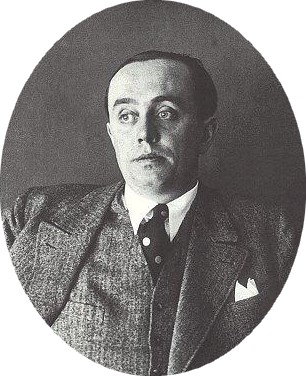
Zdenek Rykr in 1923

Zdenek Rykr (26 October 1900 – 15 January 1940) was a Czech painter, illustrator, journalist and theatre designer.

== Life ==
Zdenek Rykr was born in the Chotěboř train station. When he was seven his family moved to Kolín, where his father, a railway inspector, had been transferred. This is where he spent his childhood and student years. After graduating from the grammar school he was not accepted to the Academy of Fine Arts in Prague, and so he chose to study Art History and Classical archaeology at the faculty of philosophy, where he completed a doctorate in 1924. Despite the knowledge he accumulated during his studies, his artistic abilities were self-taught. At the beginning his artwork is mostly paintings, and subsequently evolves into graphic design.

== Work ==
In 1925, Rykr illustrated Emil Vachek's Bidýlko, and from 1925 to 1927 he was a theatre designer at the National Theatre (Prague). In parallel, he worked as a graphic designer for advertising, for example for the Bata company. His designs for the Maršner chocolate company, for which he created the blue Orion star for the Kofila chocolate wrapper, are still famous today. He also created designs for the Kolín oil refinery, Kulík coffee, Čedok and Škoda Auto.

His art gradually strayed from the realism of his early paintings, and from the 1930s he focused on the creation of assemblages and collages, which foreshadowed the styles of the 1960s. He got inspired by his numerous travels across the globe, and was strongly influenced by Surrealism and Oriental Calligraphy.

In the 1920s, he also worked as a journalist, contributed to the creation of the satiric magazine Trh, authored pamphlets, and in 1930–1931, edited the magazine Domov a svět. His pointed criticism and controversial opinions made him an unpopular figure in the 1920s and 30s. He is associated with the Devětsil generation of avant-garde artists rather as an outsider or lone wolf. He tried on many styles, which he quickly discarded as worthless. His generation saw him as a disjointed eclectic or as the dark conscience of the avant-garde.

At first, he exhibited as a guest with the Tvrdošíjní group of painters, and later had several solo shows and even exhibited his work at the Société des Artistes Indépendants Salon des indépendants in Paris, where unlike in his native country it was a great success.

To avoid the Gestapo he took his own life by throwing himself under a train in the Barrandov section of Prague on 15 January 1940.

His wife, Milada Součková (1898–1983) was a Czech writer, literary historian, and diplomat, known for introducing Modernist techniques to Czech literature.

== Bibliography ==
1. LAHODA, Vojtěch. Zdenek Rykr 1900-1940. Praha : Galerie hlavního města Prahy, 2000. 377 s. ISBN 80-7010-077-X (in Czech).
2. URBAN, Jiří. Zdenek Rykr : Výběr z malířského díla. Roudnice nad Labem : Galerie Roudnice nad Labem, 1983. 24 s.
