= Olšany Cemetery =

Graveyard in Prague, Czech Republic

- Olšanské hřbitovy
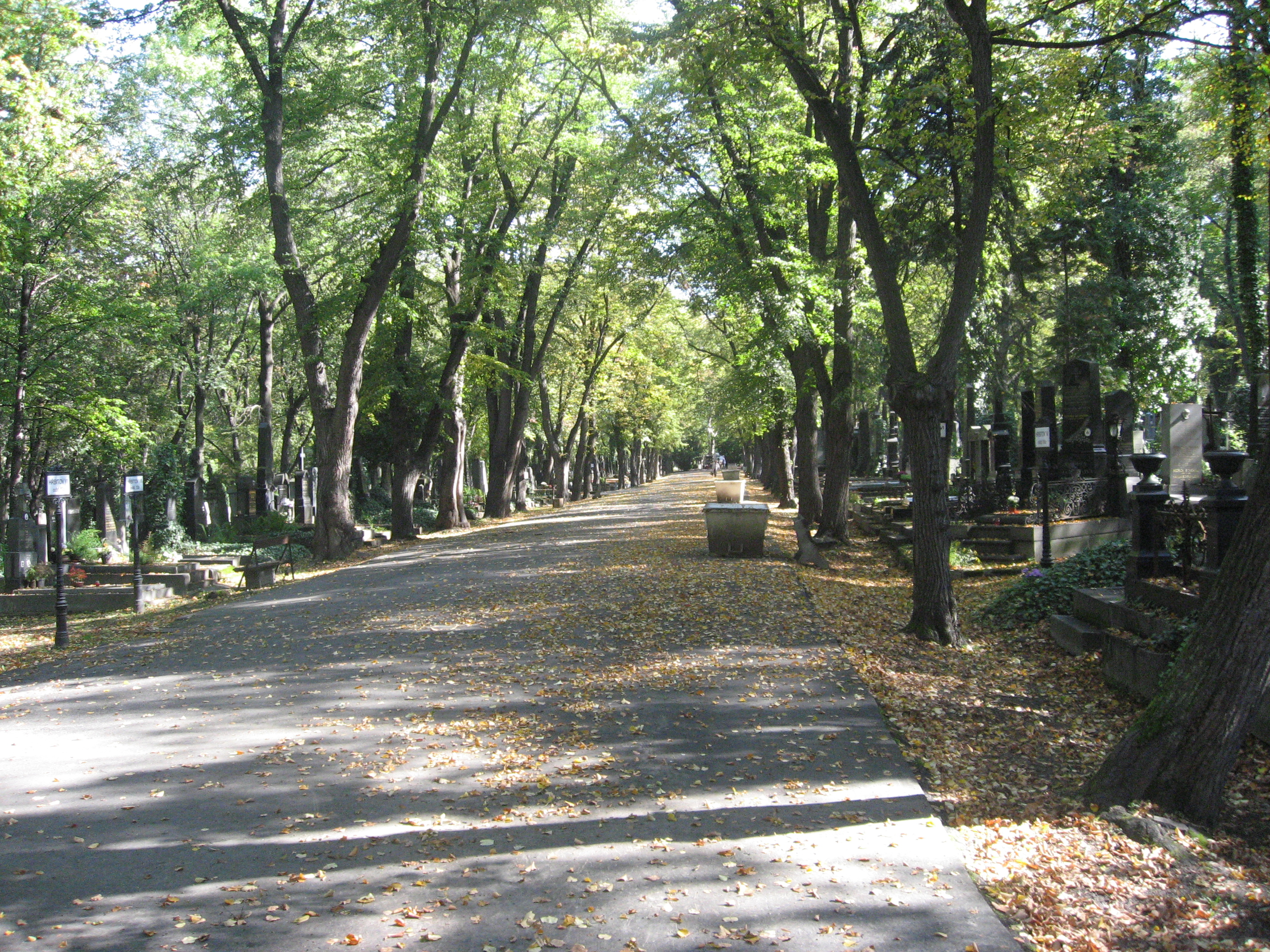
- Road through the Olšany Cemetery
- Interactive map of Olšany Cemetery

Details
- Established: 1680
- Location: Prague
- Country: Czech Republic
- Coordinates: 50°4′50″N 14°28′14″E
- Type: Public
- Size: 50.17 hectares (124 acres)
- No. of graves: 65,000

Olšany Cemetery (Czech: Olšanské hřbitovy, German: Wolschaner Friedhof) is a graveyard in Prague, Czech Republic. With an area of more than 50 ha (120 acres), it is the largest cemetery in the country. Since it was founded in 1680, around two million people have been buried here.

There are many architecturally valuable tombstones here, the most significant of which are those in the Art Nouveau style. The most valuable part is the honorary burial grounds of Allied armies and freedom fighters, which is protected as a national cultural monument.

== Location and organisation ==
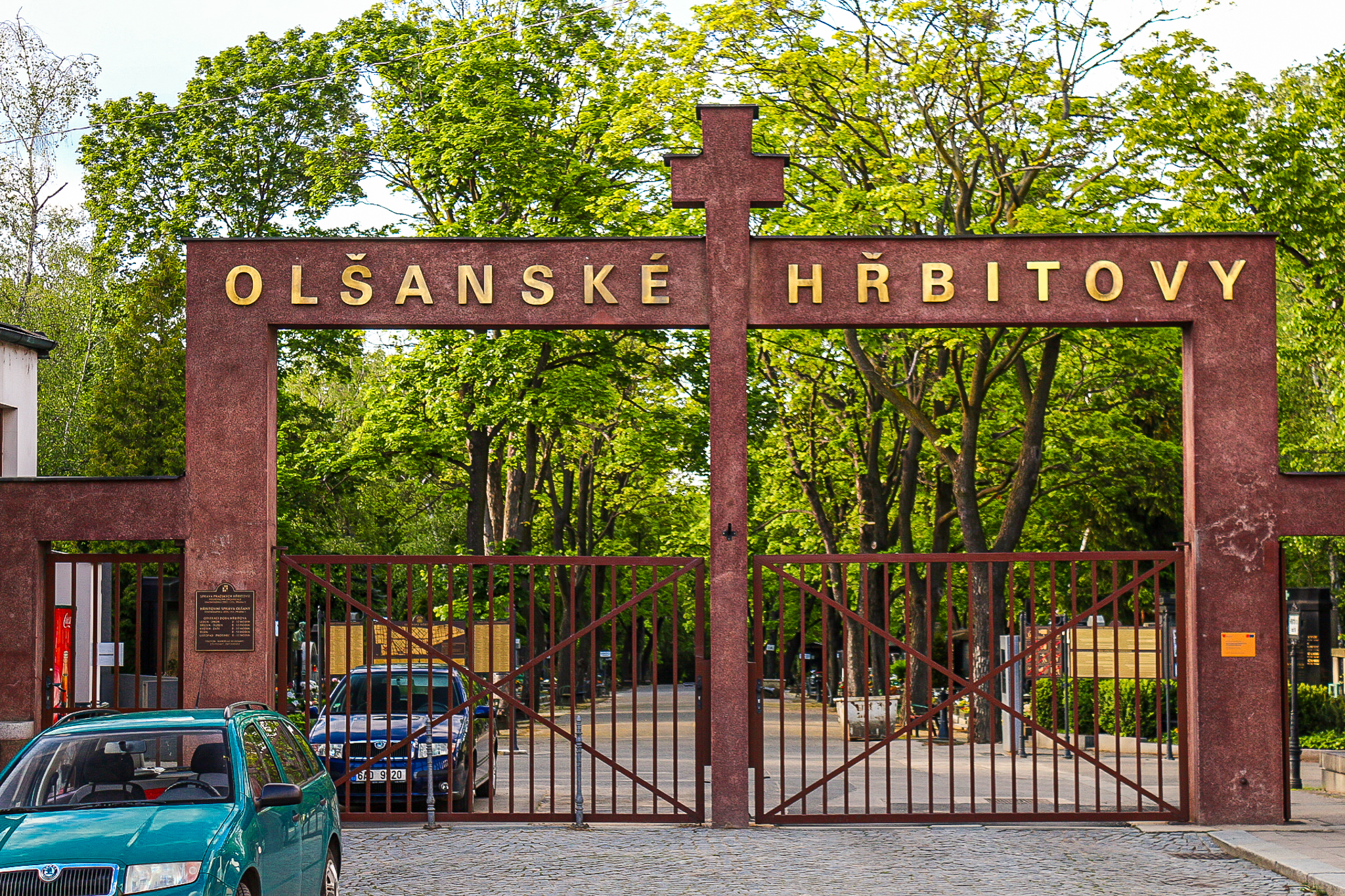
Main entrance

The Olšany Cemetery has an area of 50.17 ha (124 acres), making it the largest graveyard in the Czech Republic. It is located in the southern part of the Žižkov district of Prague.

The cemetery is divided into two main parts by Želivského Street, and these two parts are internally divided into several parts as the cemetery grew. Therefore, the cemetery is often referred to in the plural and its official Czech name is also in the plural. The western part is called Olšanské hřbitovy I. ('Olšany Cemeteries I') and is the main part of the cemetery, containing the fabrica ecclesiae cemeteries numbered II–IX and the Municipal Cemetery I. The eastern part is called Olšanské hřbitovy II. ('Olšany Cemeteries II') and contains the New Jewish Cemetery (the largest Jewish cemetery in the Czech Republic; forms a separate part of the Olšany Cemetery), the cemetery numbered X and the Municipal Cemetery II, which includes honorary burial grounds, an Orthodox section and a small Muslim section. Both main parts are surrounded by a wall, and only Cemetery I (the oldest part of the cemetery) is located outside the fenced cemetery in the northwestern part of the Olšany Cemetery.

The Olšany Cemetery contains approximately 25,000 tombs, 200 chapel tombs, 65,000 grave sites, 20,000 urn graves, six columbariums and two scattering meadows. It is estimated that two million people were buried here during the cemetery's existence.

== History ==
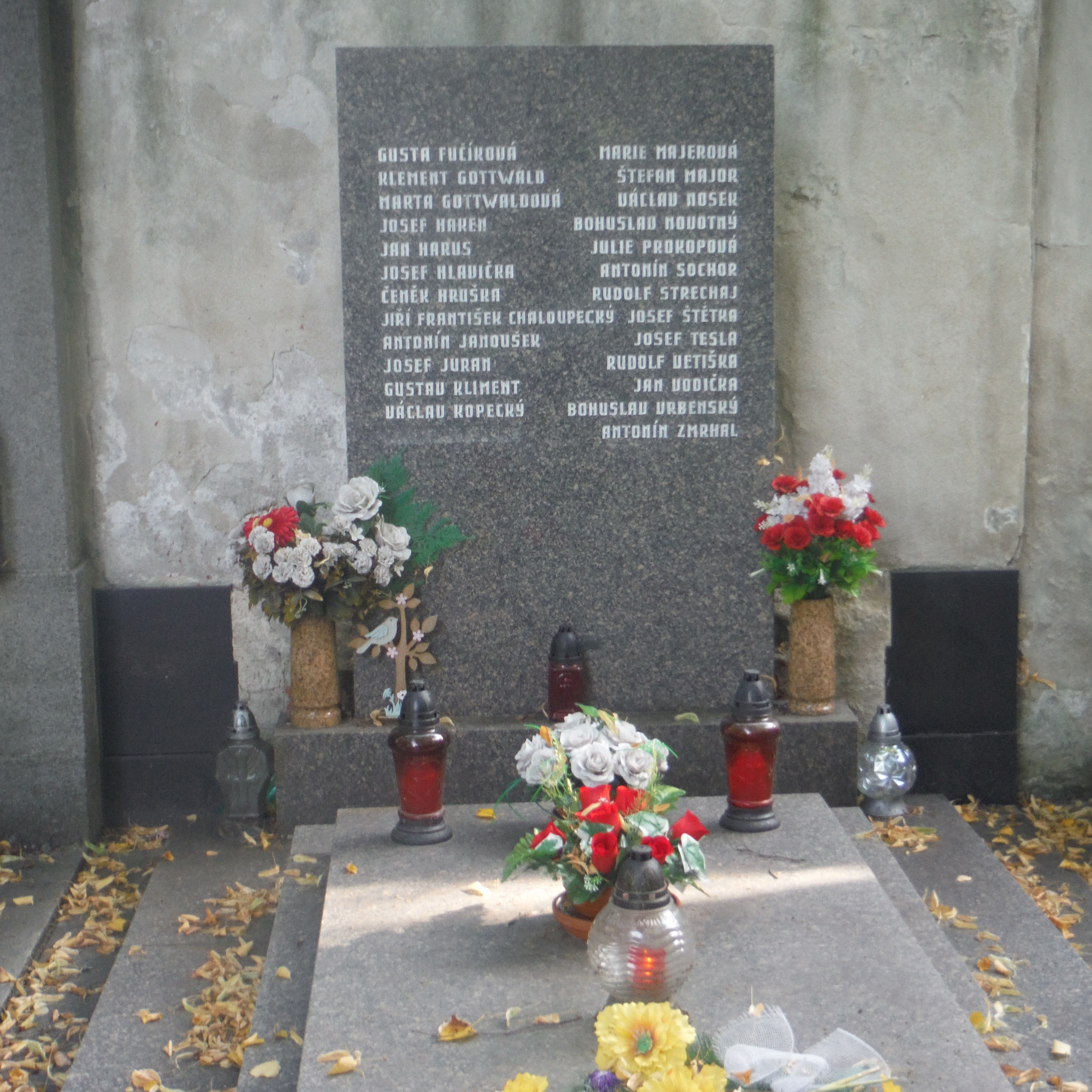
Grave of Czech communist politicians whose urns had originally been kept at the National Monument at Vítkov

The Olšany Cemetery was created in 1680 to accommodate Great Plague victims who died en masse in Prague and needed to be buried quickly. At that time, the cemetery was located outside the city. In 1787, when the plague again struck the city, Emperor Joseph II banned the burial of bodies within Prague city limits and Olšany Cemetery was declared the central graveyard for hygiene purposes. The cemetery was expanded in several stages and new burial fields were established, especially in the 19th and 20th centuries. The original location from 1680 (Cemetery I) ceased to be used in 1860. The Municipal Cemetery I was established in 1900 and the Municipal Cemetery II was established in 1917.

Since 1958, the entire cemetery is protected as a cultural monument. Since 1978, the honorary burial grounds of Allied armies and freedom fighters are protected as a national cultural monument.

=== Honorary burial grounds ===
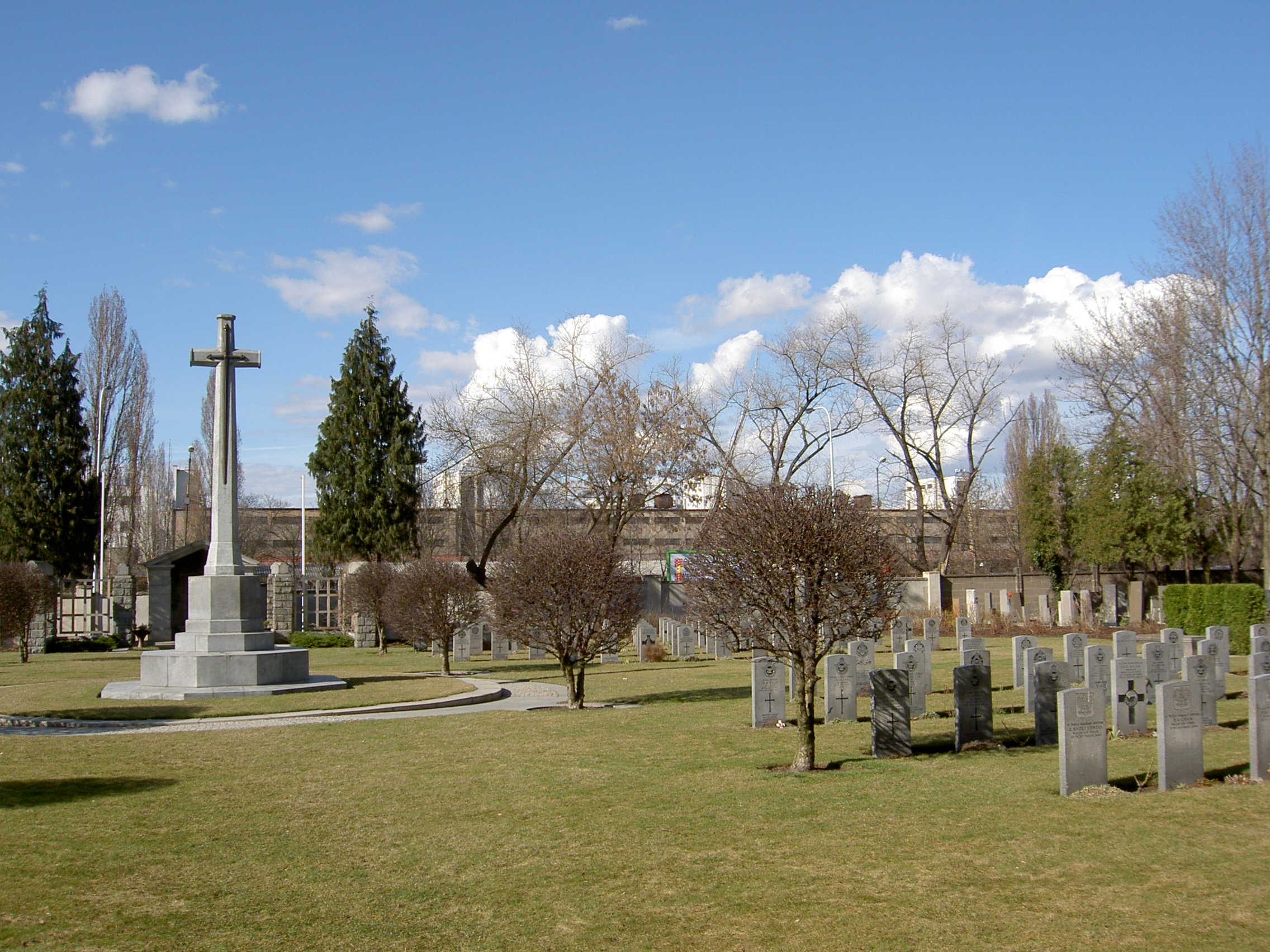
Burial grounds of the soldiers from the countries of the Commonwealth

Among the thousands of military personnel buried at Olšany Cemetery, there are Russian soldiers and officers from the Napoleonic Wars, members of the Czechoslovak Legion, Czechoslovak soldiers, officers and pilots who fought at the Eastern and Western Front and in North Africa during World War II as well as male and female members of the Soviet and Commonwealth (including British, Canadian, South African, Greek and Turkish Cypriot and Polish) armed forces who died for the freedom of Czechoslovakia in 1944–1945, including POWs. Based on a bilateral agreement, Czech authorities are responsible for the protection of Russian and Soviet military graves at the Czech territory (as Russia is responsible for protecting Czechoslovak war graves from both World Wars in Russia). The Commonwealth Prague War Cemetery, including 256 graves, was established under the terms of the 1949 War Graves Agreement between the United Kingdom and Czechoslovakia and is maintained by the Commonwealth War Graves Commission.

== Buildings and monuments ==
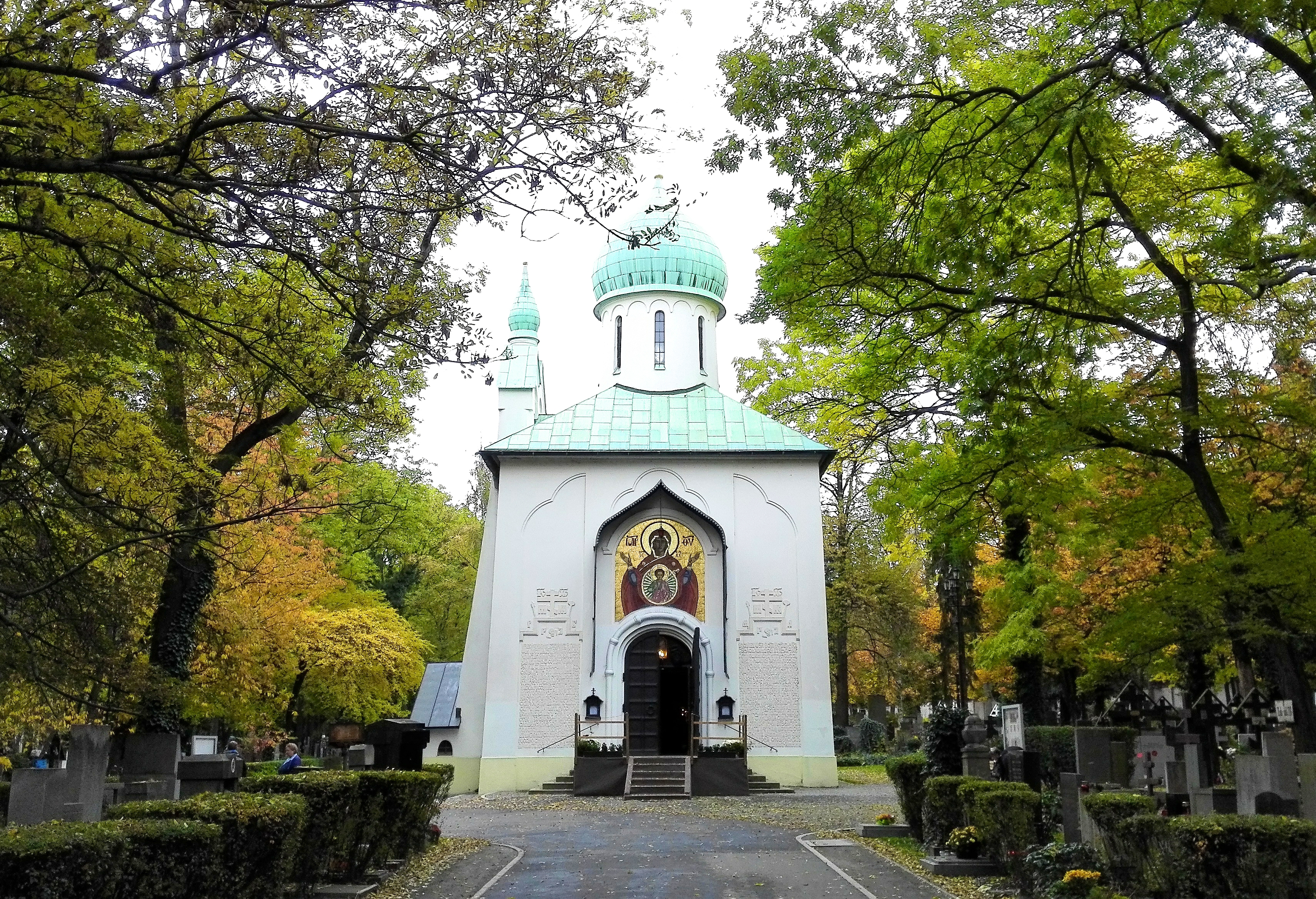
Church of the Dormition

There are two ceremonial halls. The first one, called Old Ceremonial Hall, was built in 1894 on the Cemetery VI part of the Olšany Cemetery. The second one, New Ceremonial Hall on the Municipal Cemetery I, is a neo-Renaissance building from 1921.

Next to the Orthodox section of the cemetery is the Church of the Dormition. It was built in 1924–1925. The painted decoration of the church interior was designed by Ivan Bilibin.

There are many tombstones that are architecturally valuable, and tombs with valuable sculptural decoration. They were decorated by leading Czech artists and represent the development of Czech figurative sculpture from the end of the 18th century to the present day. Among the most significant are those in the Art Nouveau style.

The Olšany Cemeteries Educational Trail leads through the cemetery. It is mapping the history of three of the oldest sections, also sketching the life stories of some celebrities buried here.

== Notable interments ==
Notable people buried at Olšany Cemetery (excluding New Jewish Cemetery) include:

=== Politics and military ===
- Josef Barák (1833–1883), politician, journalist and poet
- Richard Bienert (1881–1949), politician, prime minister of Protectorate of Bohemia and Moravia
- Vladimir Boyarsky (1901–1945), Russian military officer
- Hermann, Freiherr Dahlen von Orlaburg (1828–1887), Austrian administrator
- Josip Filipović (1819–1889), Croatian military leader
- Gusta Fučíková (1903–1987), politician and activist
- Radola Gajda (1892–1948), military leader and politician
- Klement Gottwald (1896–1953), politician, President of Czechoslovakia
- Tamaš Hryb (1895–1938), Belarusian politician, journalist and writer
- Antonín Janoušek (1877–1941), politician and journalist
- Charles Jonas (1840–1896), politician, journalist and linguist
- Karel Klapálek (1893–1984), military leader
- Karel Kramář (1860–1937), politician, Prime Minister of Czechoslovakia
- Pyotra Krecheuski (1879–1928), Belarusian statesman
- Karel Kutlvašr (1895–1961), military leader
- Matija Majar (1809–1892), Slovenian priest and political activist
- Vojtěch Mastný (1874–1954), lawyer and diplomat
- Jaroslava Moserová (1930–2006), politician, diplomat and translator
- Antonín Němec (1858–1926), politician and journalist
- Václav Nosek (1892–1955), politician
- Rudolf Pernický (1915–2005), military leader
- Eliška Purkyňová (1868–1933), politician
- Karel Sladkovský (1823–1880), lawyer, politician and journalist
- Josef Smrkovský (1911–1974), politician
- Antonín Sochor (1914–1950), military leader
- Jan Syrový (1888–1970), military leader and politician, Prime Minister of Czechoslovakia
- Alois Vocásek (1896–2003), soldier
- Pavel Vranský (1921–2018), military leader
- Bohuslav Vrbenský (1882–1944), politician
- Vasil Zacharka (1877–1943), Belarusian politician and activist
- Ladislav Zápotocký (1852–1916), politician and journalist

=== Science and academia ===
- Nicolai Ivanovich Andrusov (1861–1924), Russian geologist and palaeontologist
- Anna Bayerová (1853–1924), physician
- Bernard Bolzano (1781–1848), mathematician
- Ivan Borkovský (1897–1976), archaeologist
- Josef Božek (1782–1835), engineer and inventor
- Bohumil Bydžovský (1880–1969), mathematician
- Ladislav Josef Čelakovský (1834–1902), botanist
- Jindřich Chalupecký (1910–1990), art theorist, literary theorist and art historian
- Pavel Eisner (1889–1958), linguist and translator
- Antonín Frič (1832–1913), paleontologist, biologist and geologist
- Václav Frič (1839–1916), naturalist and natural history dealer
- Anton Gindely (1829–1892), historian
- Jaroslav Goll (1846–1929), historian, writer and educator
- Eduard Gundling (1819–1905), lawyer
- Ignác Jan Hanuš (1812–1869), philosopher and librarian
- Ladislav Haškovec (1866–1944), neuropsychiatrist
- Bohuslav Havránek (1893–1978), philologist and Slavist
- Bohuslav Hostinský (1884–1951), mathematician and physicist
- Otakar Hostinský (1847–1910), historian and musicologist
- Jiří Janda (1865–1938), ornithologist
- Antonín Jan Jungmann (1775–1854), physician and educator
- Josef Jungmann (1773–1847), linguist and poet
- Josef Kalousek (1838–1915), historian
- Napoleon Manuel Kheil (1849–1923), entomologist
- Nikodim Kondakov (1844–1925), Russian art historian
- Karl Kořistka (1825–1906), geographer, cartographer and mathematician
- Julius Vincenz von Krombholz (1782–1843), physician and mycologist
- Bohumil Kučera (1874–1921), physicist
- Ivan Ivanovich Lapshin (1870–1952), Russian philosopher and publicist
- Václav Láska (1862–1943), geodesist, astronomer, geophysicist and mathematician
- Vincenc Lesný (1882–1953), research scholar of Indology and Iranian studies
- František Lexa (1876–1960), Egyptologist
- Anna Masaryková (1911–1996), art historian
- Zdeněk Matějka (1937–2006), chemist
- Karel Maydl (1853–1903), surgeon
- František Antonín Nickerl (1813–1871), entomologist
- Lubor Niederle (1865–1944), archeologist and anthropologist
- Pavel Novgorodtsev (1866–1924), Russian lawyer and philosopher
- Bedřich Procházka (1855–1934), mathematician
- Josef Reinsberg (1844–1930), physician
- Antonín Rezek (1853–1909), historian
- František Vilém Rosický (1847–1909), botanist and zoologist
- Karel Rychlík (1885–1968), mathematician
- Pavel Jozef Šafárik (1795–1861), Slovak philologist and historian
- Vojtěch Šafařík (1829–1902), chemist
- August Seydler (1849–1891), astronomer and physicist
- Jiřina Šiklová (1935–2021), sociologist
- Vladislav Šír (1830–1889), ornithologist
- František Smotlacha (1884–1956), mycologist
- Miroslav Smotlacha (1920–2007), mycologist
- František Josef Studnička (1836–1903), mathematician and meteorologist
- Viktor Trkal (1888–1956), physicist
- Renáta Tyršová (1854–1937), ethnographer and art historian
- Jan Erazim Vocel (1803–1871), archaeologist, historian and poet
- Stanislav Vydra (1741–1804), mathematician and writer
- Eduard Weyr (1852–1903), mathematician
- Václav Zenger (1830–1908), physicist and meteorologist

=== Sports ===
- Babeta Dražková (1905–1988), swimmer
- Jan Fleischmann (1885–1939), ice hockey player
- Miloslav Fleischmann (1886–1955), ice hockey player
- Jindřich Fügner (1822–1865), sports administrator
- Vilém Goppold von Lobsdorf (1869–1943), fencer
- Jiří Stanislav Guth-Jarkovský (1861–1943), sports administrator
- Ivan Hlinka (1950–2004), ice hockey player and coach
- Johnny Madden (1865–1948), Scottish football player and manager
- František Plánička (1904–1996), footballer
- Jaroslav Řezáč (1886–1974), ice hockey player
- Pavel Roman (1943–1972), figure skater
- Věra Suková (1931–1982), tennis player
- Miroslav Tyrš (1832–1884), philosopher and sports organiser

=== Arts ===
==== Language arts ====
- Milada Blekastad (1917–2003), literary historian and translator
- Alois Bohdan Brixius (1903–1959), traveller, orientalist and travel writer
- František Čelakovský (1799–1852), writer and translator
- Evgeny Chirikov (1864–1932), Russian writer and playwright
- Viktor Dyk (1877–1931), poet, writer and politician
- Karel Jaromír Erben (1811–1870), writer and poet
- Ladislav Fuks (1923–1994), writer
- Bohumila Grögerová (1921–2014), poet and translator
- Zdenka Hásková (1878–1946), journalist and writer
- Jiří Haussmann (1898–1923), writer
- Karel Havlíček Borovský (1821–1856), writer and journalist
- Adolf Hoffmeister (1902–1973), writer and publicist
- Vladimír Holan (1905–1980), poet
- Josefa Humpalová–Zeman (1870–1906), journalist, newspaper founder and feminist
- Michael Kácha (1874–1940), anarchist, journalist and publisher
- Ján Kollár (1793–1852), Slovak poet and writer
- Václav Matěj Kramerius (1753–1808), publisher, journalist and writer
- Eliška Krásnohorská (1847–1926), writer and feminist
- Anna Lauermannová-Mikšová (1852–1932), writer
- Marie Majerová (1882–1967), writer and translator
- Jakub Malý (1811–1885), historian, writer and journalist
- Vilém Mathesius (1882–1945), linguist and literary historian
- Rudolf Medek (1890–1940), poet and military leader
- Vasily Nemirovich-Danchenko (1845–1936), Russian writer
- Stanislav Kostka Neumann (1875–1947), poet and translator
- Teréza Nováková (1853–1912), writer, feminist and ethnographer
- Sofie Podlipská (1833–1897), writer
- Anna Řeháková (1850–1937), teacher, translator and writer
- Eliška Řeháková (1846–1916), teacher, translator and journalist
- Jan Rejsa (1886–1971), poet, writer and editor
- Karel Sabina (1813–1877), writer and journalist
- Hugo Salus (1866–1929), writer, poet and physician
- Franta Sauer (1882–1947), writer
- Karel Schulz (1899–1943), writer and poet
- Pavel Šrut (1940–2018), poet and writer
- Karolina Světlá (1830–1899), writer

==== Performing arts ====
- Arkady Averchenko (1881–1925), Russian playwright and satirist
- Karel Bendl (1838–1897), composer
- Svatopluk Beneš (1918–2007), actor
- Vilém Blodek (1834–1874), composer, flautist and pianist
- Pavel Bobek (1937−2013), singer
- Helena Bušová (1914–1986), actress
- Adolf Čech (1841–1903), conductor
- Emma Černá (1937–2018), actress
- Karel Černoch (1943–2007), singer, guitarist and comedian
- Judita Čeřovská (1929–2001), singer
- Vladimír Dlouhý (1958–2010), actor
- Adolf Dobrovolný (1864–1934), actor and radio announcer
- Karel Dostal (1884–1966), actor
- Alexander Dreyschock (1818–1869), pianist and composer
- Kateřina Emingerová (1856–1934), composer and pianist
- Ladislav Fialka (1931–1991), mime
- František Filip (1930–2021), film and television director
- František Filipovský (1907–1993), actor and voice actor
- Stanislav Fišer (1931–2022), actor and voice actor
- Josef Bohuslav Foerster (1859–1951), composer and musicologist
- Václav Kliment Klicpera (1792–1859), playwright and poet
- Jiří Herold (1875–1934), violist, violinist and music teacher
- Radim Hladík (1946–2016), guitarist and composer
- Václav Emanuel Horák (1800–1871), composer and liturgical musician
- Rudolf Hrušínský (1920–1994), actor
- Karel Hruška (1891–1966), opera singer and actor
- Aťka Janoušková (1930–2019), actress, voice actress and singer
- Jaroslav Ježek (1906–1942) composer, pianist and conductor
- Dušan Klein (1939–2022), film director and screenwriter
- Jiří Kodet (1937–2005), actor
- Josef Jiří Kolár (1812–1896), actor, translator and writer
- Zdeněk Košler (1928–1995), conductor
- Karel Kovařovic (1862–1920), composer and conductor
- Jan Kříženecký (1868–1921), cinema pioneer and film director
- Lubomír Lipský (1923–2015), actor
- Václav Lohniský (1920–1980), actor
- Radovan Lukavský (1919–2008), actor
- Růžena Maturová (1869–1938), opera singer
- Jan Nepomuk Maýr (1818–1888), opera singer and director, conductor and composer
- Vladimír Menšík (1929–1988), actor and comedian
- Alois Neruda (1837–1899), cellist
- Oldřich Nový (1899–1983), actor
- Miroslav Ondříček (1934–2015), cinematographer
- Jindřich Plachta (1899–1951), actor and comedian
- Bronislav Poloczek (1939–2012), actor
- Jan Ludevít Procházka (1837–1888), pianist and composer
- Antonín Pulda (1848–1894), actor and theatre director
- Saša Rašilov (1891–1955), actor
- Lella Ricci (1850–1871), Italian opera singer
- Luigi Ricci (1805–1859), Italian composer
- Boris Rösner (1951–2006), actor
- Josef Rovenský (1894–1937), actor and film director
- Josef Richard Rozkošný (1833–1913), composer and pianist
- Jiří Schelinger (1951–1981), singer and guitarist
- Jiří Slavíček (1901–1957), film editor and director
- Ladislav Smoljak (1931–2010), film and theatre director, actor and screenwriter
- Helena Štáchová (1944–2017), puppeteer, voice actress and playwright
- Ladislav Štaidl (1945–2021), songwriter and musician
- Jan Stallich (1907–1973), cinematographer
- Jiřina Steimarová (1916–2007), actress
- Jan Nepomuk Štěpánek (1783–1844), playwright, director and actor
- Ladislav Stroupežnický (1850–1892), playwright and writer
- František Adolf Šubert (1849–1915), theatre director and playwright
- Josef Šváb-Malostranský (1860–1932), actor, writer, film director and screenwriter
- Franz Thomé (1807–1872), Austrian theatre director and actor
- Filip Topol (1965–2013), singer, songwriter and pianist
- Hana Vítová (1914–1987), actress
- Eduard Vojan (1853–1920), actor
- Jaroslav Vojta (1888–1970), actor
- Václav Voska (1918–1982), actor
- George Voskovec (1905–1981), actor and playwright
- Jan Vyčítal (1942–2020), singer and songwriter
- Josef Wenzig (1807–1876), playwright and librettist
- Jan Werich (1905–1980), actor
- Hanuš Wihan (1855–1920), cellist
- Miroslav Žbirka (1952–2021), Slovak singer and songwriter

==== Visual arts ====
- Vojtěch Bartoněk (1859–1908), painter and art restorer
- Antonín Viktor Barvitius (1823–1901), architect
- Viktor Barvitius (1834–1902), painter
- Jaroslav Benda (1882–1970), painter and illustrator
- Joseph Bergler (1753–1829), Austrian painter and etcher
- Adolf Born (1930–2016), painter, cartoonist and illustrator
- Vladimír Boudník (1924–1968), graphic artist and photographer
- Jan Adolf Brandeis (1818–1872), painter and photographer
- Pavel Brázda (1926–2017), painter and graphic artist
- Vratislav Hugo Brunner (1886–1928), illustrator, painter, typographer and designer
- Alois Bubák (1824–1870), painter and illustrator
- Jaroslav Čermák (1831–1878), painter
- Jindřich Eckert (1833–1905), photographer
- Helena Emingerová (1858–1943), painter
- Josef Fanta (1856–1954), architect and designer
- Emanuel Salomon Friedberg-Mírohorský (1829–1908), painter and illustrator
- Joseph von Führich (1800–1876), Austrian painter
- Bedřich Havránek (1821–1899), painter and illustrator
- Eduard Herold (1820–1895), painter and illustrator
- František Horčička (1776–1856), painter
- Jakub Husník (1837–1916), painter, art teacher and inventor
- Václav Jansa (1859–1913), painter and illustrator
- Karel Javůrek (1815–1909), painter
- Miloš Jiránek (1875–1911), painter, art critic and writer
- Jan Konůpek (1883–1950), illustrator and painter
- Vlastimil Košvanec (1887–1961), painter, graphic designer and illustrator
- Jan Jakub Kotík (1972–2007), visual artist and drummer
- Josef Kranner (1801–1871), architect
- Josef Lada (1887–1957), painter, illustrator and writer
- Hermína Laukotová (1853–1931), painter
- Otakar Lebeda (1877–1901), painter
- Karel Liebscher (1851–1906), painter and illustrator
- Emanuel Krescenc Liška (1852–1903), painter and illustrator
- Antonín Machek (1775–1844), painter
- Josef Mánes (1820–1871), painter
- Quido Mánes (1828–1880), painter
- Amalie Mánesová (1817–1883), painter
- Josef Mařatka (1874–1937), sculptor
- Luděk Marold (1865–1898), painter and illustrator
- Herbert Masaryk (1880–1915), painter
- Josef Mauder (1854–1920), sculptor and painter
- Emanuel Max (1810–1901), sculptor
- Josef Max (1804–1855), sculptor
- Mikuláš Medek (1926–1974), painter
- Jiří Načeradský (1939–2014), painter and graphic artist
- Josef Matěj Navrátil (1798–1865), painter
- Pavel Nešleha (1937–2003), painter
- Josef Niklas (1817–1877), architect and builder
- Viktor Oliva (1861–1928), painter and illustrator
- August Piepenhagen (1791–1868), painter
- Charlotte Piepenhagen (1821–1902), painter
- Louisa Piepenhagen (1825–1893), painter
- Osvald Polívka (1859–1931), architect
- Karel Postl (1769–1818), painter
- Artuš Scheiner (1863–1938), painter and illustrator
- Bohuslav Schnirch (1845–1901), sculptor and designer
- Tomáš Seidan (1830–1890), sculptor and art teacher
- Bořek Šípek (1949–2016), architect and designer
- Antonín Slavíček (1870–1910), painter
- Jan Slavíček (1900–1970), painter
- Libuše Stratilová (1933–2001), painter and printmaker
- Karel Svoboda (1824–1870), painter
- František Tkadlík (1786–1840), painter
- Alois Wachsman (1898–1942), painter and stage designer
- Bedřich Wachsmann (1820–1897), painter and architect
- Karl Würbs (1807–1876), painter and lithographer
- Růžena Zátková (1885–1923), painter and sculptor
- František Ženíšek (1849–1916), painter

=== Other ===
- Julie Fantová-Kusá (1858–1908), social worker, suffragette and feminist
- Antonín Kalina (1902–1990), war hero
- Adalbert Lanna the Elder (1805–1866), shipmaster, merchant and industrialist
- Květoslav Minařík (1908–1974), yogi and mystic
- Anna Náprstková (1788–1873), businesswoman and philanthropist
- Jan Palach (1948–1969), student and political activist
- Moses Porges von Portheim (1781–1870), industrialist
- Anna Ptáčková (1856–1906), suffragette, feminist and teacher

== In popular culture ==
Some scenes from the 2002 movie Bad Company and the 2008 TV series Kriminálka Anděl were filmed at Olšany Cemetery.
