= Piepenhagen =

Piepenhagen is a surname. Notable people with the surname include:

- August Piepenhagen (1791–1868), German painter
- Charlotte Piepenhagen (1821–1902), Czech painter and lithographer
- Louisa Piepenhagen (1825–1893), Czech painter
