= Vojtěch Náprstek =

Czech and American politician and journalist (1826–1894)

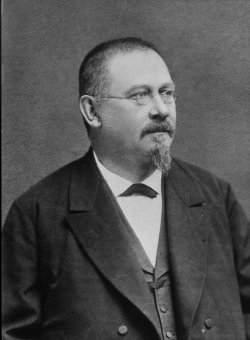
Vojtěch Náprstek

Vojtěch Náprstek (often called Vojta), born as Adalbert Fingerhut (17 April 1826, in Prague – 2 September 1894), was a philanthropist from Bohemia. He was a Czech patriot and politician, as well as a pioneering Czech language journalist in the United States.

== Background ==
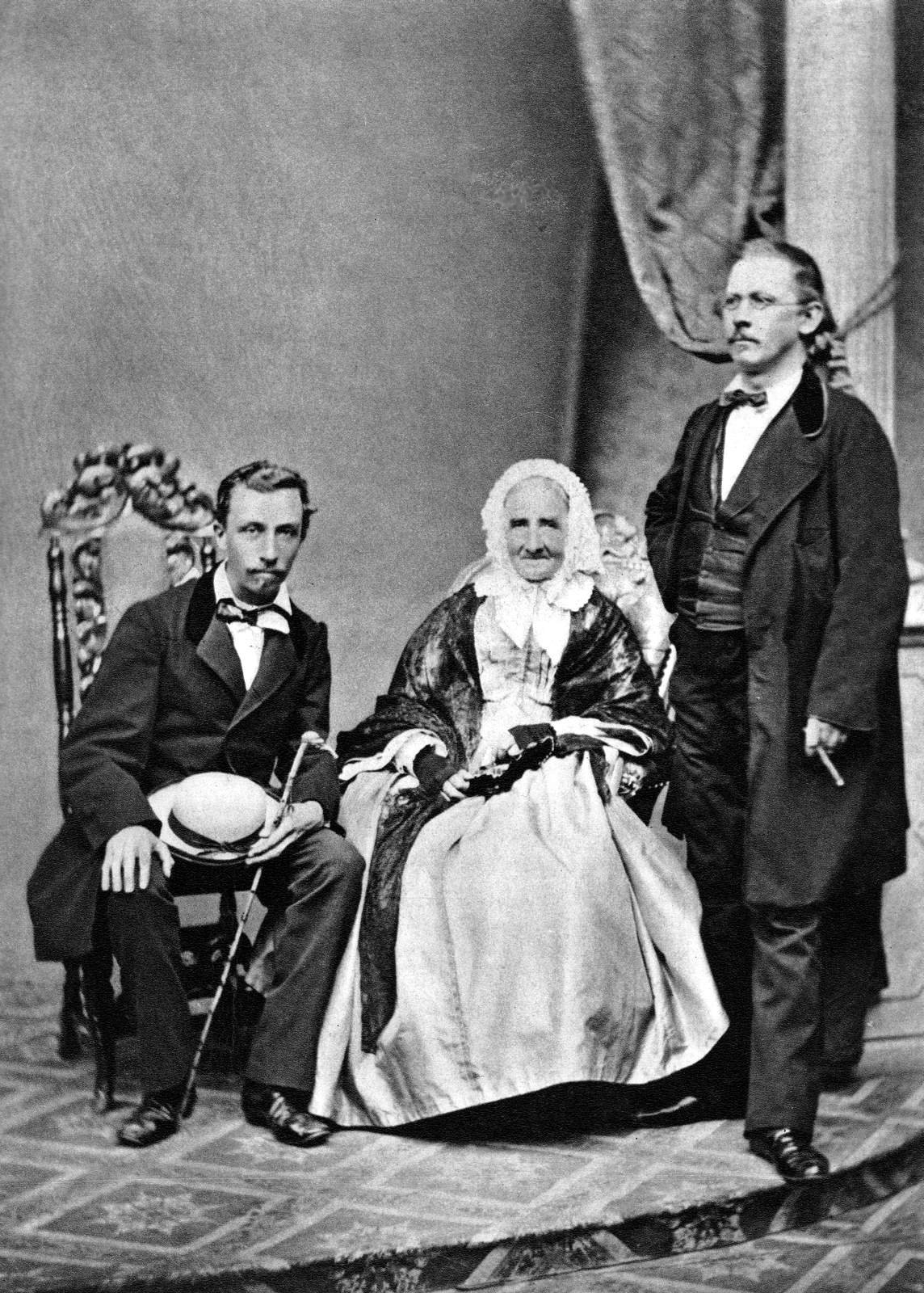
Náprstek (standing) with his mother Anna and brother Ferdinand

Vojtěch Náprstek was born Adalbert Fingerhut. His father, Anton Fingerhut, had the German name as the only one of seven siblings – the others were called by the Czech version of the name Náprstek. (The German word fingerhut and the Czech word naprstek can be translated as thimble in English.) Adalbert officially changed his name to Vojtěch Náprstek in 1880, but he had been using the Czech name far earlier. His mother, Anna Fingerhut-Náprstková (1788–1873), was a nationalist businesswoman who ran a brewery/distillery and adjoining inn, "U Halánků", hospitable to budding nationalist organizations. That building still stands and is located on Bethlehem Square (Betlémské náměstí) in Prague and it is known as the Náprstek Museum of Asian, African and American Cultures. Both Vojtěch and his elder brother Ferdinand, outspoken nationalists, were closely watched by the Habsburg police. After the disastrous results of the Prague Upheavals of 1848, Vojtěch left home in secret for the United States, where he finished his law studies.

== 1848 and America ==
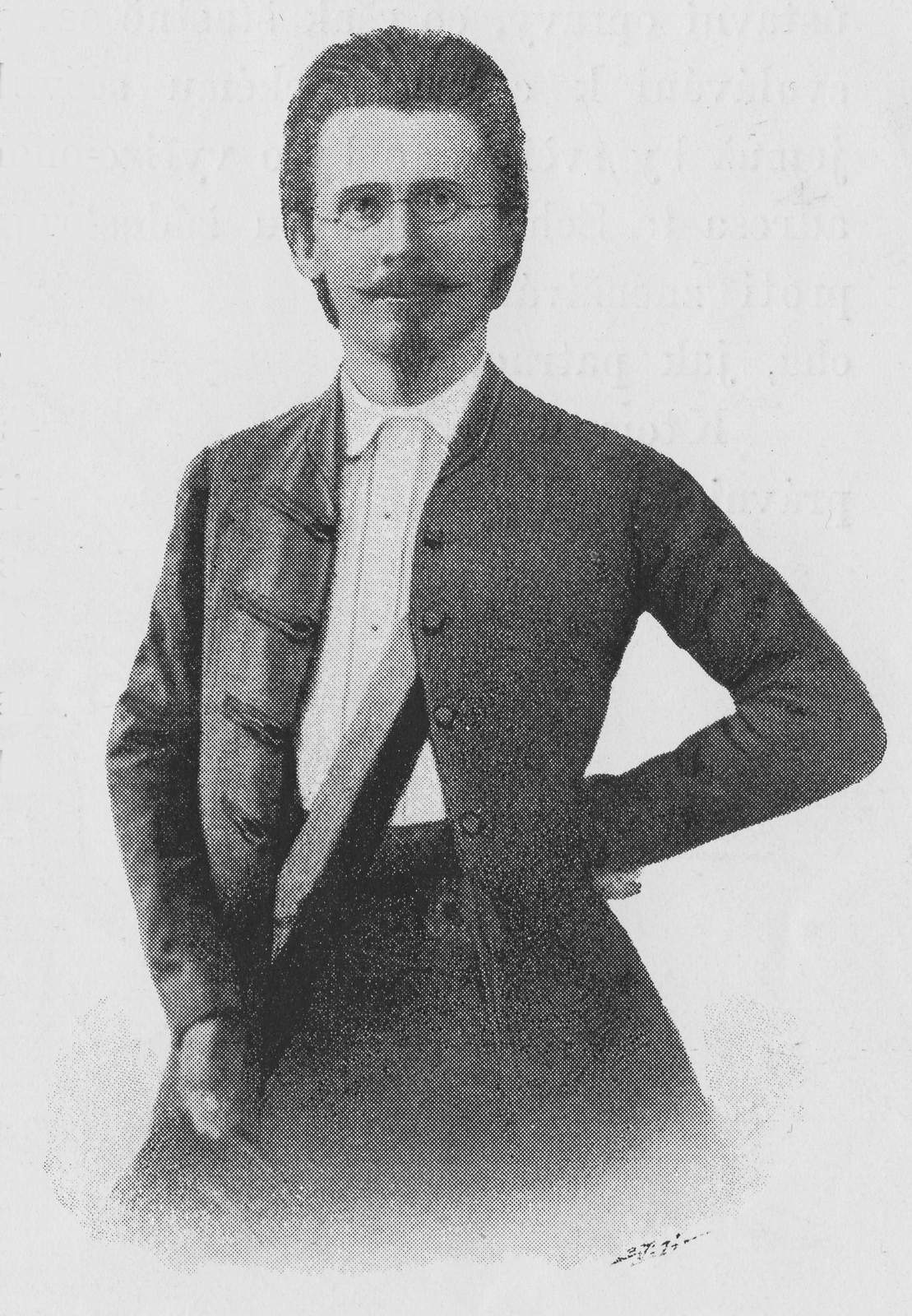
Náprstek in 1848

He secretly fled to Milwaukee in Wisconsin, where he lived for about a decade before returning home, completing his law studies. He is considered to be the spiritual father of Czech journalism in America. He published the freethinking newspaper the Milwaukee Flügblatter, the first periodical published by a Czech in the United States. Although the Flügblatter was in the German language, it was read largely by Czechs. Náprstek encouraged Czech Americans to organise and publish their own Czech newspapers. He became an American citizen.

== Return to Bohemia ==
He returned to Bohemia around 1857, and resumed political activities. After his return, he labored to familiarize his fellow Czechs with American concepts, institutions, and techniques, as well as with the Native American peoples with whom he had worked. He helped fellow Czech patriot Charles Jonas learn English, arranged for his flight to London, and later arranged for his immigration to Racine, Wisconsin. His collections became the core of the present Náprstek Museum of Asian, African, and American cultures in Prague. He became an alderman of the town of Prague (1873–1894) and a town councillor (1881–1892). Náprstek was an advocate of progressive ideas, including general living conditions in Prague, as well as the provision of education and health care facilities and the introduction of modern technologies in public life (gas lighting and cooking, the telephone, etc.). He also co-founded, in 1888, the Czech Hiking Club (Klub českých turistů). He was initiated into freemasonry during his life in the United States. After his return to the Austrian Empire he founded small illegal masonic groups for propagation of masonic ideals.

=== Women's rights ===
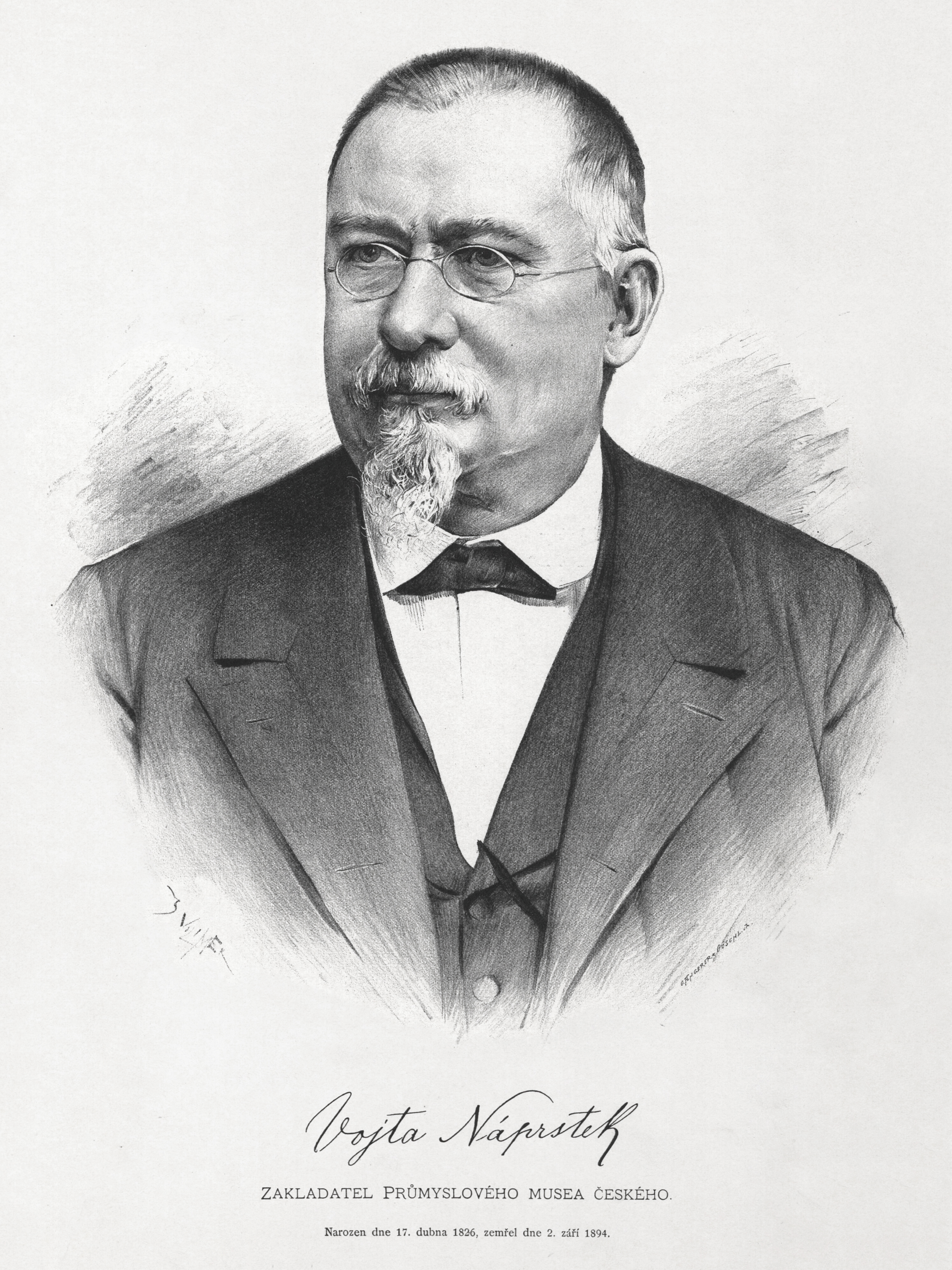
Náprstek in 1885; portrait by Jan Vilímek

When he returned to Prague after ten years abroad, his speeches and presentations about activities established by American women attracted a great deal of attention. Around 1864 he organised an exhibition of American sewing machines (until then unknown in Prague) together with demonstrations on how to use them, which was heavily visited by women. In 1865 he founded the "Americký klub dám" (American Ladies' Club or American Club of Bohemian Women), which held its first meetings on the premises of his mother's inn "U Halánků". The club offered lectures on questions of women's emancipation, astronomy, medicine, biology, philosophy, literature, history and many other topics. The free lectures were given to women on Sunday mornings; men were allowed to listen to them from the lobby. During the twenty years of this lecture series, almost 27,000 listeners were registered. The members of the American Ladies' Club could also use Náprstek's library of Czech books, as well as books written in English and other foreign languages. This patronage, as well as his public advocacy of women's suffrage as early as 1887, brought Náprstek the sobriquet "the women's advocate". The organisation was looked upon askance by the authorities, and was forced to function as a private club rather than as a civic organisation.

== Bibliography ==
- Czech Pioneers in Wisconsin by Miloslav Rechcigl Jr., accessed 9 December 2007.
