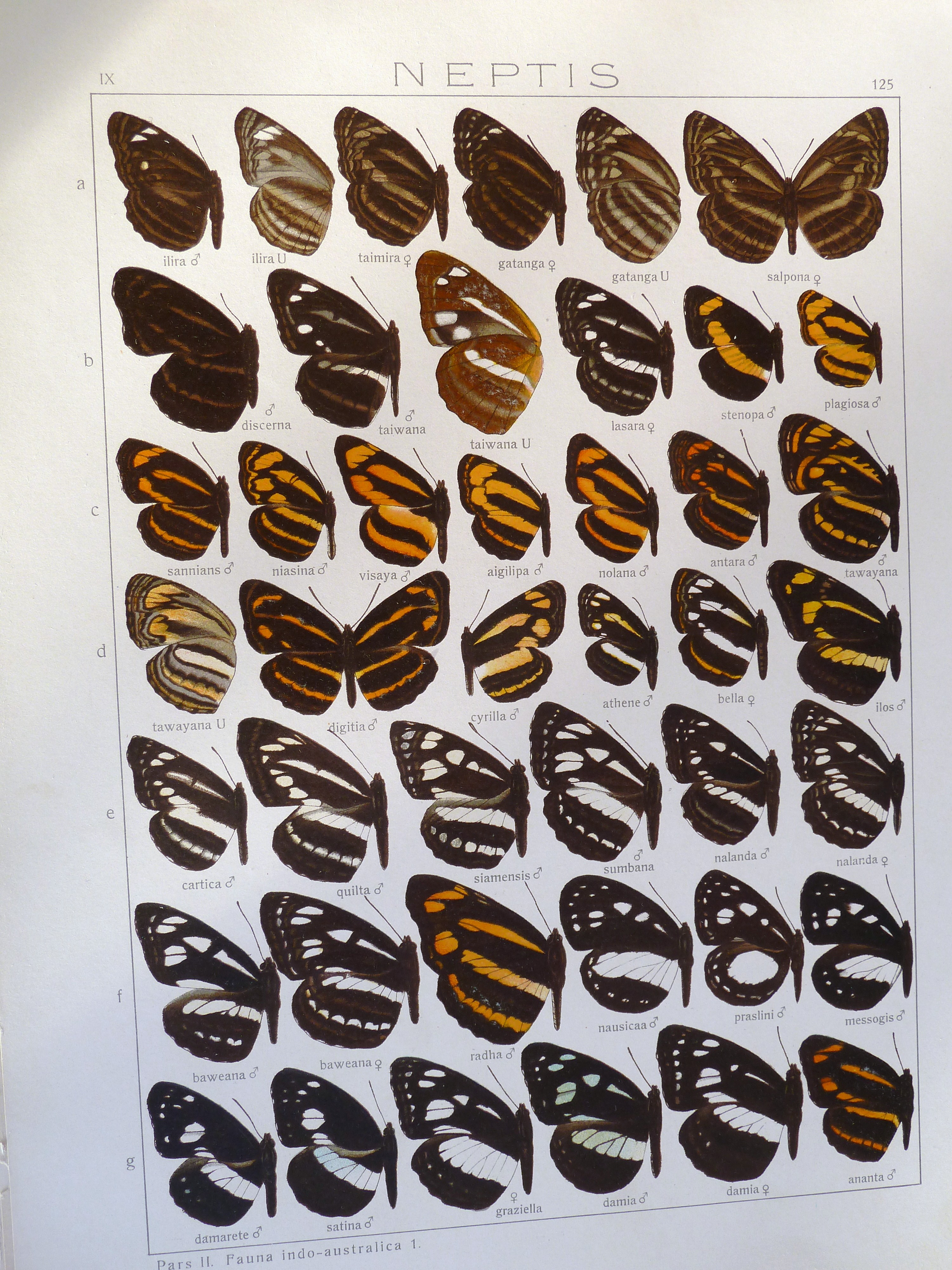
- Neptis ilira in Seitz (a)

Scientific classification
- Kingdom: Animalia
- Phylum: Arthropoda
- Class: Insecta
- Order: Lepidoptera
- Family: Nymphalidae
- Genus: Neptis
- Species: N. ilira

Binomial name
- Neptis ilira Kheil, 1884

= Neptis ilira =

Species of butterfly

Neptis ilira is an Indomalayan butterfly of the family Nymphalidae first described by Napoleon Manuel Kheil in 1884.

== Subspecies ==
- N. i. ilira Nias pure white subapical spots on forewing; under surface darker, hindwing with violet subbasal band, forewing with similar streak in cell
- N. i. palawanica Staudinger, 1889 Philippines (Palawan) f with larger, wedge-shaped, white subapical spots, 3 median spots on forewings and a white median band on hindwing, widening out costally, strongly tapering basally
- N. i. cindia Eliot, 1969 northeast India to Peninsular Malaya, Sumatra, Borneo, Pulau Tioman
- N. i. ria Eliot, 1969Java
