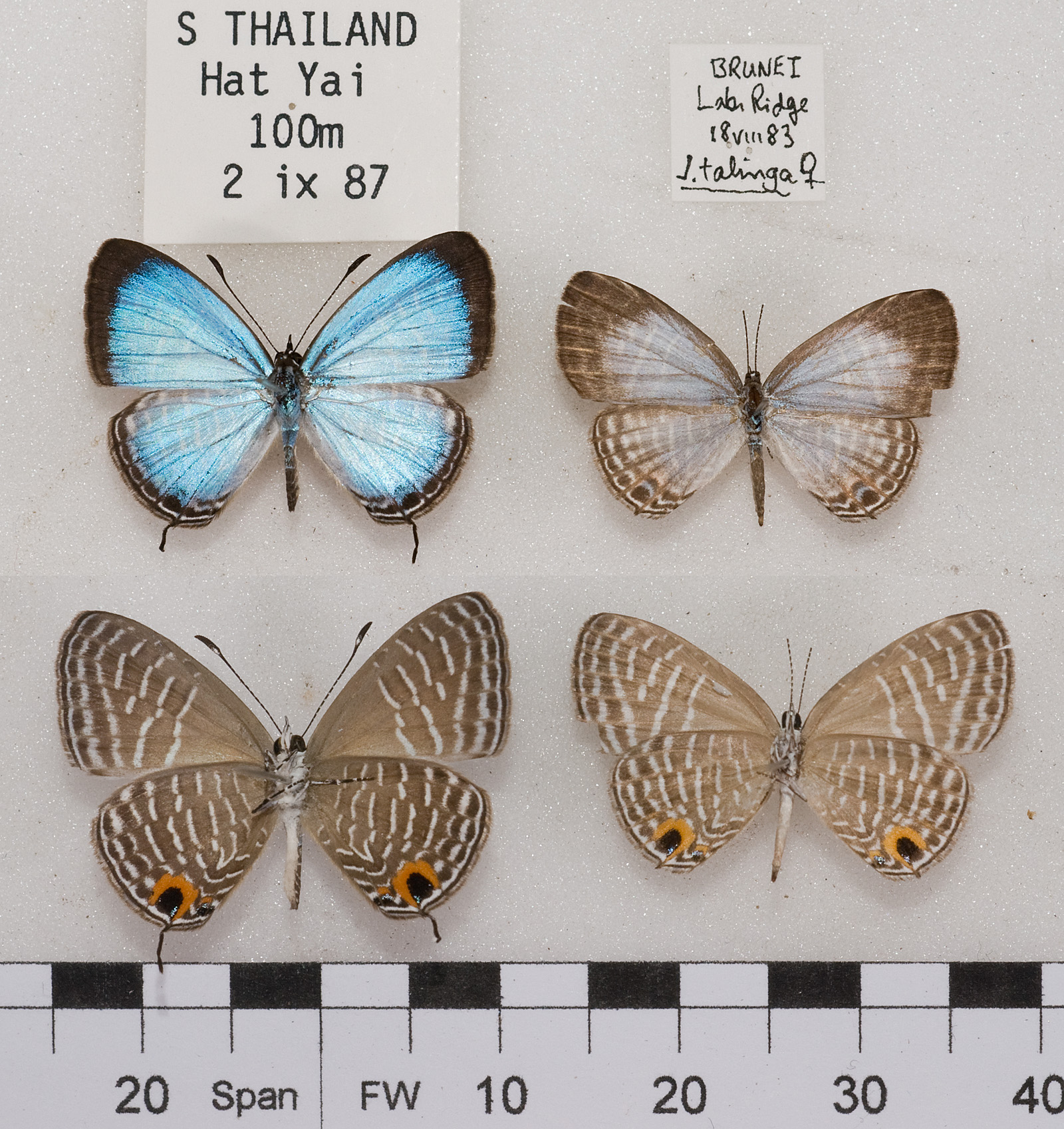

Scientific classification
- Domain: Eukaryota
- Kingdom: Animalia
- Phylum: Arthropoda
- Class: Insecta
- Order: Lepidoptera
- Family: Lycaenidae
- Genus: Jamides
- Species: J. talinga

Binomial name
- Jamides talinga (Kheil, 1884)

Synonyms
- Plebeius talinga Kheil, 1884

= Jamides talinga =

Species of butterfly

Jamides talinga is a butterfly in the family Lycaenidae. It was described by Napoleon Manuel Kheil in 1884. It is found in the Indomalayan realm where it has been recorded from Nias, Sumatra, Borneo and Peninsular Malaysia.
