= Jan Rejsa =

Jan Rejsa (16 September 1886 – 9 December 1971) was a Czech poet, writer, editor and literary columnist.

== Life ==
Rejsa was born in Prague, Bohemia, Austria-Hungary on 16 September 1886. He was born into a police council family, which he believed was descended from a noble Lusatian family that later colonized Silesia. This ancestry led him to write under the pseudonyms Jan Rejsa Kolkovský and Jan Rejsa of Kolkovic, from a character presented to his ancestors by Emperor Rudolf II in 1579.

He graduated from the Academic Gymnasium in Prague, where he taught history. After graduating in 1906 he worked as a clerk for various societies. From 1916 he studied at Charles University in Prague, reading Czech history, literature, art history, archeology and the culture of ancient France. He graduated in 1922, defending the work of early Christian paintings in the Roman catacombs. Also undertook a study tour to Germany, Austria and Italy. He was also interested in genealogy and heraldry.

Rejsa died in Prague on 9 December 1971, aged 85. He is buried at Olšany Cemetery in Prague.

== Work ==
Contributed to various magazines (Apollon, Ark, Goal Life Czech Word, Work, People's Leaves, Literary Circle, the National Newspaper). His first poems (published in 1927) were inspired by ancient and Renaissance motifs in the academic eclectic style. Later he moved to the Neo (i.e. decadent).

Edited Proceedings of the Unity Descendants of White Mountain Exiles in Prague in the years 1931–1938.

Published poet and science fiction author.

== Writings ==
- Čtyři renaissanční sonety, Prague at own expense, 1927, bibliophile
- Na březích Ilissu, Prague: Miloš Procházka, 1928 - Poems
- Obraz sv. Dorothey, Prague: [Ser], 1930
- Hudba země, Prague: A. Praise 1933 - Poems
- Duše v plamenech, Moravian Ostrava: [sn], 1935 - Poems
- Efeméry : imaginární novely, Prague: Mor. Ostrava: Library Literary Circle in Ostrava-Vítkovice 1937
- Neznámý elixír : hradčanské romaneto, Litomysl: John R. Veselík 1940
- Hvězda na východě : básně městu Litomyšli, Litomysl: John R. Veselík 1940
- Most vidin, Prague: O. Pied 1944

=== Translations ===
- Paul Gauguin: Noa Noa, KDA, Volume 52, Prague: Kamilla Neumann, 1919
