= Miloslav Fleischmann =

Czech ice hockey player

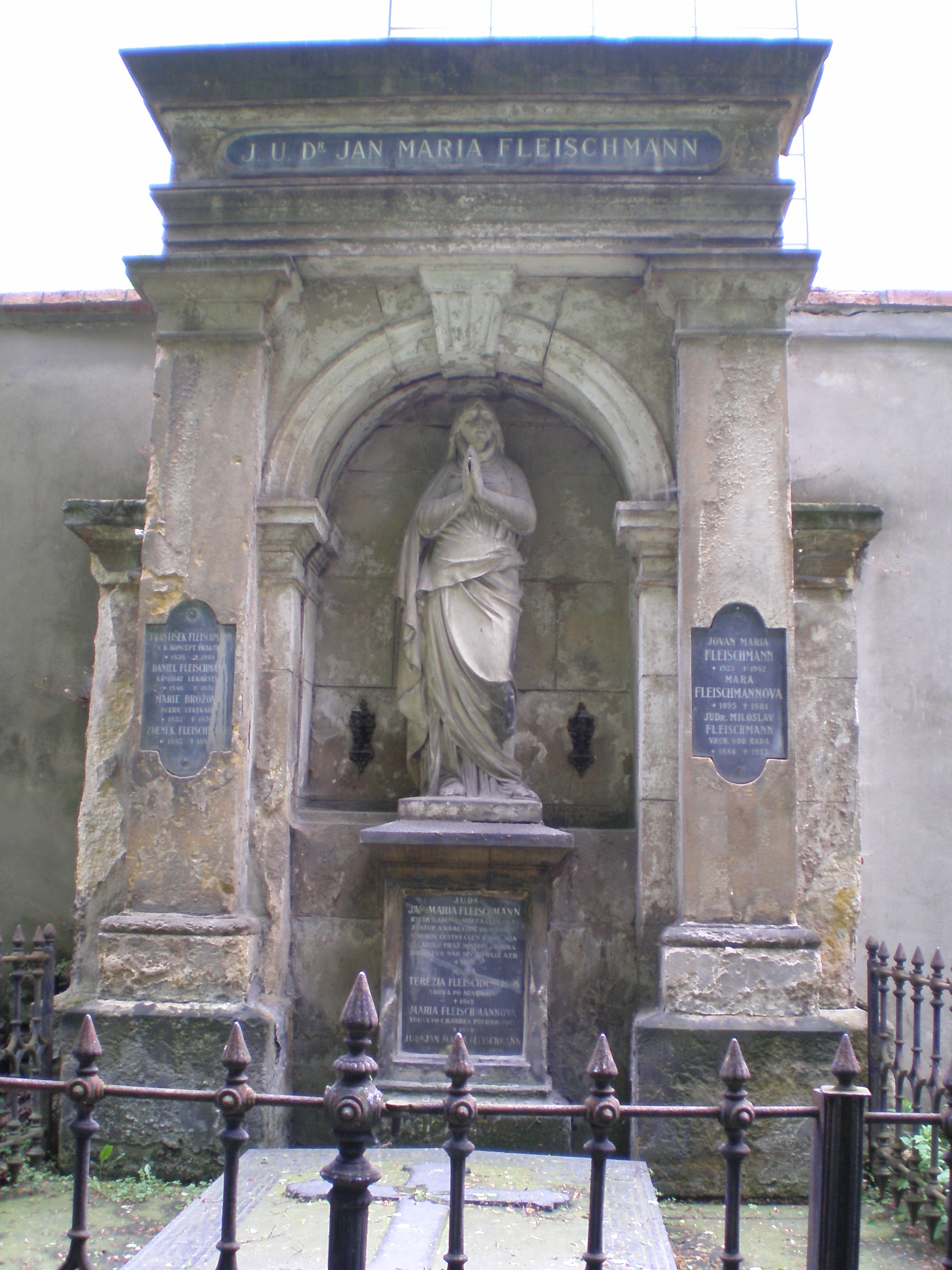
- Fleischmann family grave at the Olšany Cemetery in Prague
- Born: 4 September 1886 Smíchov, Bohemia, Austria-Hungary
- Died: 12 August 1955 (aged 68) Prague, Czechoslovakia
- Position: Right wing
- Played for: HC Slavia Praha
- National team: Czechoslovakia
- Playing career: 1910–1925

Miloslav František Michael Fleischmann (4 September 1886 – 12 August 1955) was a Czech ice hockey player who competed for Czechoslovakia in the 1924 Winter Olympics.

In 1924 he participated with the Czechoslovak team in the first Winter Olympics ice hockey tournament. His elder brother Jan was also a member of the squad.
