= Vlastimil Košvanec =

Czech artist

Vlastimil Emil Košvanec (14 December 1887 – November 1961) was a Czech painter, graphic designer and illustrator.

== Biography ==
=== Education and life ===
Vlastimil Košvanec, son of Bedřich Košvanec, a glover, and Helena Košvancová, a dressmaker, was born in Karlín on 14 December 1887. He was baptized under the name of Emil Vlastimil in the Roman Catholic church on 27 December of the same year. The family also included brothers Jaromír, Blažen and Bedřich.

After elementary school he attended the Imperial Royal Lyceum and graduated. After high school he enrolled at the Academy of Fine Arts at the Professor Vlaho Bukovac's school. He studied with Professor Vojtech Hynais, experimenting with techniques of drawing and painting. At the Academy, Košvanec received awards as the best student of the year several times.

As an artist, he engaged with various modernist styles: Realism, Impressionism, Post-Impressionism and Symbolism. During this time he lived in Prague Holešovice district, in Nad Štolou, near the Academy. He gained fame in the 1920s Košvanec and married the painter Františka Matouškova, who later painted under the pseudonym Sidonie Matoušková-Košvancová. After academic studies, he traveled abroad until 1939 in Italy, France, Austria, Germany, Netherlands, Albania, Yugoslavia and Montenegro.

=== Work as illustrator ===
The Czechoslovak Republic was born on 28 October 1918, after the end of the First World War. The political situation was divided between the Communist Party and the Nationalists. Košvanec began his collaboration with the magazines Kopřivy (a satirical publication printed by the Social Democratic Party from 1909 until 1931) and Sršatec (a satirical magazine published by the Communist Party during the Twenties). He probably used at least three pseudonyms to remain anonymous and to protect his safety: V. Havrda, V. Patrik and Karambol.

In 1920 he illustrated the book Tři muži se žralokem a jiné poučné historky (Three men with the shark and Other Stories) written by Jaroslav Hašek, writer and activist of the Anarchist Party, and author of the famous novel Osudy dobrého vojáka Švejka (The Good Soldier Švejk). A year later, Košvanec's illustrations, along with those by Vaclav Spála and Karel Teige appeared in the booklet Sovetsk Rusi.

In 1923 the artist was commissioned to illustrate two of four volumes of the Czech version of Les Misérables by Victor Hugo. This is considered one of his masterworks. In the same year Košvanec illustrated the book The Fascists by B. G. Sandomirsky, which included a portrait of Benito Mussolini. During the 1920s Košvanec increased its prestige, and in the meantime he married the painter Františka Matouškova, who later painted under the pseudonym Sidonie Matoušková-Košvancová.

The artist, while cooperating with satirical magazines, worked for the left-wing newspaper Právo Lidu, later called Rudé Právo. The caricatures, which accompanied the articles of Antonin Macek, were republished in 1958 in a book titled Kukátka (Binoculars). The Czechoslovak Republic, was a bilingual country until 1945, and the German paper Prager Presse was published there from 1921 to 1938: on its pages Košvanec issued his satirical cartoons. The cover of the book of Ivan Suk Little girls under the lantern (Holčičky pod lucernou, 1926) was illustrated with an impressive drawing, that expresses the light and the shade of the human and social complexity of the prostitutes' world.

Košvanec was an active member of the left-wing group called Umělecká beseda (founded in 1863) in 1929. It was an intellectual elite which included figurative artists, musicians, philosophers and writers. The group was particularly animated, and it organized events and exhibitions of artists not only in Prague. It promoted international initiatives dedicated to artists like Carlo Carrà (1929), Giorgio de Chirico (1931) and even the École de Paris event of the same year. During this period Košvanec exhibited not only in galleries in Prague, but in whole Czechoslovakia.

=== Portraiture ===
Košvanec was considered one of the finest portraitist, appreciated both for his technique and his unique style. He imposed a taste and generated a style, to which the Prague upper classes aspired. The rich bourgeois, the aristocracy, the elite, the businessmen, the intellectual and the illustrious men wanted a portrait to be immortalized. This privileged relation enabled the artist to paint portraits of the most important characters of the First Republic such as the President Edvard Beneš, democratic statesman and politician during the transition period between the end of Habsburg Empire (1918) and the Communist takeover of February 1948.

Košvanec studio was located in Prague 12. In addition to portraits of celebrities, in these years the artist tried out figurative compositions set in bucolic, allegorical, mythical settings, putting emphasis on color, light and joie de vivre. Nature became one thing with female figures, and mythologized women were identified with nymphs or represented as a goddess. After many exhibitions from 1926 to 1937, a highly successful personal exhibition was held in Prague in November 1939. Mr. Oscar Kokoschka, who lived in Prague from 1934 to 1938, played an important role in these events. Košvanec's paintings were more "praguese" at that moment: women appeared elegant, stylish, half-naked, surrounded by a flowering nature over the hills of Petrin, "in the greenish shade of wide gardens and leafy trees" in the quiet Hradcany, and these nymphs revealed the secret charm of Malá Strana and of St. Nicholas Church.

=== The War ===
After the arrival of the Nazi troops in Prague, on 15 March 1939, the German protectorate began to enact a series of anti-Jewish measures. The extermination of Jewish people started then, and Czech Resistance was violently repressed. Košvanec gave his fur coat to German soldiers on the public square, during a fundraising for the German troops in Stalingrad in winter 1942–1943, when the Second World War broke out. This theatrical gesture, which was judged to be outrageous, caused a collaborationism accuse and the immediate expulsion from the Association of Czech artists (Blok ceských výtvarníku) once the war finished.

In 1947, Košvanec was put on trial. The artist was convicted, imprisoned and forced to pay a fine of 40,000 CZK. On 29 September 1949, his wife died, he fell into a deep depression and suffered a total nervous breakdown that forced him to stay in a mental hospital. It seems that he was freed, thanks to the remission of the rest of the sentence, between 1949 and 1950.

=== Death ===
Košvanec painted illegally during the 1950s. The artist fell in love with a young Gypsy woman. He spent his last years in complete isolation until November 1961 when, at the age of 74, died forgotten by everybody and his body was buried at the Olšany Cemetery Prague.
