= Alois Bohdan Brixius =

Czech traveller, orientalist and journalist

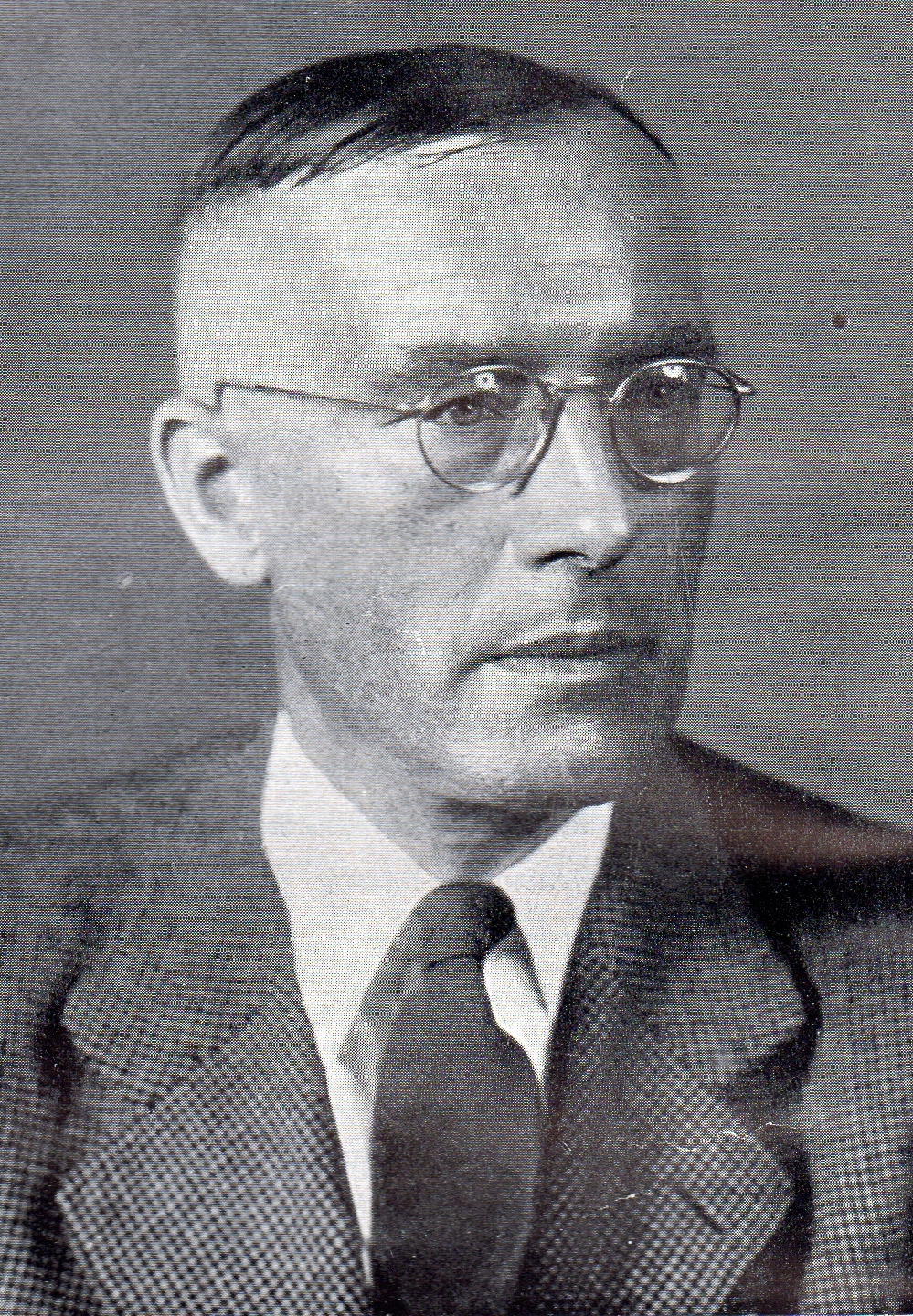
Brixius in c. 1943

Alois Bohdan Brixius (30 September 1903 – 19 February 1959) was a Czech traveller, orientalist, journalist and travel writer.

== Biography ==
He was born on 30 September 1903 in Bohinj. In the 1920s and 1930s, he made several trips to the Middle East. After conversion to Islam, he published under the name Mohamed Abdallah-hadži Brikcius. He was an active member of Vlajka since 1936.

Brixius became the first Czech to make a pilgrimage to Mecca. He died on 19 February 1959 in Prague. He is buried at the Olšany Cemetery in Prague.
