= Eliška Řeháková =

Czech teacher, translator, journalist and suffragist (1846–1916)

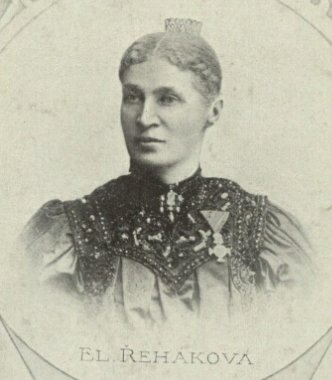
- Born: 20 January 1846; Prague, Bohemia, Austrian Empire
- Died: 31 March 1916 (aged 70); Prague, Bohemia, Austria-Hungary
- Burial place: Olšany Cemetery
- Occupations: teacher, translator, suffragist
- Employer: Old Town Burgher School for Girls
- Organization(s): Association of Czech Female Teachers, American Club of Czech Ladies
- Relatives: Anna Řeháková (sister)
- Awards: Civil Merit Cross of Austria Hungary

Eliška Řeháková (20 January 1846 – 31 March 1916) was a Czech teacher, translator, journalist and suffragist. She was awarded the Civil Merit Cross of Austria-Hungary.

== Family and early life ==
Řeháková was born on 20 January 1846 in Prague. She was one of seven siblings, including her sister Anna Řeháková. Her parents were Václav Řehak, the owner of a grocer's shop, and Maria Řehaková-Zelenská, from Kutná Hora.

In her youth, Řeháková was a member of the Society of Czech Girls, co-founded by Bohuslava Rajská, F. Amerlingová and Božena Němcová.

== Career ==
Řeháková worked as a teacher. From 1867 to 1870, she tutored of the daughters of František Štekl, a notary in Pelhřimov, before being appointed a temporary sub-teacher at the newly established girls' primary school in Čáslav.

In 1873, Řeháková returned to Prague to teach at an elementary school, then was employed to teach grammar and history at the newly established Old Town Burgher School for Girls, the first burgher girls' school in Prague. She later became an executive of the first girls' grammar school in the Habsburg Empire.

Řeháková's sister Anna was also a teacher and they often shared lodgings together and travelled abroad with each other. They both became members of the Association of Czech Female Teachers and the American Club of Czech Ladies.

Řeháková translated texts from French and Italian and wrote Czech literature.

She was awarded the Civil Merit Cross of Austria-Hungary by Emperor Franz Joseph I of Austria in 1898.

== Death ==
Řeháková died on 31 March 1916 in Prague, aged 70. She was buried at the Olšany Cemetery in Prague and when her sister Anna died in 1937, she was interred with Eliška.
