= Jan Konůpek =

Czech illustrator, painter and engraver (1883–1950)

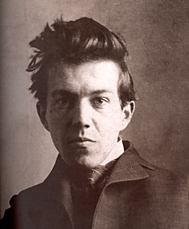
- Born: 10 October 1883; Mladá Boleslav, Bohemia, Austria-Hungary
- Died: 13 March 1950 (aged 66); Prague, Czechoslovakia
- Resting place: Olšany Cemetery
- Education: Prague Polytechnical Institute
- Movement: Surrealism

Jan Konůpek (10 October 1883 – 13 March 1950) was a Czech illustrator, painter and engraver. A list of his graphic works comprises 1448 works and more than 600 book illustrations. He is among the three greatest known Czechs for interwar art, alongside František Kobliha and František Drtikol.

== Life and education ==
Konůpek was born on 10 October 1883 in Mladá Boleslav. From 1903 to 1906, he studied architecture at Prague Polytechnical Institute in Prague, but under the influence of Pavel Janák and Václav Vilém Štech, he switched to art. From 1906 to 1908, he studied in Professor Maximilian Pirner's studio.

Konůpek died on 13 March 1950 in Prague.

== Art ==
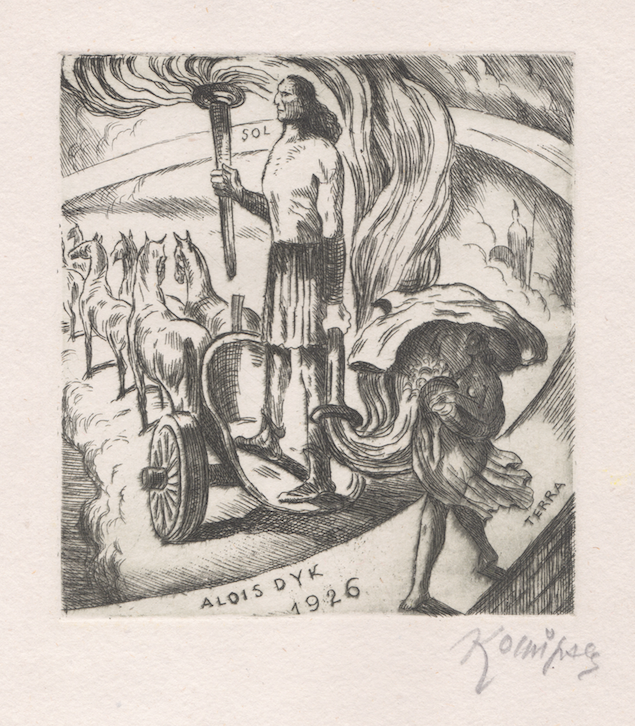
Oheň Moudrosti, 1926

Being one of the founding members of Sursum, a Czech second-generation symbolist movement group, he drew inspiration from medieval mysticism, and Gothic and Baroque architecture. His works from the early 20th century, influenced by symbolism and Gustav Klimt, are considered his best. He illustrated symbolist literature as well as works by Karel Jaromír Erben (Kytice) and Karel Hynek Mácha (Máj) and many others.
