= Anna Ptáčková =

Czech teacher and feminist

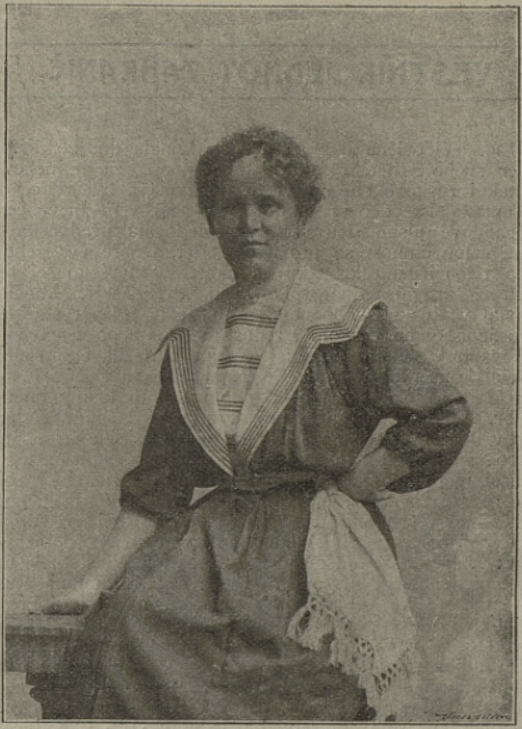
- Born: 28 September 1856; Bohemia, Austrian Empire
- Died: 3 January 1906 (aged 49); Smíchov, Bohemia, Austria-Hungary
- Occupations: Physical education teacher; feminist; writer

Anna Ptáčková (28 September 1856 – 3 January 1906) was a Czech physical education teacher, suffragette, feminist and writer. She made significant contributions to women's rights and physical education in the late 19th and early 20th centuries.

== Life and education ==
Ptáčková was born on 28 September 1856 in Bohemia, Austrian Empire. She grew up during a time of social and political change in Central Europe. She developed a passion for physical education and women's rights from an early age.

She died on 3 January 1906 and is buried at the Olšany Cemetery in Prague.

== Work and career ==
Ptáčková was a prominent member of the Sokol movement, which played a crucial role in the Czech National Revival. Her most notable achievement was serving as the head of the Gymnastics Association of Ladies and Girls of Prague, where she promoted physical education for women.

In addition to her work in physical education and activism, Ptáčková was also a professional writer.

As a suffragette and feminist, Ptáčková advocated for women's rights, particularly women's suffrage, equal access to education, and the participation of women in sports and physical activities. Her work as both an educator and activist helped challenge prevailing gender norms in Czech society during the late 19th and early 20th centuries.
