= Nové Dvory (Žďár nad Sázavou District) =

- Municipality
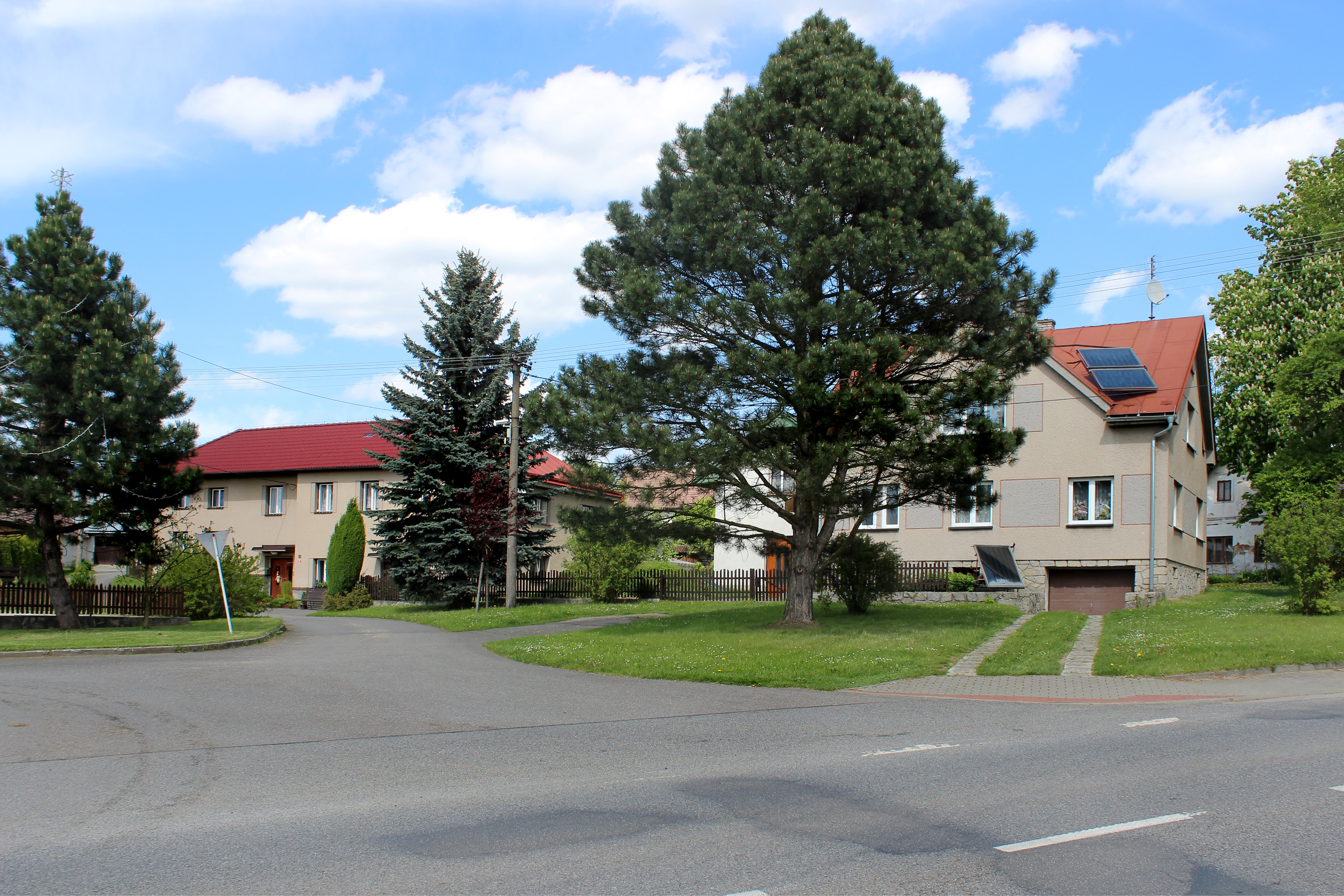
- Upper part of Nové Dvory

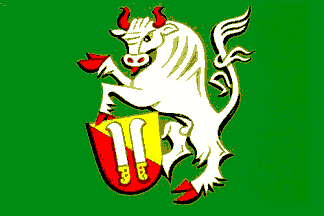
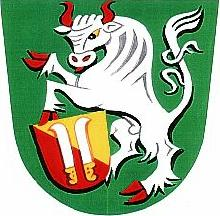
- Flag Coat of arms

- Location in the Czech Republic
- Coordinates: 49°33′52″N 16°48′32″E
- Country: Czech Republic
- Region: Vysočina
- District: Žďár nad Sázavou
- First mentioned: 1444

Area
  - Total: 5.52 km^{2} (2.13 sq mi)
- Elevation: 505 m (1,657 ft)

Population (2026-01-01)
  - Total: 326
  - Density: 59.1/km^{2} (153/sq mi)
- Time zone: UTC+1 (CET)
  - Summer (DST): UTC+2 (CEST)
- Postal code: 592 12
- Website: www.novedvory.eu

Nové Dvory is a municipality and village in Žďár nad Sázavou District in the Vysočina Region of the Czech Republic. It has about 300 inhabitants.

Nové Dvory lies approximately 10 kilometres (6 mi) west of Žďár nad Sázavou, 24 km (15 mi) north-east of Jihlava, and 116 km (72 mi) south-east of Prague.

== Demographics ==
Historical population
Year	Pop.	±%
1869	274	—
1880	274	+0.0%
1890	247	−9.9%
1900	259	+4.9%
1910	300	+15.8%
1921	270	−10.0%
1930	290	+7.4%
1950	263	−9.3%
1961	288	+9.5%
1970	272	−5.6%
1980	274	+0.7%
1991	230	−16.1%
2001	239	+3.9%
2011	309	+29.3%
2021	308	−0.3%
Source: Censuses

== Notable people ==
- František Rosický (1847–1909), botanist
