= Vojtěch Rosický =

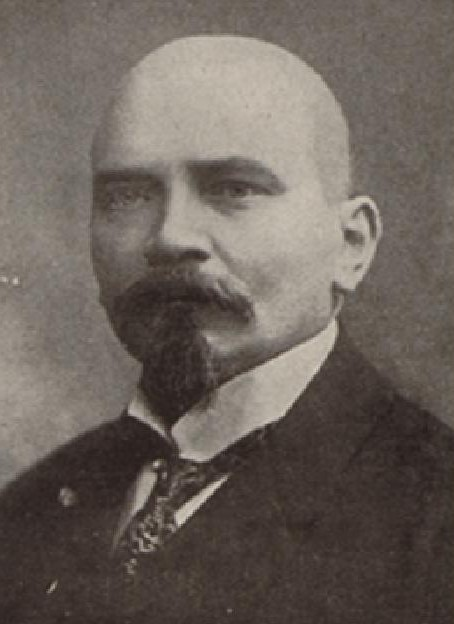
Vojtěch Rosický in 1938

Vojtěch Rosický (30 October 1880 – 9 February 1942) was a Czech professor of mineralogy and petrology. He was arrested for taking part in the resistance group of university teachers and died in the Mauthausen concentration camp. He identified and proposed the mineral names preslite, ultrabasite epidesmine (a synonym of stellerite).

== Life and work ==
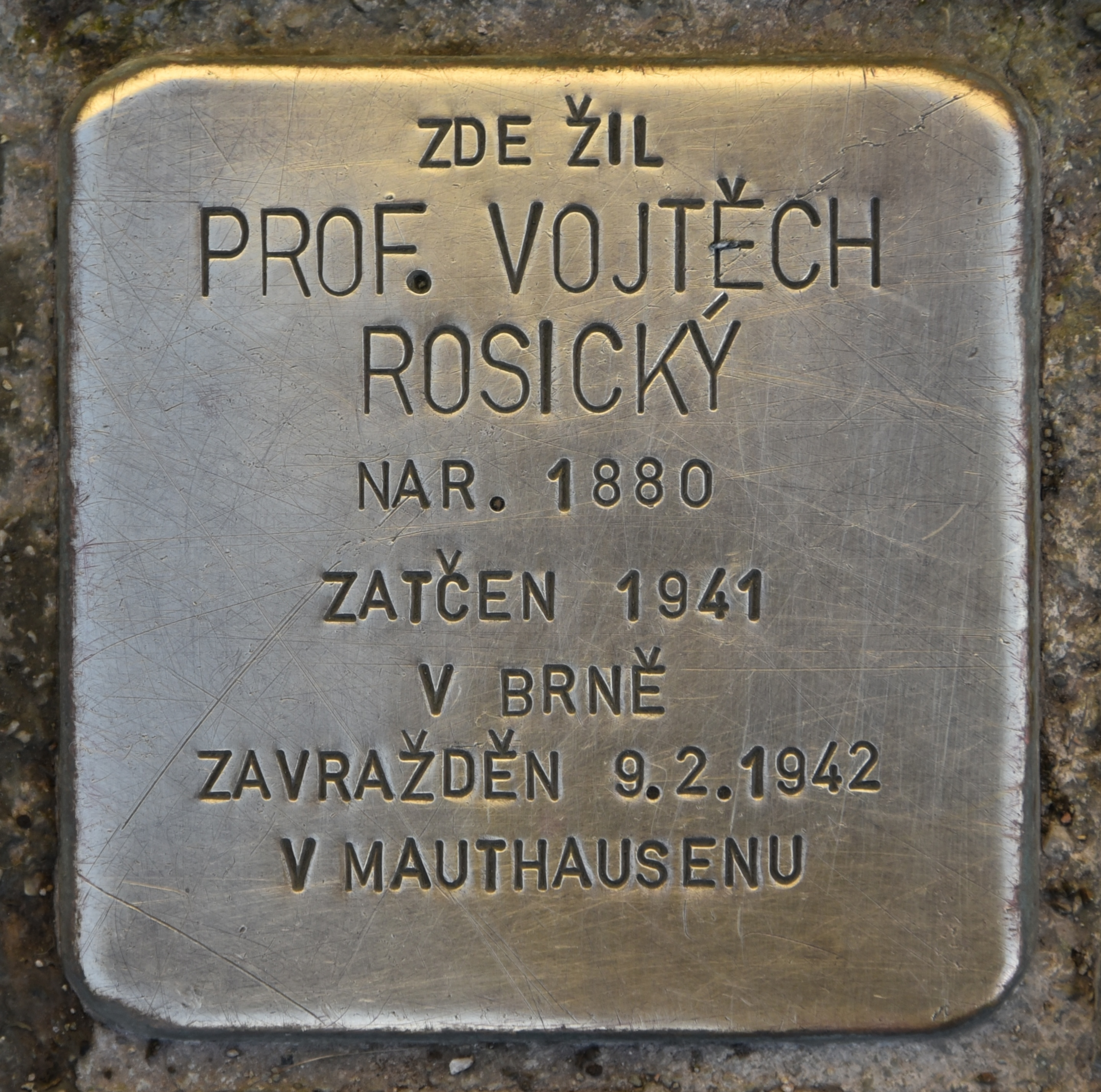
Memorial stolperstein

Rosický was born in Prague, the son of biology teacher František Rosický. After studying at the Real grammar school he went to Charles University in 1899 where he studied natural history, mathematics and physics. He became interested in minerals and began to work on crystallography. He received his doctorate in 1904 studying rocks around Jílové. He spent some time at the Ludwig-Maximilians-Universität München from 1907 until 1908 under Paul Heinrich von Groth, and at Heidelberg University from 1908 until 1909. He then worked at Charles University where, in 1919, he became extraordinary professor of mineralogy and petrography. The next year, he became a professor. When the Masaryk University was established in Brno, he was appointed professor in 1920 and he established a mineralogical institute. In 1922, he became dean of the faculty of science and, from 1925 to 1926, he served as rector. He published a book on crystallography and mineral identification and worked on improvements to goniometry. During the German invasion of 1939, the Czech universities were closed down. Rosický joined a group of university teachers who formed a resistance. The Gestapo arrested him on 12 December 1941 and locked him in Kounicovy College for a year. The next year, he was taken to the Mauthausen concentration camp where he was declared dead.

A posthumous Czechoslovak War Cross was awarded to him. A stolperstein was installed on Drobný street in Brno.
