= Jiřina Šiklová =

Czech sociologist, publicist and feminist (1935–2021)

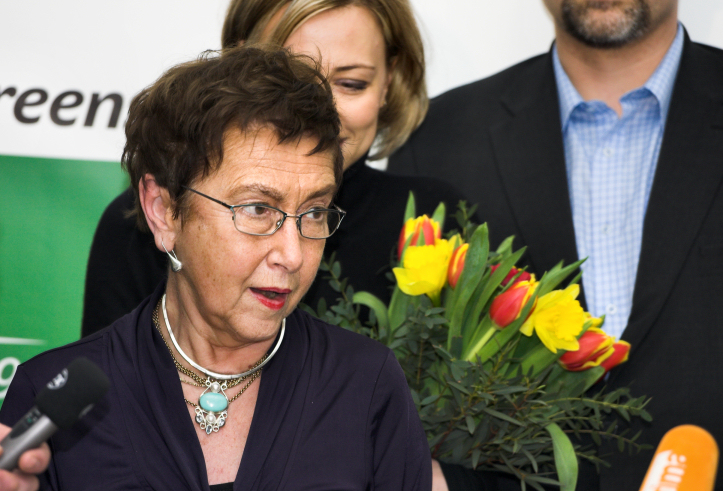
Šiklová at the Green Party in the Czech Republic in 2009

Jiřina Šiklová (17 June 1935 – 22 May 2021) was a Czech sociologist. She was notable for her political engagement and studies of gender in the Czech Republic and former Soviet republics. She was an active campaigner for political reform in Communist Czechoslovakia and was a signatory of Charter 77.

== Life ==
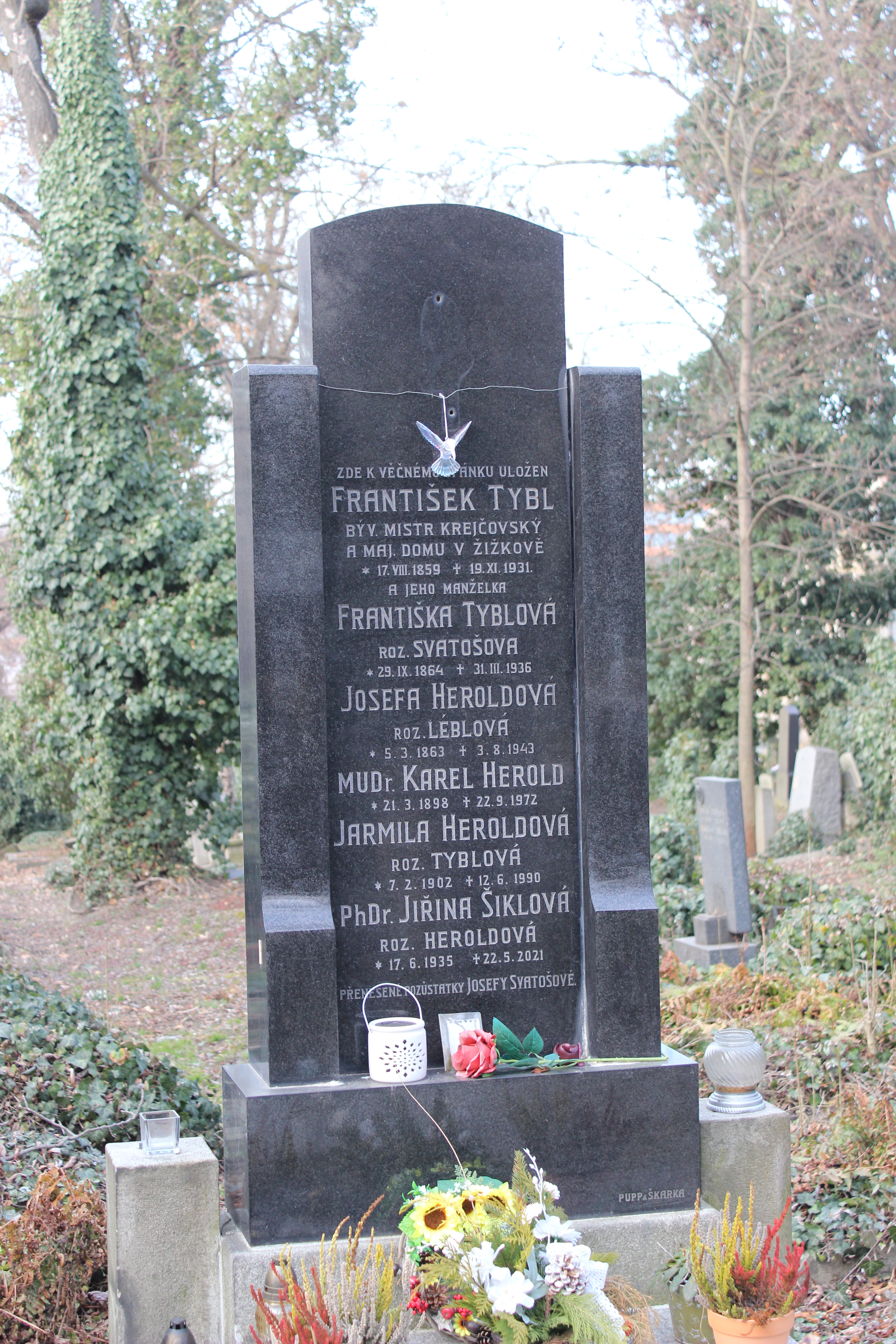
Grave of Šiklová at the Olšany Cemetery

Šiklová was born in Prague on 17 June 1935. She attended Charles University, where she studied history and philosophy. As a member of the Communist Party of Czechoslovakia and an advocate for reform, she was one of the catalysts for the events of the Prague Spring. After the 1968 Soviet invasion of Czechoslovakia, she left the Party and became a member of the underground Czech dissident movement.

Šiklová died on 22 May 2021. She is buried at the Olšany Cemetery.

== Political activism ==
In 1968, Šiklová was forced to leave her position at Charles University and worked as a janitor until 1971, when she was employed as a researcher and social worker at a Prague hospital. Her involvement with Czech dissent led her to be jailed in 1981, and she was hounded by the StB, the Communist Czechoslovak secret police, and frequently brought in for interrogation. Despite persecution by the regime, she continued to write articles and books on sociology that were published abroad. Like many of the women who were part of Czech dissident circles, she acted as a letter carrier between the mostly male dissidents, helping copy letters on carbon paper and deliver them. In her writings on the experience, she noted that while women were literally involved in the "dirty work" of copying and distributing samizdat texts, they were rarely written about or acknowledged for their contribution to Czech dissent.

One of Šiklová's focuses in her writing was what she termed the "Gray Zone" – the clandestine collaboration between the dissidents and reform-minded Communists who remained in the Party. Unlike the majority of Czech citizens who did not fully support the regime but did nothing to actively protest against it, Šiklová identified those in the "gray zone" as educated citizens who were not high-level Party members, and who helped the dissidents without officially being part of their cause.

== Gender studies ==
Šiklová was a pioneer in the field of gender studies in the Czech Republic. She has written on the subject of women in Czech dissent, arguing that the reason women's interests and issues were not represented in Charter 77 – despite the large number of women involved in the creation of the Charter, and especially the number of women involved in the distribution of dissident texts – was that women felt their own concerns were less important than the goal of general societal reform. Though she was interested in and wrote about the role of women in Czech society, she was not exposed to Western feminist theory until after the Velvet Revolution in 1989.

Šiklová helped found the Prague Gender Studies Center, the first feminist organization in the Czech Republic. She has been critical of the population growth policy of the Czech Republic, arguing that the social cost and other negative effects of overpopulation should be more carefully considered, and that spending on education should be a part of population policy.

== Honours ==
- Medal of Merit (1999)
