= František Vilém Rosický =

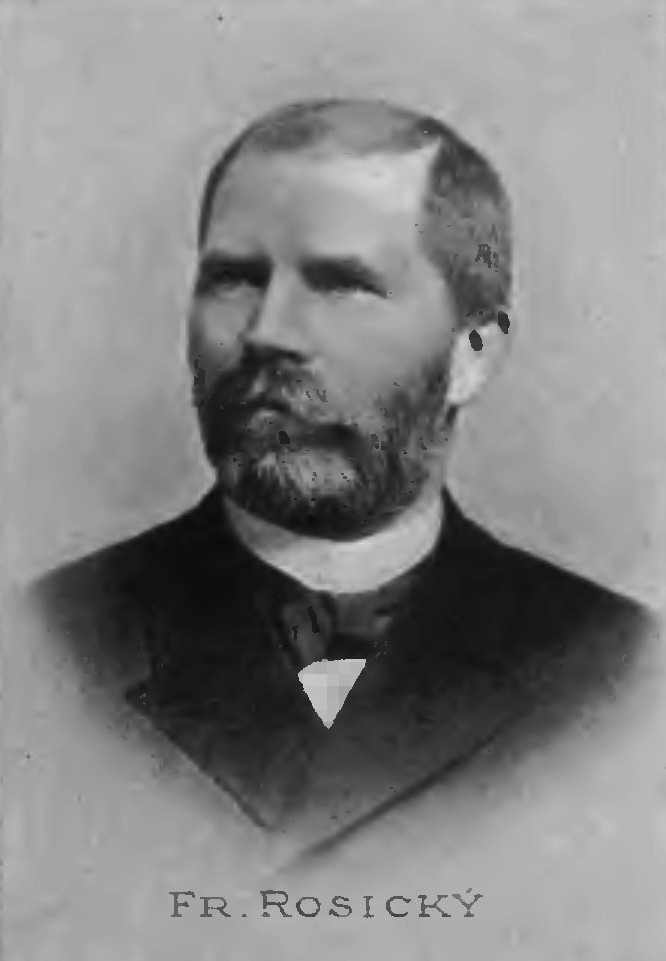
Rosický in 1898

František Vilém Rosický (17 December 1847 – 17 July 1909) was a Czech botanist, zoologist and high school pedagogue. His most notable work is a book on the seasonal flowering plants of Bohemia. His son was the mineralogist Vojtěch Rosický.

== Life and family ==
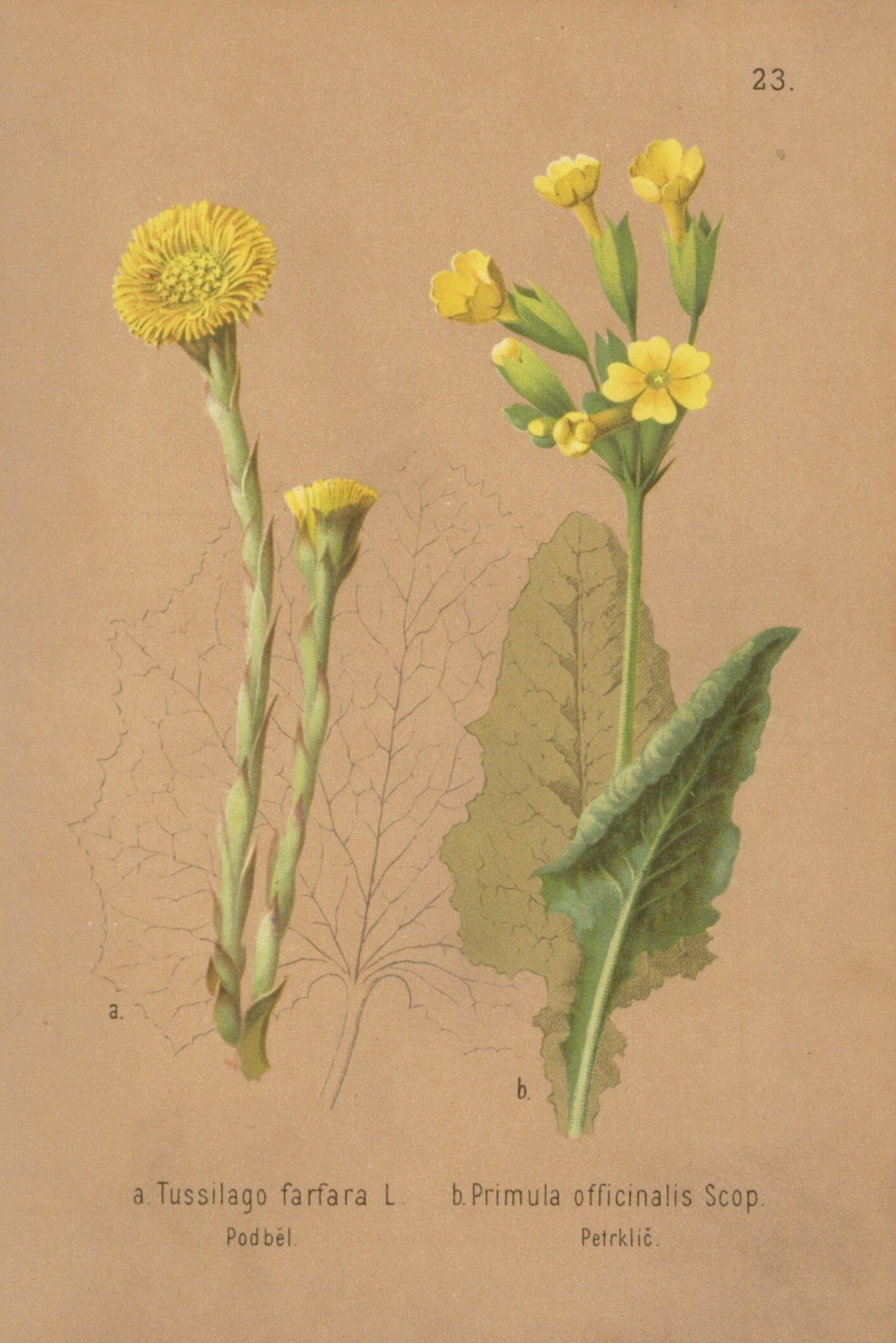
A plate from Květiny jarní ze zvláštním zřetelem ku květeně domácí (1885)

Rosický was born on 17 December 1847 in Nové Dvory, the son of Vojtěch and Marie née Běloušková. He worked in Prague from 1870 as a school teacher. He became involved in local natural history. From 1888, he headed a gymnasium in Roudnice nad Labem and from 1894 he was a school inspector.

František's brother Josef (born 1860) was also a school teacher and wrote books on the seasonal flora. František Rosický married Maria Webrová in 1877. Their son Vojtěch Rosický (1880–1942) was a mineralogist and Nazi victim. They has also two daughters, Marie and Věnceslava.

Rosický died on 17 July 1909 in Prague and was buried at the Prague's Olšany Cemetery.

== Work ==
Rosický's work include:

- Stonožky země české [Centipedes of the Bohemian land] (1876) – a work on the centipedes of Bohemia
- Nerostopis pro nižší třídy středních škol [Mineralogy for lower secondary school classes] (1883) – a high school textbook
- Botanika pro vyšší třídy středních škol [Botany for upper secondary school classes] (1884) – a high school textbook
- Květiny jarní se zvláštním zřetelem ku květeně domácí [Spring flowers with special interest in native flora] (1885) – a popular science book, his most notable work
- Rostlinopis pro ústavy ku vzdělání učitelů [Botany for teacher training institutes] (1895) – written together with Josef Rosický

He also translated the Alois Pokorný's book Názorný přírodopis živočišstva [Illustrated natural history of animals] from German into Czech.

== Honours ==
In 1902, Rosický received the Order of the Iron Crown (3rd Class) and was promoted to knight.
