= Libuše Stratilová =

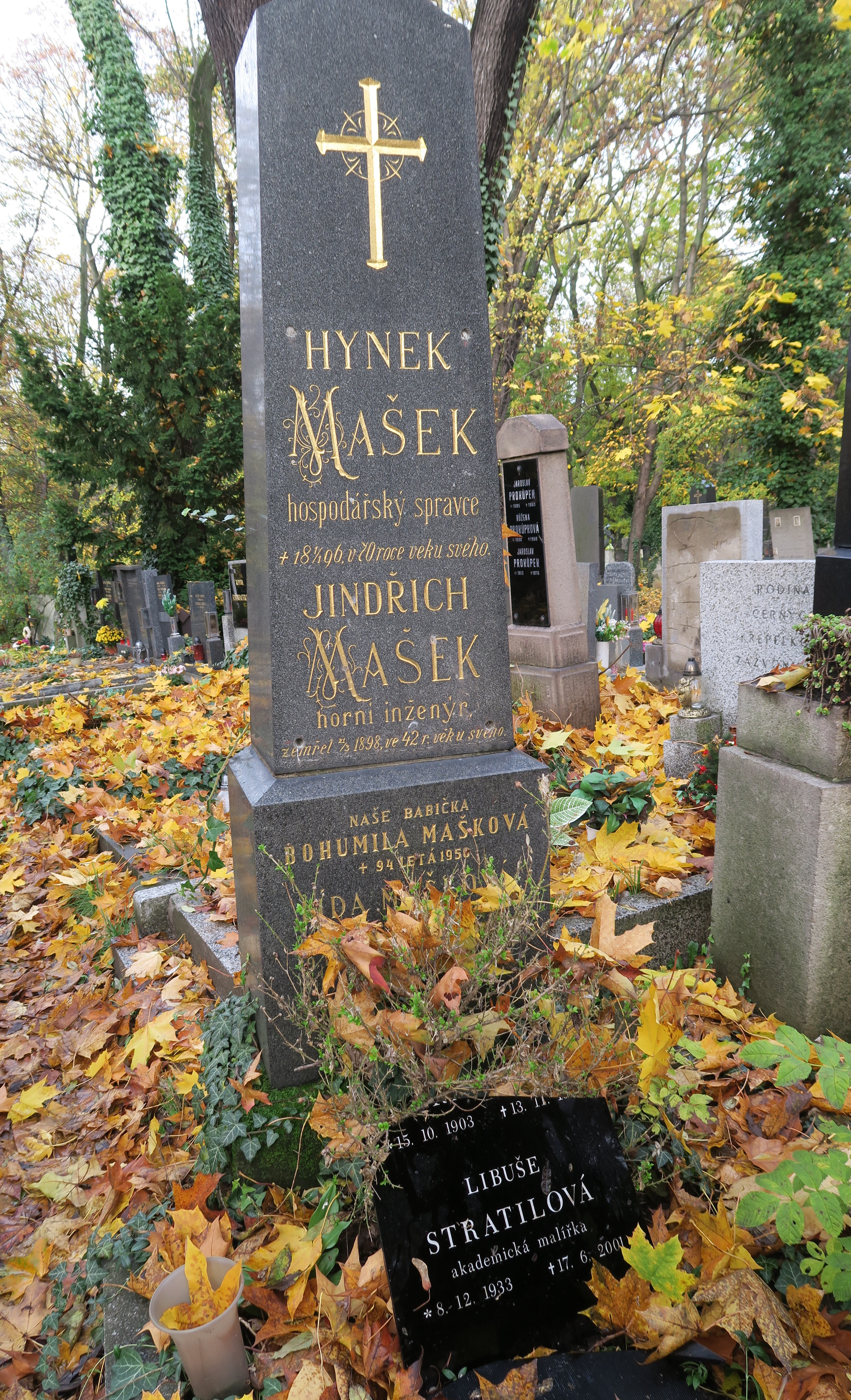
Stratilová's grave at Olšany Cemetery

Libuše Stratilová (8 December 1933 – 17 June 2001) was a Czech academic painter and printmaker.

== Life ==
Stratilová was born on 8 December 1933 in Olomouc. She studied at the Academy of Arts, Architecture and Design in Prague under Karel Svolinský and graduated in 1959. Since 1961, she had been employed as professor at SOŠV (now Výtvarná škola Václava Hollara in Prague). Her work developed from expressive realism and lyrical abstraction to spiritual imagination. She has produced book illustrations and architectural renderings in addition to prints. Two of her works are in the collection of the National Gallery of Art. She has held 12 individual exhibitions, and taken park in 23 collective exhibitions in Great Britain, Poland and Holland. She is also represented in public collections – Gallery of Graphic Art in Oloumouc and Dr. Zavřel Gallery in the Netherlands.
