= Anna Řeháková =

Czech teacher, writer and translator (1850–1937)

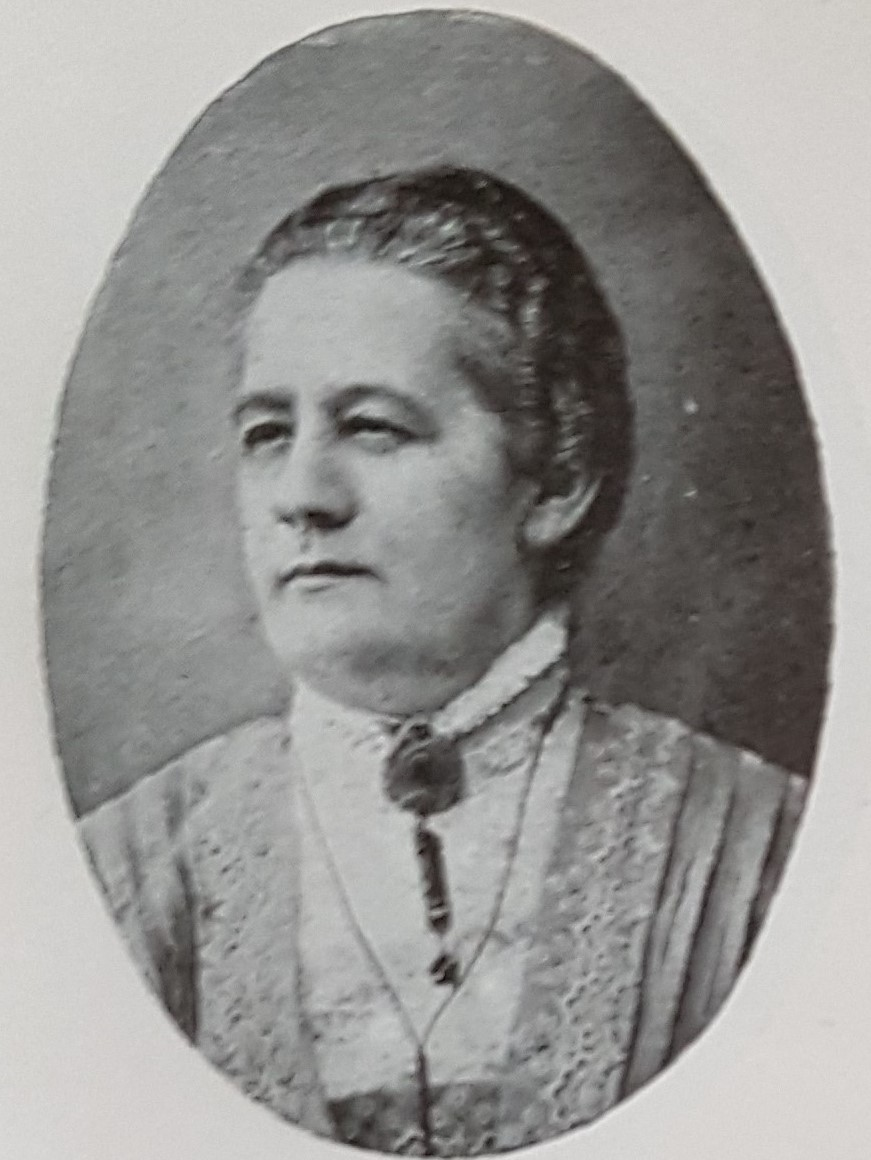
- Born: 16 July 1850; Prague, Bohemia, Austrian Empire
- Died: 27 May 1937 (aged 86); Prague, Czechoslovakia
- Burial place: Olšany Cemetery
- Occupations: teacher, writer and travel diarist
- Relatives: Eliška Řeháková (sister)

Anna Řeháková (16 July 1850 – 27 May 1937) was a Czech teacher, translator, travel writer and novelist.

== Family ==
Řeháková was born in 1850 in Žitnobranská Street, Prague and was one of seven siblings, including her sister Eliška Řeháková. Her parents were Václav Řehak, the owner of a grocer's shop, and Maria Řeháková-Zelenská, who was from Kutná Hora.

== Career ==
Řeháková worked as a teacher at the St. Thomas School in Prague for thirty years, contributing to a rise in standards of girls education. Her sister Eliška was also a teacher and they often shared lodgings together and travelled abroad with each other. They both became members of the Association of Czech Female Teachers and the American Club of Czech Ladies.

== Writing ==
Alongside teaching, Řeháková was a writer. She contributed to Czech language magazines and translated German women's novels into Czech. She published several travelogue books based on the experiences of her travels in Europe, where she promoted travel to Slovenia and Slovakia. She also wrote works of fiction, including the epistolary novel Andělská srdce (Angelic Hearts, 1905) which featured idealistic representations of patriotic young Czech women who were kind, self-sacrificing and humble.

== Death ==
Řeháková died in 1937 in Prague and was buried with her sister at the Olšany Cemetery in Prague.
