= Louisa Piepenhagen =

Czech artist (1825–1893)

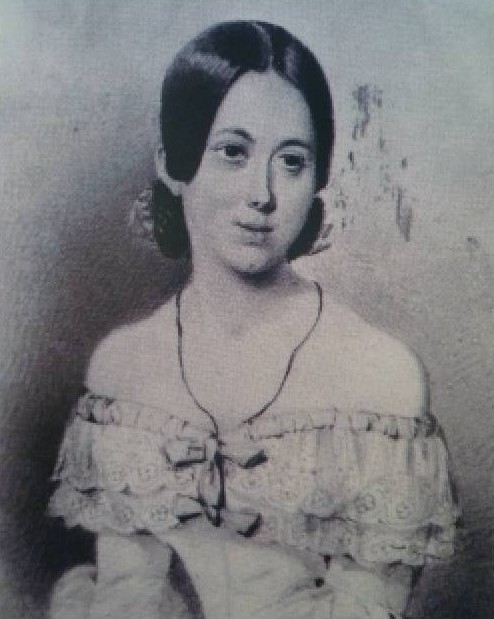
Louisa Piepenhagen (date unknown)

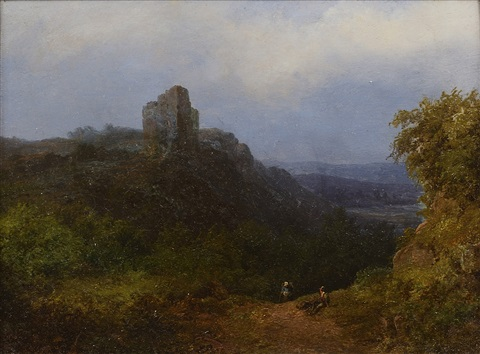
View of Castle with Forested Valley

Louisa Piepenhagen, or Louisa Kannengiesser-Piepenhagen (11 May 1825 – 4 November 1893) was a Czech landscape and genre painter in the Romantic style.

== Biography ==
She was born on 11 May 1825 in Prague, Bohemia, Austrian Empire. She was the youngest of four children born to the painter, August Piepenhagen. She and her older sister, Charlotte, who also became a landscape painter, had their first art lessons with their father. From 1852 to 1854, the three of them travelled throughout Germany, France, Belgium and Switzerland. During her later years, she lived alternately in Prague, Plzeň and Vienna.

She married Hermann Kanenngiesser in Prussia in the 60s. After his death in 1876 she established her residency in Prague, she registered as the widow "Louisa Kannengiesser, née Piepenhagen".

After 1866, she exhibited regularly with the "Krasoumná jednota" (Society for Promotion of the Arts). She also took another tour of Germany and exhibited several times in Vienna from 1871 to 1875. From 1876, she was established in Prague. In 1884, she made an extended visit to Charlotte in Italy.

She died without issue in Prague on 4 November 1893. She is buried at Olšany Cemetery, together with Charlotte and her father.
