= August Piepenhagen =

Czech-German painter

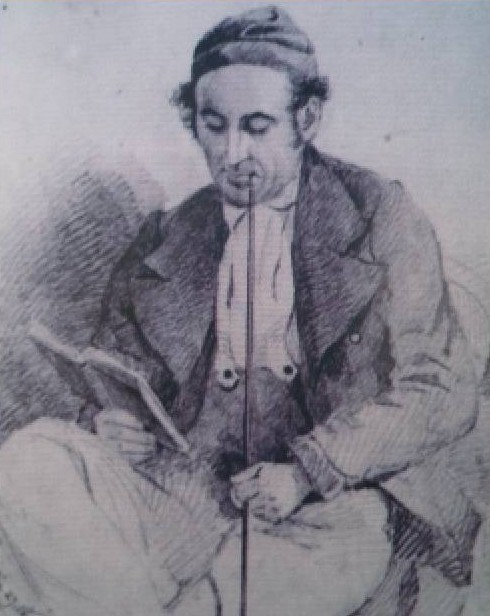
August Piepenhagen (date unknown)

August Friedrich Piepenhagen (Czech: August Bedřich Piepenhagen; 2 August 1791 – 27 September 1868) was a Czech-German landscape painter who spent most of his career in Prague.

== Biography ==
Piepenhagen was born in Soldin on 2 August 1791. He came from a humble family. As a child, he was apprenticed to a button and braid maker. After becoming a journeyman, he travelled throughout Europe and was particularly impressed by Switzerland, which led him to make some attempts at painting. He stayed briefly in Zurich and took some basic lessons from Johann Heinrich Wüest, but was otherwise entirely self-taught.

The year 1811 found him in Prague, where he was hired by a button maker. After his employer died, he married his widow and took over the button business. Although successful at his trade, he began to paint more frequently and show his work at the shop. Soon, he was making more money from his paintings and had attracted the attention of the well-known landscape painter, Josef Navrátil. He also earned the admiration of the writer, Adalbert Stifter.

He had four daughters. Two of them, Charlotte and Louisa, took lessons from him and also became landscape painters.

He died on a farm on the outskirts of Prague on 27 September 1868. He was originally buried at the evangelical cemetery in Karlín. Later, he was transferred to a plot at the Olšany Cemetery, which he shares with Louisa and Charlotte. The grave is adorned with a statue by the Czech sculptor, Tomáš Seidan.

== Selected paintings ==
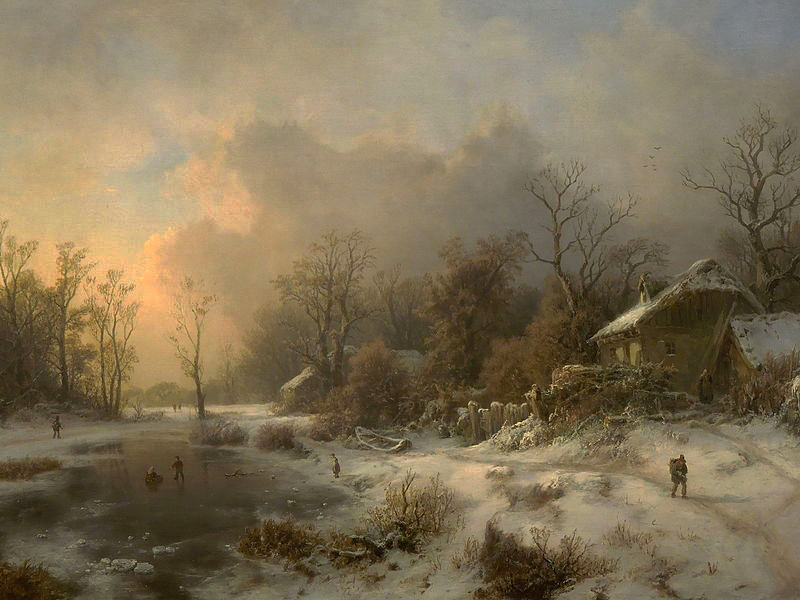
Winter Landscape with
Frozen Pond

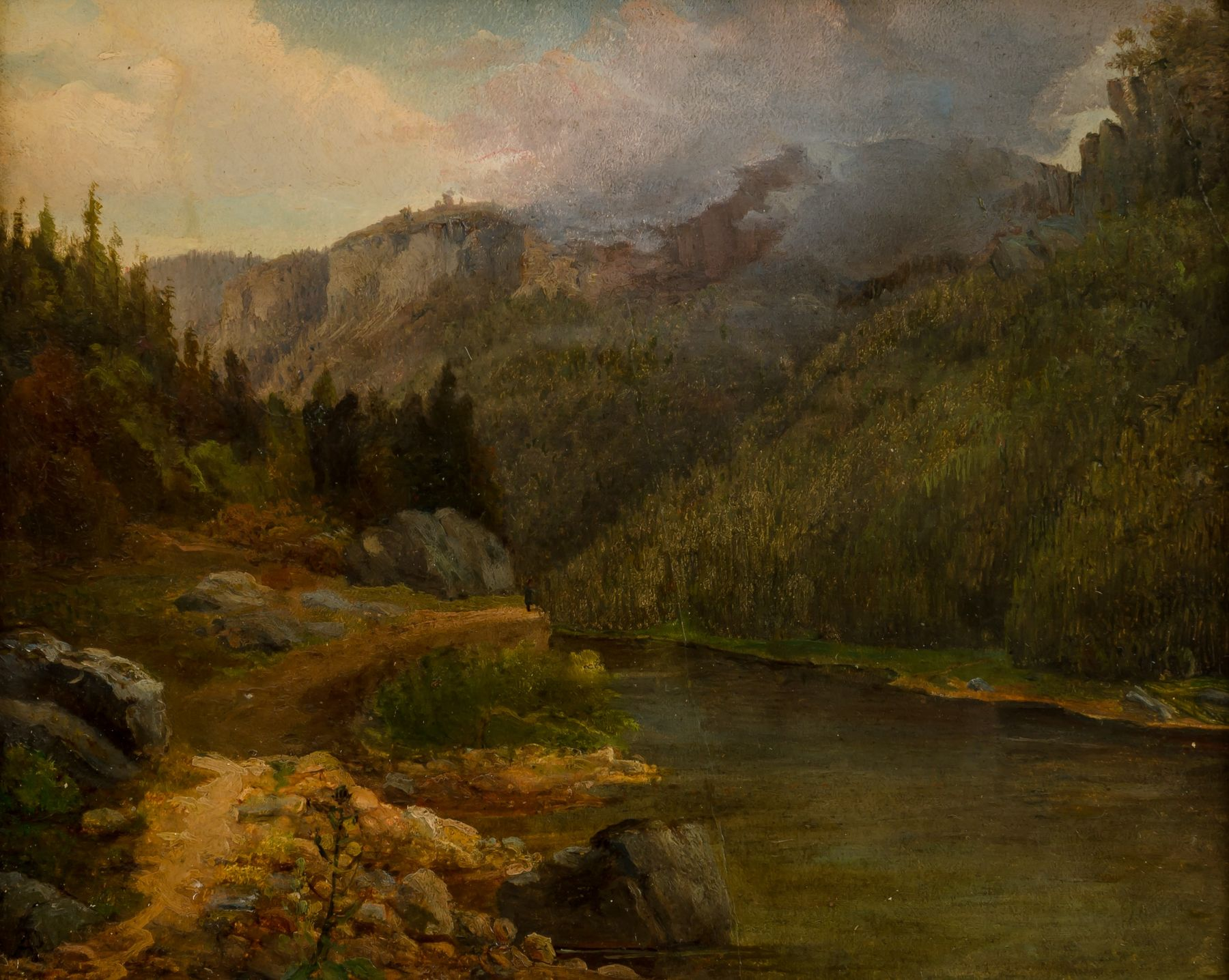
Landscape with Lake

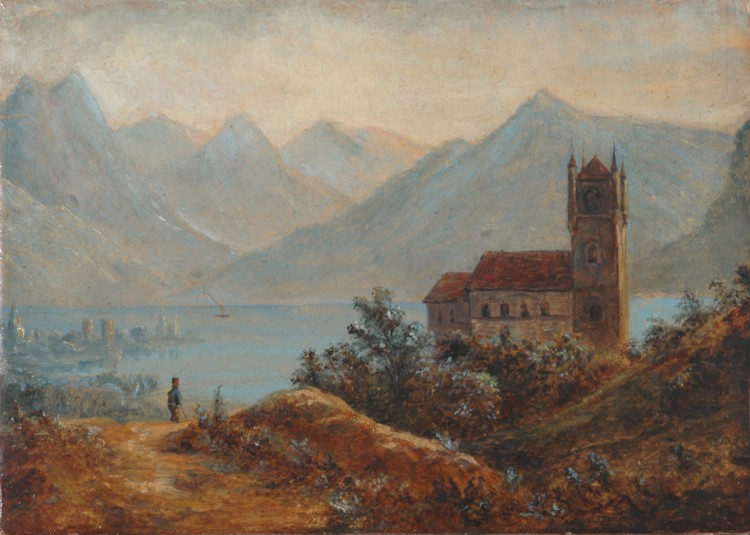
Mountain Landscape with Lake and Church
