= Jan Fleischmann =

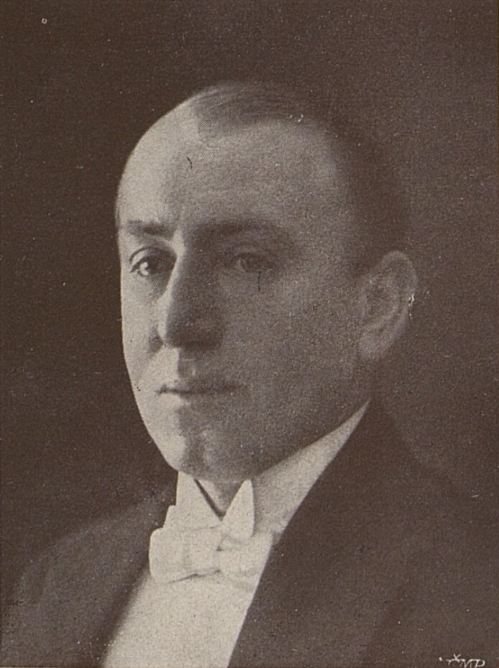
- Born: 6 July 1885 Smíchov, Bohemia, Austria-Hungary
- Died: 23 September 1939 (aged 54) Prague, Protectorate of Bohemia and Moravia
- Position: Defence
- Shot: Left
- National team: Bohemia and Czechoslovakia
- Playing career: 1906–1925

Jan Maria Fleischmann (6 July 1885 – 23 September 1939) was a Czech ice hockey player who competed for Czechoslovakia in the 1924 Winter Olympics.

In 1924, he participated with the Czechoslovak team in the first Winter Olympics ice hockey tournament. His younger brother Miroslav was also a member of the squad.
