= Ivan Ivanovich Lapshin =

Russian philosopher, publicist, translator and teacher

- Ива́н Ива́нович Лапши́н
- Born: 11 October 1870; Moscow, Russian Empire
- Died: 17 November 1952 (age 82); Prague, Czechoslovakia
- Education: Saint Petersburg University
- Known for: Philosopher

Ivan Ivanovich Lapshin (11 October 1870 – 17 November 1952) was a Russian philosopher, publicist, translator and teacher.

== Biography ==
Lapshin was born on 11 October in Moscow. He graduated with his Masters from the Faculty of History and Philology of St. Petersburg University, where he worked mainly under the guidance of Professor Alexander Ivanovich Vvedensky(rus).

In the autumn of 1892, he presented his first major work, The Controversy between Gassendi and Descartes on the Meditation (300 pages), for consideration at the faculty. In 1893, at the end of the course, he was left at the university at the department of philosophy "to prepare for a professorship."

He taught logic at the Alexander Lyceum, psychology at women's gymnasiums; the history of pedagogical theories at higher women's and military pedagogical courses. In 1906, he was awarded a Doctorate in Philosophy with his dissertation, "The Laws of Thought and Forms of Cognition."

At St. Petersburg University, he taught courses on the history of pedagogical theories, on the critical theory of knowledge, on the history of skepticism, and on the history of philosophy in the 19th century. He also supervised the practical classes of students on the study of Kant (analysis of the works " Prolegomena " and "Critique of Pure Reason" ).

He taught philosophical subjects at the Pedagogical Institute and the history of philosophy in the courses of Professor Peter Lesgaft.

In 1922 he was expelled from Soviet Russia on a "philosophical ship." Beginning in 1923 in Czechoslovakia, he began to be a professor at the Russian Faculty of Law, later at the Russian National University in Prague. While in Prague, he participated in the group known as the "Zbraslav Fridays literary and musical association." He died on 17 November 1952 in Prague, at the age of 82.
