= Anna Náprstková =

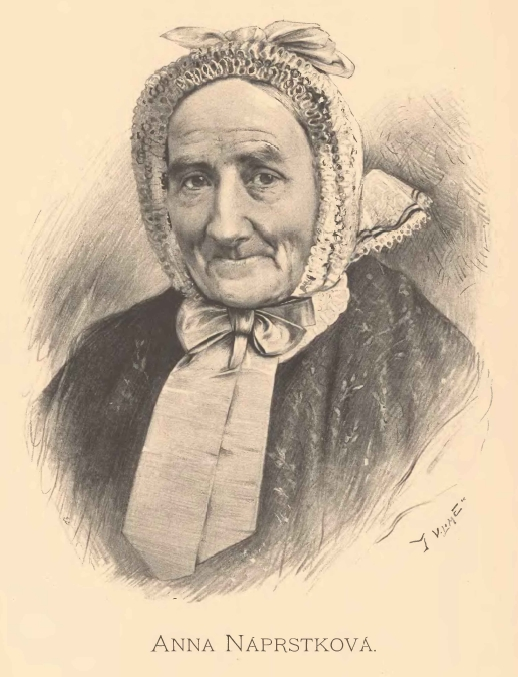
Anna Náprstková

Anna Náprstková (24 April 1788, Prague – 20 October 1873, Prague) was a Czech businesswoman and philanthropist. She made a name for herself as a brewer in Sturm in the Old Town of Prague with her second husband Antonín Fingerhut, whom she married in 1823. The couple bought the Renaissance house U Halánků House, which they converted into a distillery and wine shop. It became a successful business.

Náprstková became known for charitable work, particularly her patronage of national events and education. A trip to the United States in the 1840s inspired Náprstková to take a proactive role in development. She was responsible for the establishment of an industrial museum and the American Ladies Club at U Halánků House on Bethlehem Square.

She has been described as a "determined and life-hardened woman who had an extraordinary business spirit but also an open heart and hands for those who needed it."
