= Charlotte Piepenhagen =

Czech artist (1821–1902)

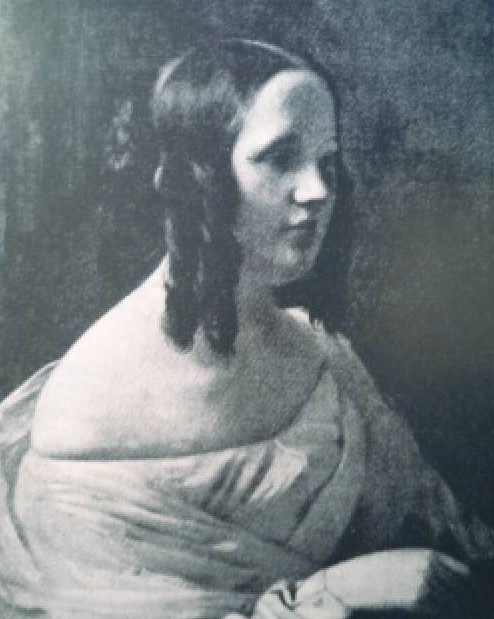
- Born: 19 October 1821; Prague, Bohemia, Austrian Empire
- Died: 3 January 1902 (aged 80); Prague, Bohemia, Austria-Hungary
- Known for: Painting
- Movement: Romanticism
- Spouses: Clement von Weyrother (m. 1852–1876) Karl Mohr (m. 1876–1885)

Charlotte Ludmila Weyrother-Mohr-Piepenhagen (19 October 1821 – 3 January 1902) was a Czech landscape painter and lithographer in the Romantic style.

== Biography ==
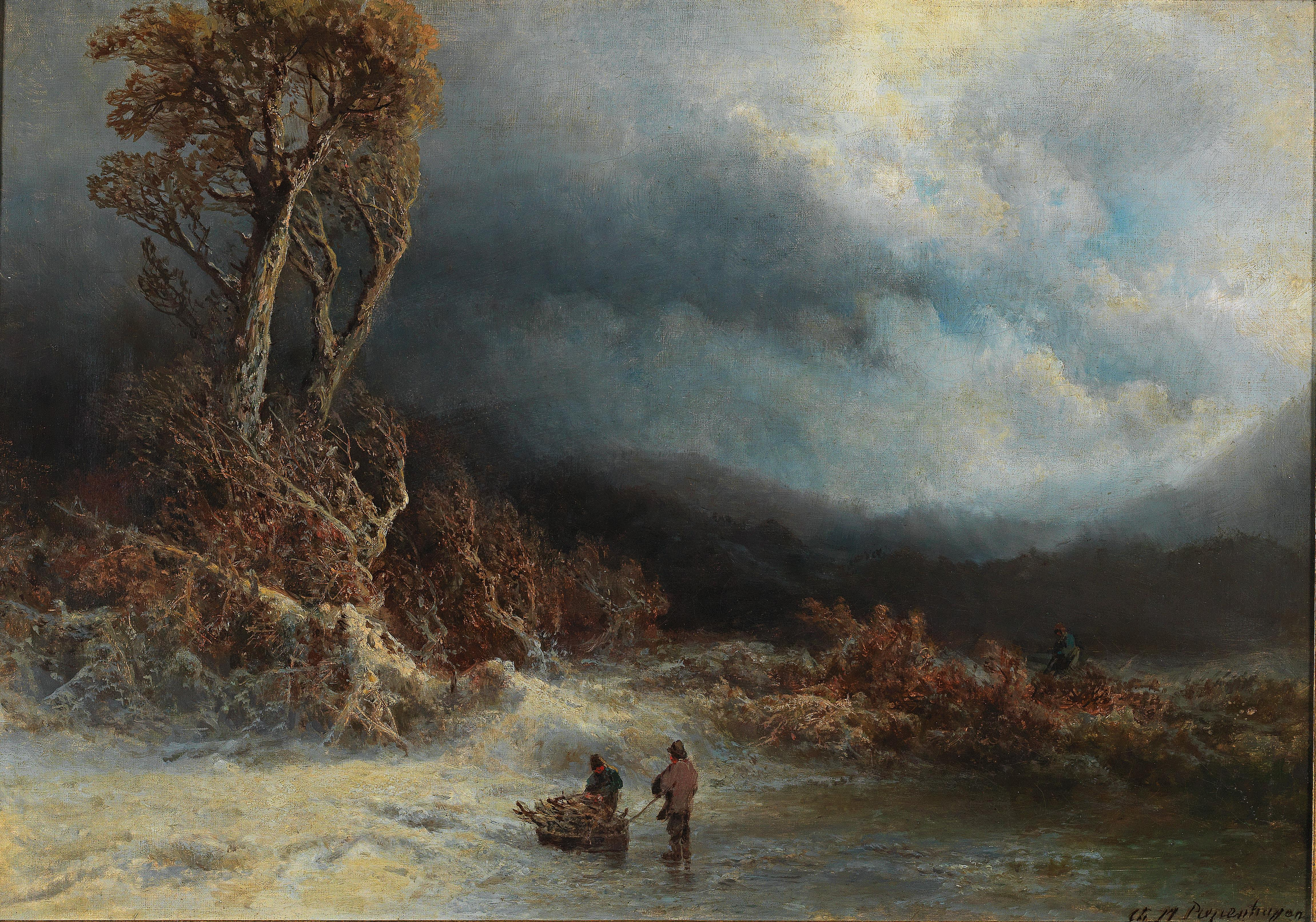
Winter Landscape with Brushwood Collectors

She was born in Prague, Bohemia, Austrian Empire (now the Czech Republic) on 19 October 1821. She was one of four children born to the landscape painter of Brandenburgian (German) origin, August Piepenhagen. She and her younger sister, Louisa, took their first art lessons with him at home, as women were not accepted in the public art schools.

In 1838, she had her first showing with Czech artistic organisation Krasoumná jednota ("Society for Promotion of the Arts"), of which she was a member from 1878 to 1890. She also exhibited at the Vienna Künstlerhaus from 1872 to 1886 and had a major showing at the International Art Exhibition in Munich in 1879.

In 1852, she married Clemens von Weyrother (1809–1876); a nobleman. Over the next two years, she travelled with her father and Louisa to Germany, France, Belgium and Switzerland. In 1866, she made another tour of Germany. She settled in Vienna in 1872. After her husband's death, she married Colonel Karl Mohr. From 1881 to 1884, she spent much of her time in Italy. After being widowed again in 1885, she remained single. Both marriages were childless.

In 1888, she settled in Prague, where she established a private art school for girls. Piepenhagen died in that city on 3 January 1902.

In her will, she bequeathed 56,000 krones to establish a foundation for the support of young landscape painters.
