= Napoleon Manuel Kheil =

Czech zoologist and entomologist

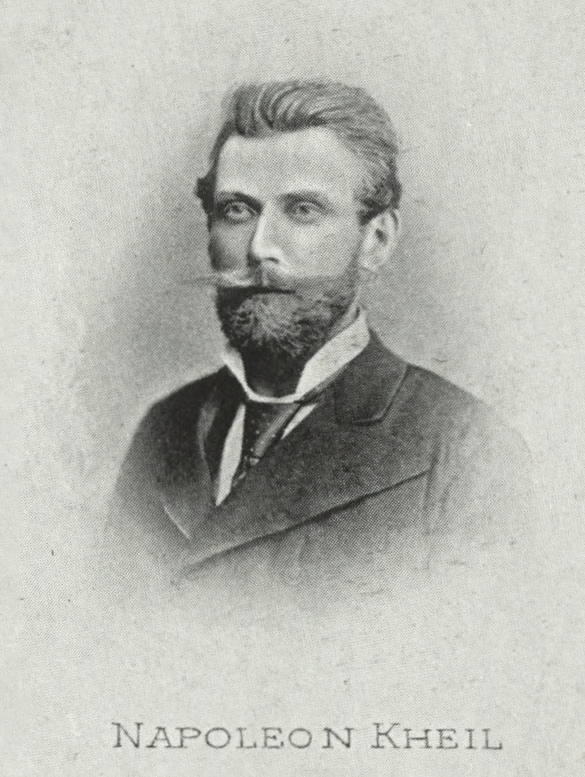
Napoleon M. Kheil around 1899

Napoleon Manuel Kheil (19 October 1849 – 1 November 1923) was a Czech zoologist and entomologist who specialised in Lepidoptera and Orthoptera.

== Life ==
Napoleon Manuel Kheil was born in Prague, Bohemia, Austrian Empire on 19 October 1849. He was the owner of a private business school and Professor and author in the field of commercial matters at the Czech Technical University in Prague. HE died in Prague on 1 November 1923.

== Travels and translations ==
He explored the flora and fauna of the Sierra Nevada and other regions of Spain and translated into Czech Pedro Calderon De La Barca's play Life is a dream. Also in Czech he published some monographs related to Spain. Khiel was very talented with regards to languages. Besides Czech and Spanish, he also spoke fluent German, and French. He is buried at Olšany Cemetery in Prague.

== Kheil's collection ==
A collector who in his time had one of the largest private collections of insects collected in Czechoslovakia Napoleon Manuel Kheil was a member and one of the founders of the Czech Entomological Society. After his death, his collection of more than 27,000 specimen of insects was bequeathed by the National Museum in Prague. It is now kept by its entomological department.

== Works ==
Entomology partial list

- Kheil, N.M, 1884 Zur Fauna des Indo-Malayischen Archipels. Die Rhoplalocera der Insel Nias Rhopalocera Ins. Nias : [1-5], 6-38, 5pls. Berlin.R. Friedlander & Sohn. Includes a general description of the island and its inhabitants, and a list of 149 butterflies, with occasional notes on known species, and descriptions of several new ones, illustrated by photographic plates.
- Kheil, N.M., 1890 Ueber geschlechtlichen Dimorphismus des abessynischen Pap. antinorii Oberthur. Deutsche Entomologische Zeitschrift, Iris 3:333-336.
- Kheil, N.M., 1890 Ein neue Danaid. Berliner Entomologische Zeitschrift 33:393-394.
- Kheil, N.M., 1905 Lepidopteros de la Guinea Espanola. Memorias da Real Sociedad Espanol de Historia Natural 1:161-181.
- Kheil N. M., 1916 Die Lepidopteren der Sierra de Espana. 34 pp. International entomol. Zeitschrift 10(8): 41-74.
