= František Horčička =

Czech history and portrait painter

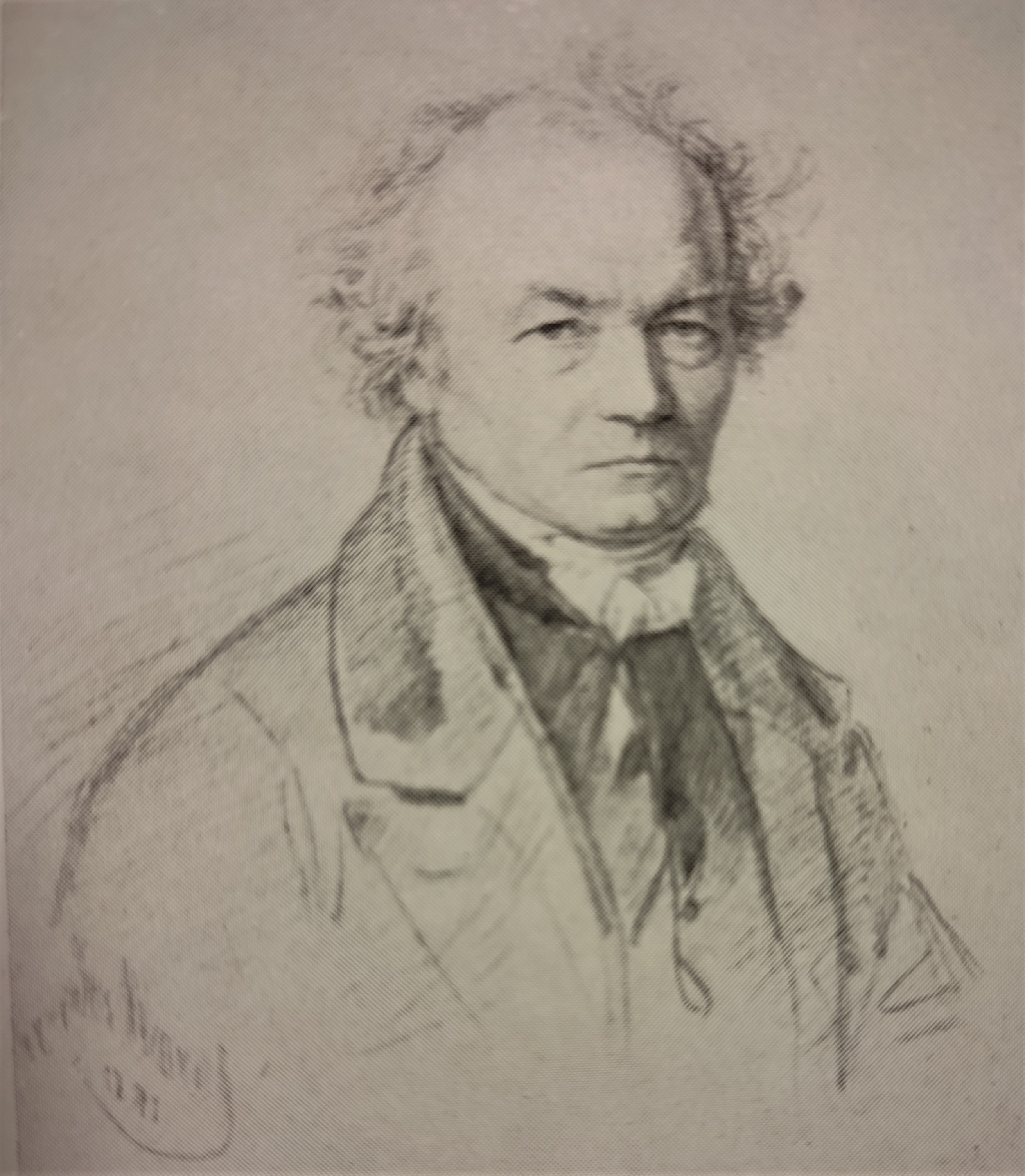
Portrait of František Horčička, drawing signed and dated by Josef Mánes (1841), National Gallery in Prague

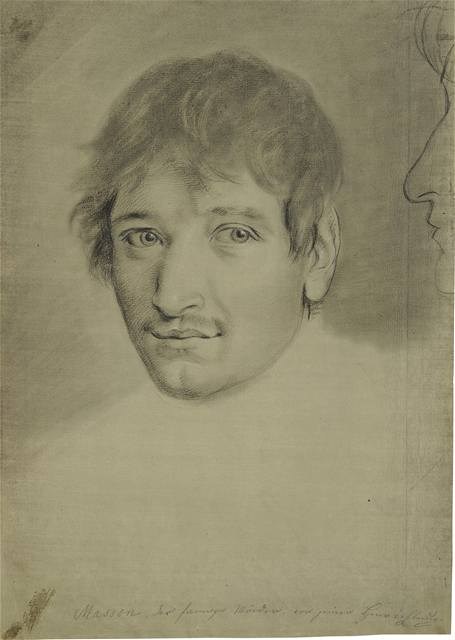
Face of the killer Masson before the execution (1816)

František Horčička (German: Franz Horcziczka; 29 June 1776 – 5 April 1856) was a Czech history and portrait painter. Along with painters Antonín Machek and František Tkadlík and sculptor Václav Prachner, he was among the first local artists to reimagine Neoclassicism using Romantic ideas.

== Life and career ==
Horčička was born in Prague on 29 June 1776. He turned to painting in the private painter's studio of Ludvík Kohl (beginning 1786) and after graduating from philosophy and law on the Charles University. In 1800 he entered new founded Academy of arts in Prague as a pupil of Josef Bergler.

He was much in demand around Prague as a portraitist of the intelligentsia. He also worked as an art restorer, notably in restoring some pieces from the gallery of Prague Castle and rich collections of paintings of the Colloredo-Mansfeld family, both in their Prague Palace and north-Bohemian castle Opočno. He made a large catalogue of their galleries.

His father-in-law was historian František Martin Pelcl. Josef Dobrovský, Bernard Bolzano or Jan Evangelista Purkyně or Adam Bittner were among his friends, he portrayed them without any idealisation. He interested in every human face: already in 1816 portrayed the killer Masson shortly before his execution his philosophical and enlightenment overview was compared with Henry Fuseli. He was considered the most important portrait painter of his day after Antonín Machek until supplanted by Jacob Ginzel in 1822.

His portraits were turned to graphics (steel engraving or lithography) by Georg Döbler or František Šír. He developed a valuable process for restoring pictures (technology of old masters oil painting using copal, encaustic).

Horčička died in Prague on 5 April 1856, aged 79.

== Works ==
- Sacral themes: Saint Wenceslaus destroying the Slavic idol Swantovit; Saint Adalbert of Prague blessing his country; Saint George and the Dragon; The Last Judgment and Holy Trinity (in the cemetery church, Prague-Košíře)
- Portraits: Mathematician Franz Anton Gerstner, Abbe Josef Dobrovsky, slavist Václav Hanka, priest and poet Ignaz Cornova, historian František Martin Pelcl, the physiologist Jan Evangelista Purkyně; the physician and mycologist Julius Vincenz von Krombholz, the Archbishop of Prague Václav Leopold Chlumčanský (1815–1830), philosopher Bernard Bolzano, Hieronym earl of Colloredo-Mansfeld.
- Miniatures: Bavarian National Museum in Munich; Hortulus Animae, and several Codices restored by Horčička: Imperial Library, Vienna; Psalter and Officium in three Folio Volumes, Vatican, Rome. According to the suspicion he participated in the forgeries of the ancient Slavic Manuscripts of epic, found in Zelená Hora and Dvůr Králové (in The Library of the National Museum in Prague).

== Bibliography ==
- Naděžda Blažíčková-Horová, ed. 19th-Century Art in Bohemia: (1790–1910) - Painting, Sculpture, Decorative Arts. Prague; National Gallery in Prague, 2009.
- "Oxford Art On Line". Oxford Grove Art. Oxford University Press.
- G. K. Nagler: Neues allgemeines Künstler-Lexicon: oder Nachrichten ..., Berlin 1838, Tome 6, p. 310
