= Horčička =

Horčička is a Czech family name. Notable people with the surname include:

- Daniel Sinapius-Horčička, Slovak baroque writer
- František Horčička (1776–1856), Czech painter
- Luboš Horčička (born 1979), Czech ice hockey goaltender
