= Bedřich Silva-Tarouca =

Czech Catholic priest

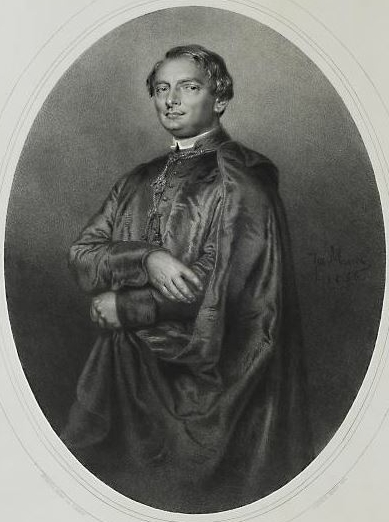
Bedřich Silva-Tarouca; portrait by Eduard Kaiser (1856)

Count Bedřich Silva-Tarouca (German: Friedrich Graf von Silva-Tarouca; 11 December 1816, Čechy pod Kosířem – 23 June 1881, Brno) was a Czech Catholic priest; descended from a noble Moravian family of Portuguese ancestry. In additional to his priestly duties, he was a journalist and a patron of the arts; involved in collecting, conservation and restoration.

== Biography ==
His great-grandfather was Emanuel Silva-Tarouca, a Portuguese nobleman who was a close friend and unofficial advisor to the Empress Maria Theresa. He was the third son of František Josef Lothar Silva-Tarouca, who was originally devoted to a military career, but resigned to join the landed gentry.

From 1834 to 1838, he studied philosophy, then spent a year studying theology at Palacký University in Olomouc. From 1841 to 1843, he continued his studies in Brno. In 1847, he renounced his inheritance in favor of his younger brother, Augustus (1818-1872). During these years, from 1835 to 1838, he also took courses in landscape painting from Professor Antonín Mánes at the Academy of Fine Arts, Prague and became acquainted with Josef Mánes, who was related to one of his mother's friends. While in Brno, he made friends with František Sušil, also a Catholic priest, who was making a collection of Moravian folk music.

=== Art collector & patron ===
As a result of these cultural influences, he devoted himself to promoting the local arts, making significant donations to the collection of the Brno Museum. He made an especially large donation in 1859, pursuant to his departure to Northern Italy, where he had volunteered to serve as a chaplain in the Austrian military hospitals during the Italian War. The donations included coins, engravings and old prints as well as paintings.

He was an active participant in the Czech and Moravian Revival Society, as well as several educational and patriotic organizations, and was a major supporter of Matice moravská, a scientific society; now part of the Czech Academy of Sciences, engaged primarily in researching Moravian history.

The Taroucov collection at the Moravian Gallery in Brno includes works by Josef Mánes, Antonín Mánes, Václav Mánes, Josef Vojtěch Hellich, Antonín Chittussi and Joseph Bergler, as well as some of his own paintings.

== Sources ==
- Václav Petera: Géniové církve a vlasti (Geniuses of the Church and Fatherland)
