= Umělecká beseda =

The Umělecká beseda (Artistis' Club Umělecká beseda) was a Czech artists' forum, bringing together creative artists in literature, music and fine art. First founded in 1863, it formed an important part of Czech cultural life in the late 19th and early 20th centuries. Under Communism in the early 1950s it fell from favor, and it was closed in 1972. It was reopened in 1990, though without the return of previously-confiscated property. The Na Prádle Theater now occupies the building that the association had purpose-built in 1925.

== Founding members ==
Bedřich Smetana – composer
Josef Manes – painter
Eduard Herold – painter and writer
Mikoláš Aleš – painter
Jan Evangelista Purkyně – scientist and artist
Karel Jaromír Erben – poet and folklorist
Vítězslav Hálek – poet
Karel Purkyně – painter
Josef Bohuslav Foerster – composer

Other members have included the painter and printmaker Jana Budíková.

== Sources ==
=== Literature ===
- V umění volnost (Kapitoly z dějin Umělecké besedy), 2003, Matys Rudolf, 356 s., Academia, Praha, ISBN 80-200-1138-2
- Umělecká beseda 1863–2003, 2003, Petrová Eva, 163 s., GHMP, Praha, ISBN 80-7010-086-9
- Padesát let Umělecké besedy 1863–1913, 1913, 320 s., vyd. Umělecká beseda, Praha, Besední 3
- Lexikon malířství a grafiky, ISBN 80-242-1576-4
