= Karel Postl =

Czech painter (1769–1818)

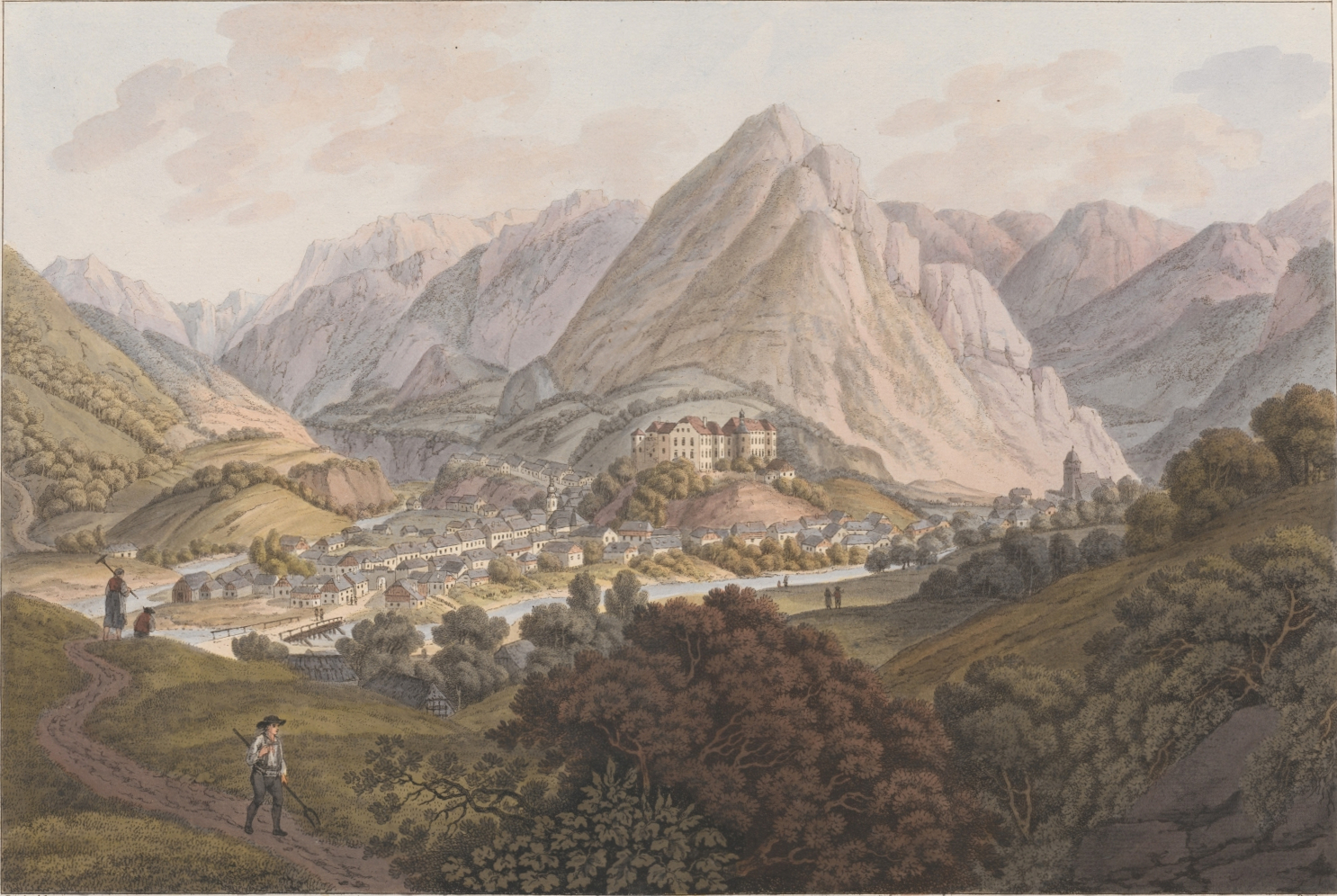
Monfalcone by Karel Postl and Ferdinand Runk, 1810

Karel Postl (German: Karl Postl; 9 November 1769 – 15 March 1818) was a Czech painter. He had a career in Prague during the early 19th century. An instructor at the Prague Academy, he also served as a scene painter for the Estates Theatre. Most of his work was in the field of graphic design, but a few paintings by his hand exist; some are in the collection of the National Gallery in Prague. Antonín Mánes was his main pupil.

== Life ==
Postl was born on 9 November 1769 into the family of a clerk of the Count Paar's Bechyně estate in Bohemia. He studied painting at the Academy of Fine Arts Vienna. From the late 18th century, he set up a studio in Prague. He was promoted as the first director of drawing at the Academy by Czech patrons, but preference was given to Josef Bergler. From 1806 to 1817, that is, until his untimely death, he taught landscape painting and graphic vista at the Academy of Fine Arts in Prague.

His students included Josef Šembera, Vincenc Morstadt and Antonín Mánes. Then from 1804, Postl worked as a theatrical scene painter at the Estates Theatre, where he was later replaced by Antonín Machek.

Postl died prematurely of tuberculosis on 15 March 1818. He is buried at the Olšany Cemetery in Prague.

== Work ==
His work blends Neoclassicism and Romanticism patterns both Viennese and French (inspired by the likes of Claude Lorrain and Nicolas Poussin). His landscape work was generally focused on panoramic views of Prague, which were often presented in graphic albums. He was also a skilled portraitist. He also participated in the creation of postcards for some spa towns. His paintings are shown primarily in the collections of the National Gallery Prague and the City of Prague Museum.

=== List of paintings ===
- New Avenues and the Church. Ursuline in Prague, 1800 (City of Prague Museum)
- Panorama of Vienna, 1804
- Panorama of Prague From Tower Waterworks
- Monastery of St. Anne Old Town
- The Game of Chase in Prague
- Royal Deer Park and Governor's Summer House, 1810 (City of Prague Museum)
- View of Český Krumlov
- Four Daytime Scapes (National Gallery)
- Forest Landscape (National Gallery)
- Portrait Postlová Wives Sewing, (National Gallery)
- Allegory of Friendship and Gratitude, shooting target, 1812 (City of Prague Museum)
