= Antonín Machek =

Czech painter (1775–1844)

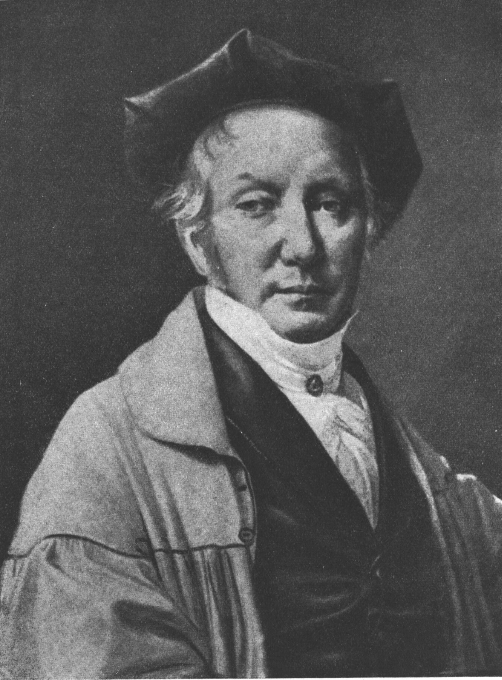
Machek's self-portrait, 1821

Antonín Machek (31 October 1775 – 18 November 1844) was a Czech painter in the Neoclassical and Biedermeier styles. He was best known for his portraits.

== Biography ==
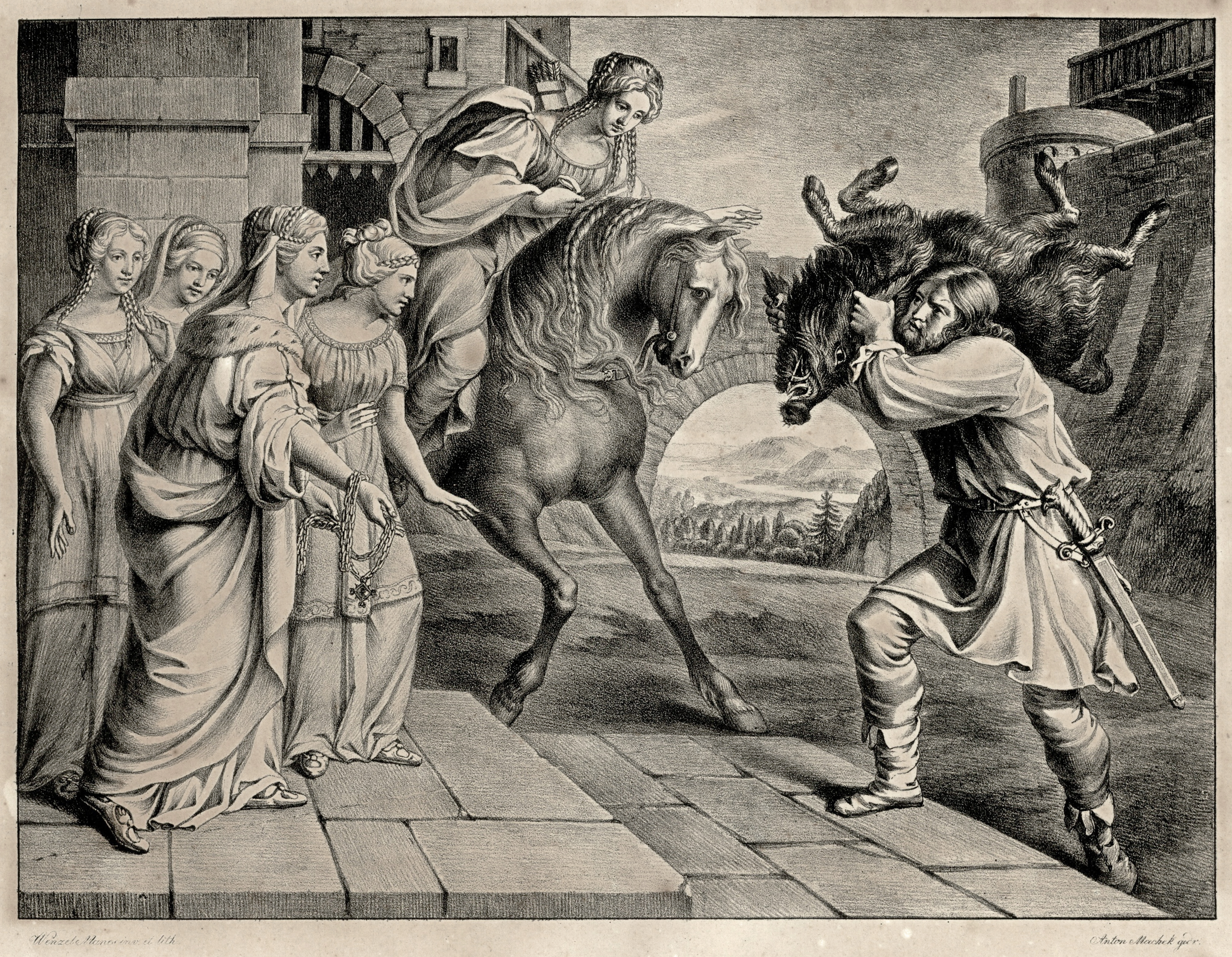
Bivoj, litography c. 1820

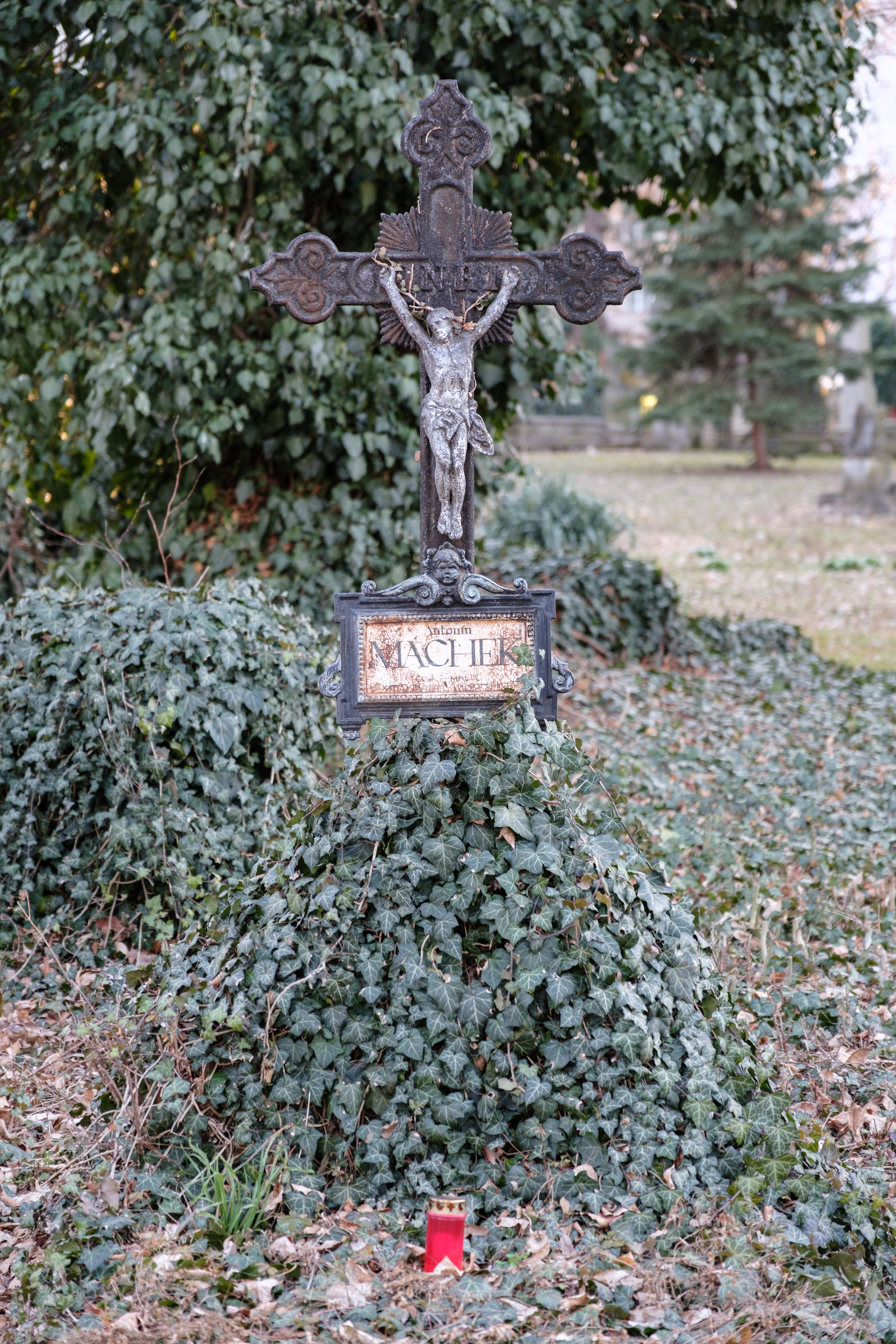
Machek's grave at Olšany Cemetery

Machek was born on 31 October 1775 in Podlažice, Kingdom of Bohemia. He was born into a family of tenant farmers. His father also worked as a tailor and, during the summers, was engaged as a musician at the nearby residence of Bishop Jan Leopold Hay, but died in 1785, when Antonín was ten.

His mother was too ill to care for him, so the local canon presented him to Bishop Hay, who took him in and apprenticed him to the court painter Wenzel Zitta, who was his instructor for two years. He travelled with the Bishop to Prague in 1790 and 1792 for the coronations of Leopold II and Francis I as the Kings of Bohemia. After the second visit, he remained there to study with Zitta's teacher, Wenzel Bluma (?–1794). The Bishop died shortly after Bluma, so he became a journeyman attached to the fresco painter and decorator Antonín Tuvora (1747–1807) and spent his evenings studying drawing with Ludvík Kohl. In 1796, he won an award at a contest sponsored by the "Society of Patriotic Friends of the Arts". After that, the new bishop, Maria Thaddäus von Trautmannsdorff, entrusted him with decorating the chapel of the castle in Chrast.

When his mother died in 1798, he sold the family home, moved to Vienna and enrolled at the Academy of Fine Arts. He ran out of money in 1801 and returned to Bohemia, settling in Hradec Králové and working as a portrait painter. A year later, he decided to be an itinerant artist, travelling through northern Austria and setting up portrait shops in Linz and Steyr. In 1813, he came to a stop in Prague, where he got married and became involved in Czech patriotic circles. He also maintained connections with the Academy of Fine Arts there, especially with Professors František Tkadlík and Joseph Bergler, who taught him lithography and other graphic techniques. In 1835, he was one of those who formally protested the overwhelmingly German content of courses at the academy and the alleged incompetence of its director.

In all, he created over 300 portraits, many of which were made into lithographs by his student, František Šír (1804–1864).

Machek died on 18 November 1844 in Prague. He is buried at the Olšany Cemetery in Prague.
