= Eduard Herold =

Czech writer and illustrator

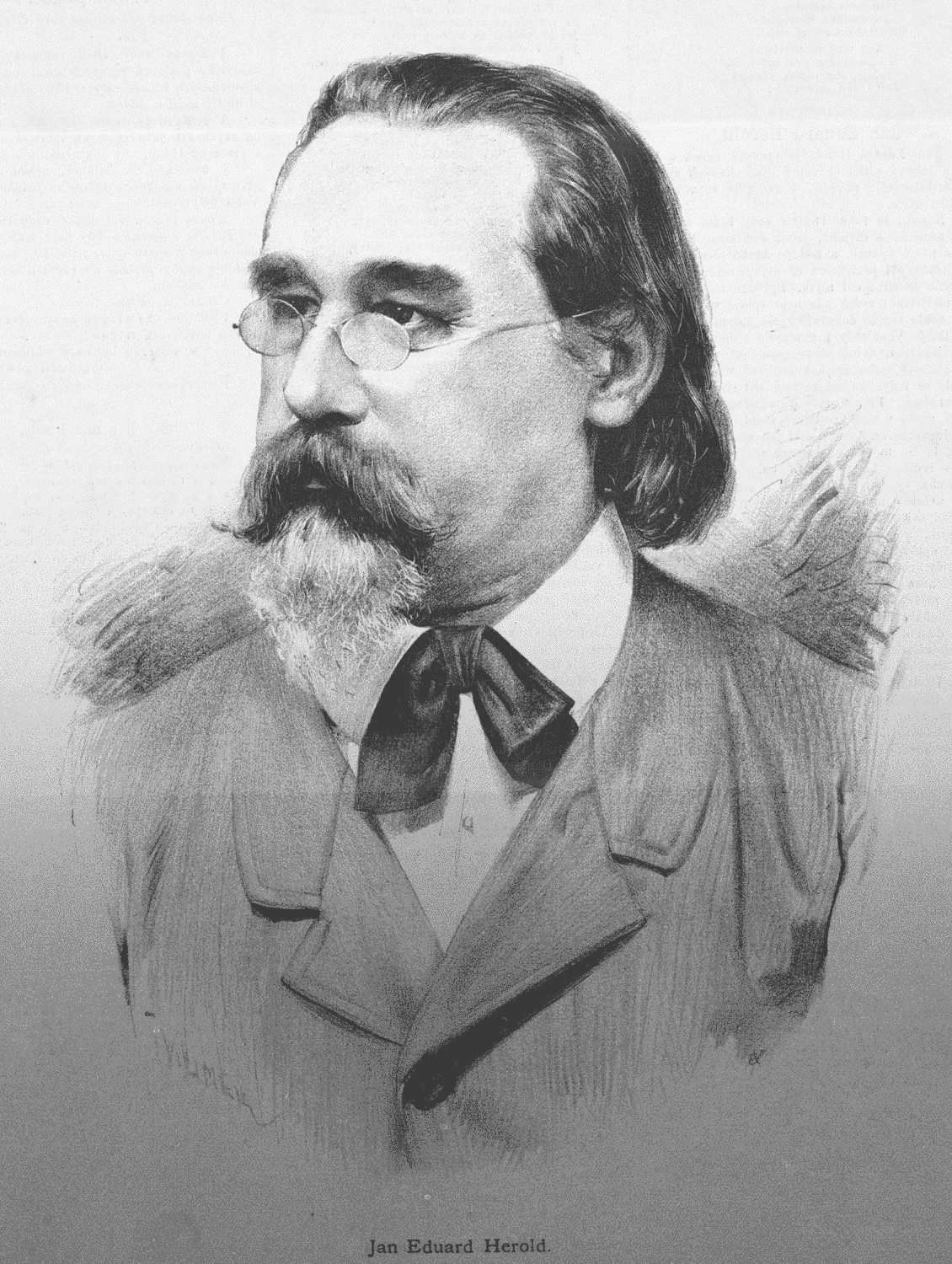
Eduard Herold; by Jan Vilímek (1885)

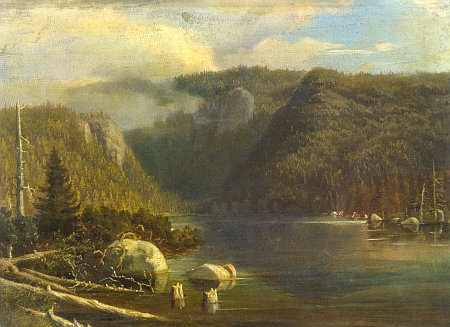
Černé jezero (Black Lake)

Jan Eduard Herold (16 September 1820 in Prague – 5 August 1895 in Prague) was a Czech painter, illustrator, art critic and writer.

== Biography ==
He was the eldest of three children born to Johann Christian Herold (?-1837), an impoverished actor in the German-language theater, and his partner, the actress Terezia Ringelmann. He initially studied at a piarist school, but did poorly, so he was apptenticed to a glovemaker, but did no better; being more interested in puppetry. In 1836, he was able to pass the entrance exam for the painting school at the Academy of Fine Arts, where he studied with František Tkadlík, Christian Ruben and Antonín Mánes, who influenced him the most.

He graduated in 1844, and became a drawing teacher for the children of aristocratic families. He eventually found a position teaching the children of Count Jindřich Chotek; living at the Count's castles in Nové Dvory and Kačina, where he stayed until 1856. While there, he made use of the castle's large library as a source for his future historical stories and illustrations.

In 1863, he became one of the founding members of Umělecká beseda, a progressive cultural association; promoting literature, music and fine art. From 1868 to 1877, he occasionally worked at the Provisional Theatre, creating stage decorations; notably for The Hussite Bride, by Karel Šebor. He also did decorative work for several amateur theater companies, including those in Jaroměř and Mladá Boleslav.

Also from 1868, he provided illustrations for numerous magazines, such as Květy, Světozor, Lumír, and Zlatá Praha. He also contributed articles on history, poetry, and short stories, as well as one novel; Čertova krčma (The Devil's Tavern, 1874).

He was married twice, to Antonia Siegel (1824–1873), and Johanna Joppová (b.1852). All three of his children died as infants. In the latter part of his life, he went back to being a drawing teacher. He died in 1895 and was interred at Olšany Cemetery.
