= Čechy pod Kosířem =

- Municipality
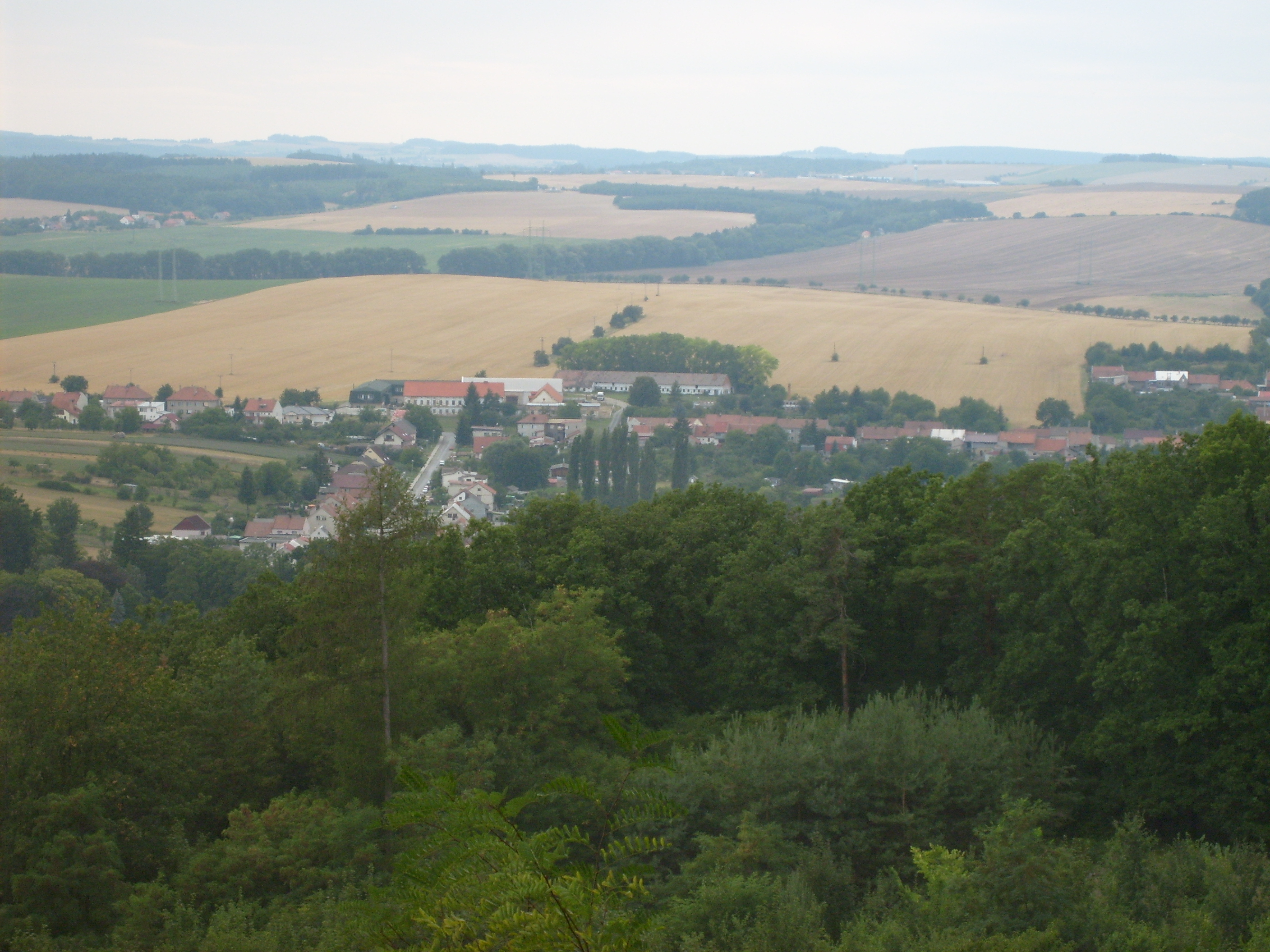
- View of Čechy pod Kosířem

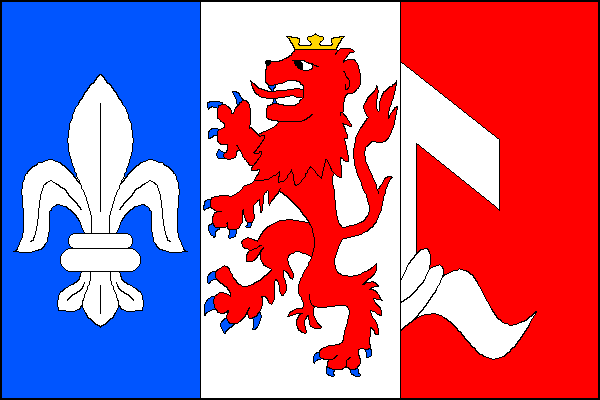
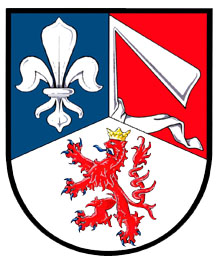
- Flag Coat of arms

- Location in the Czech Republic
- Coordinates: 49°33′4″N 17°2′16″E
- Country: Czech Republic
- Region: Olomouc
- District: Prostějov
- First mentioned: 1141

Area
  - Total: 9.20 km^{2} (3.55 sq mi)
- Elevation: 275 m (902 ft)

Population (2026-01-01)
  - Total: 1,135
  - Density: 123/km^{2} (320/sq mi)
- Time zone: UTC+1 (CET)
  - Summer (DST): UTC+2 (CEST)
- Postal code: 798 58
- Website: www.cechypk.cz

Čechy pod Kosířem is a municipality and village in Prostějov District in the Olomouc Region of the Czech Republic. It has about 1,100 inhabitants.

== Geography ==
Čechy pod Kosířem is located about 10 kilometres (6 mi) northwest of Prostějov and 15 km (9 mi) west of Olomouc. It lies in the Zábřeh Highlands. The highest point is a contour line on the hill Velký Kosíř at 432 m (1,417 ft). The village is situated at the foot of this hill.

== History ==
The first written mention of Čechy pod Kosířem is in a deed of Bishop Jindřich Zdík from 1141. The most notable owners were the Silva-Tarouca noble family, which owned the estate with the castle from 1768 until 1945.

== Demographics ==
Historical population

Year	Pop.	±%
1869	1,018	—
1880	1,049	+3.0%
1890	1,118	+6.6%
1900	1,375	+23.0%
1910	1,213	−11.8%

Year	Pop.	±%
1921	1,144	−5.7%
1930	1,261	+10.2%
1950	1,273	+1.0%
1961	1,188	−6.7%
1970	1,075	−9.5%

Year	Pop.	±%
1980	990	−7.9%
1991	919	−7.2%
2001	929	+1.1%
2011	1,022	+10.0%
2021	1,003	−1.9%

Source: Censuses

== Transport ==
There are no railways or major roads passing through the municipal territory.

== Sights ==
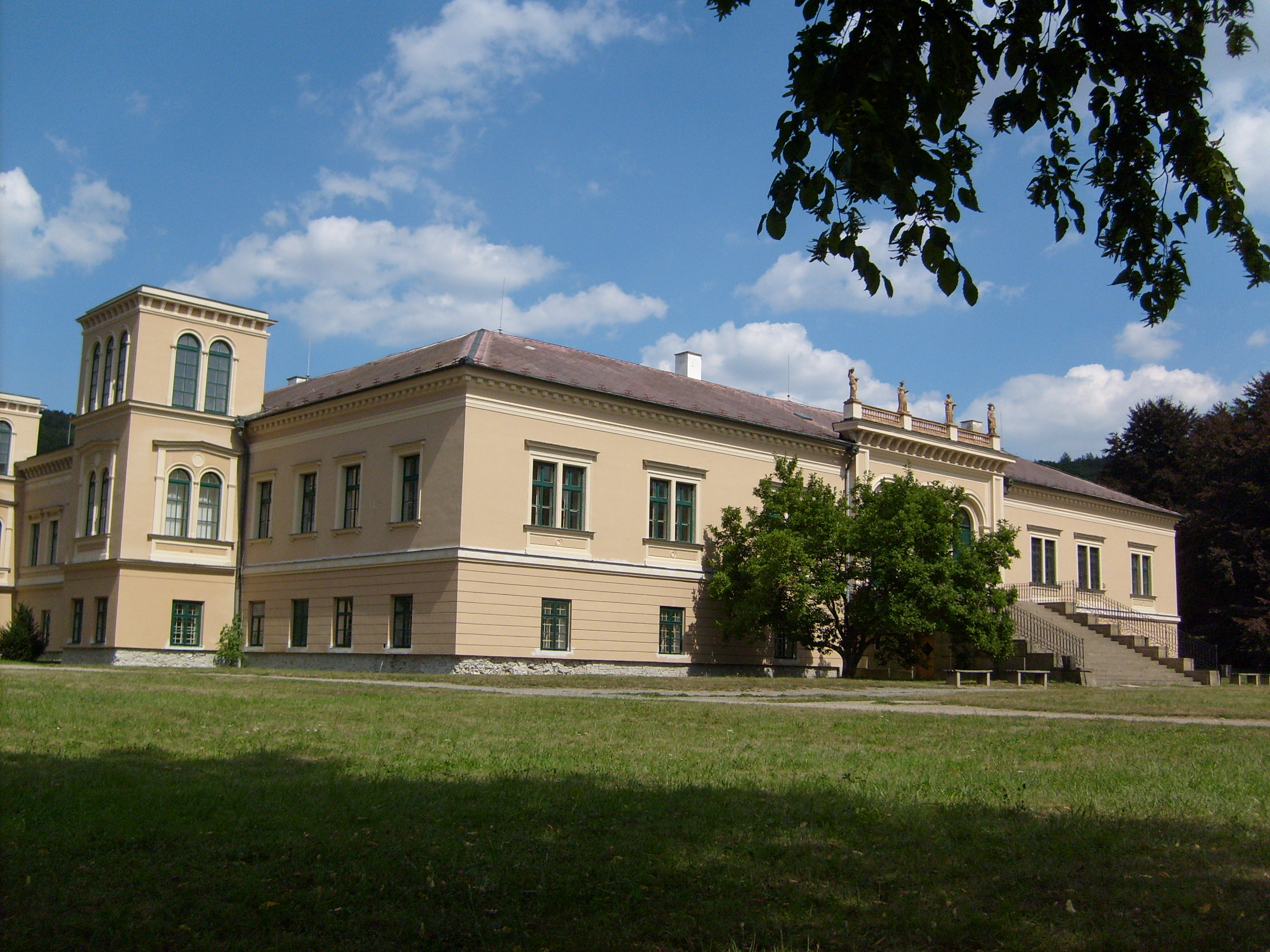
Čechy pod Kosířem Castle

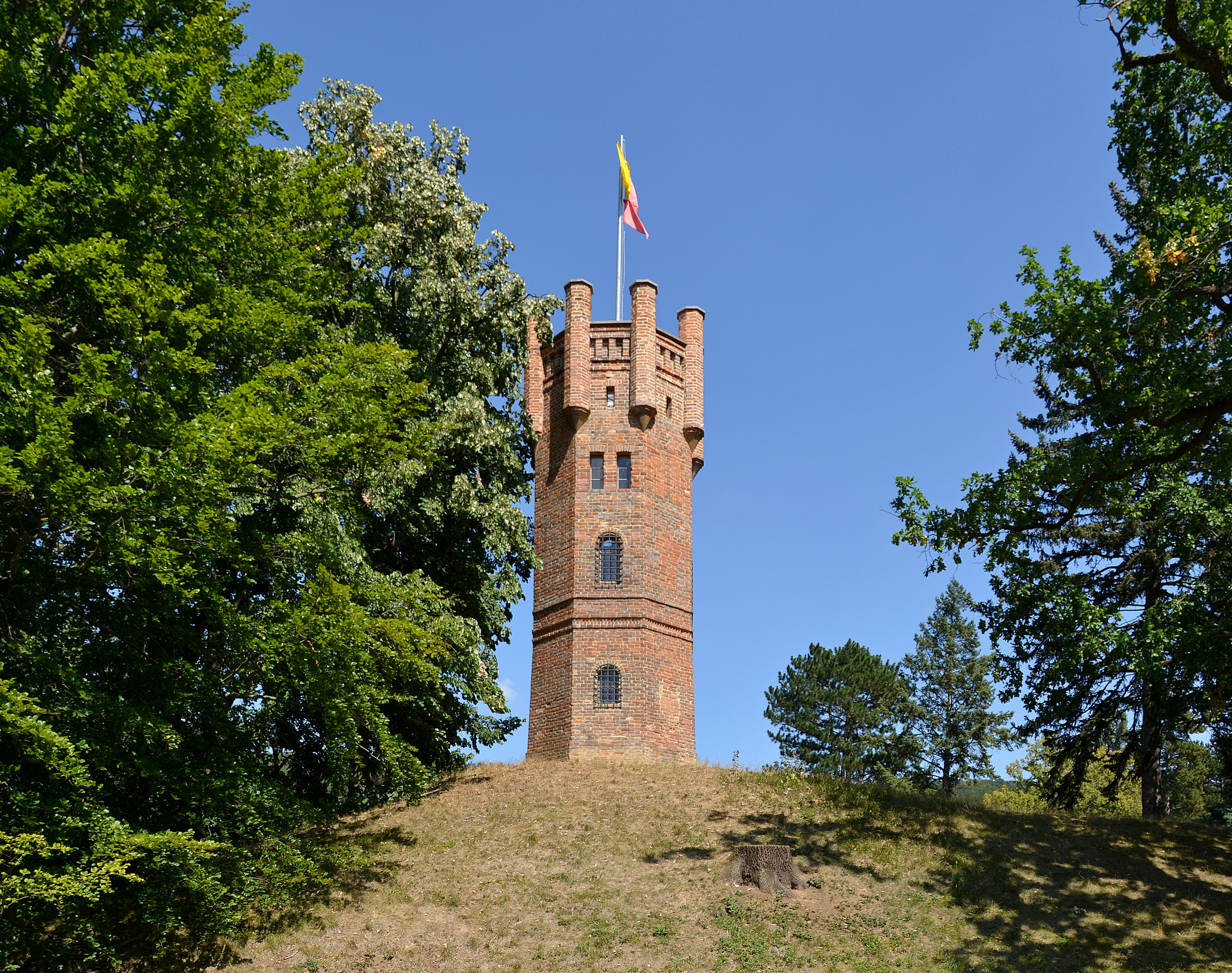
Lookout tower in the castle park

The municipality is known for the Čechy pod Kosířem Castle. The original castle was built here in the 16th century. After it fell into disrepair, it was reconstructed in the 1820s. In 1839–1846, it was rebuilt into its current appearance in the Neoclassical, so-called "modernised Italian" style. Today there are several exhibitions of the Regional Museum in Olomouc.

Even more important than the castle building is the castle park. It was founded in the 1820–1830s. It was adapted as a landscape area with a network of canals, footpaths and small architectural structures. Later, a brick tower with a battlement and a garden pavilion were added. The pavilion served the painter Josef Mánes as a studio, which visited the castle for more than twenty years and created his masterpieces. At the time of August Alexander Silva-Tarouca, today's terrain modeling of the park was created, including two ponds, and in 1853 an orangery was built next to the castle.

The Church of Saint John the Baptist is among the main landmarks of the town. It was built in the Baroque style in 1794. In front of the church are valuable statues of Saints Peter and Paul.

== Notable people ==
- Bedřich Silva-Tarouca (1816–1881), Catholic priest and nobleman
- Josef Mánes (1820–1871), painter; worked here
- Hugo Schenk (1849–1884), Austrian serial killer
