= Václav Mánes =

Czech painter (1793–1858)

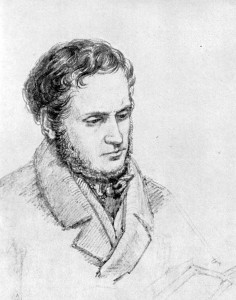
Portrait of Václav Mánes by Josef Mánes (1838)

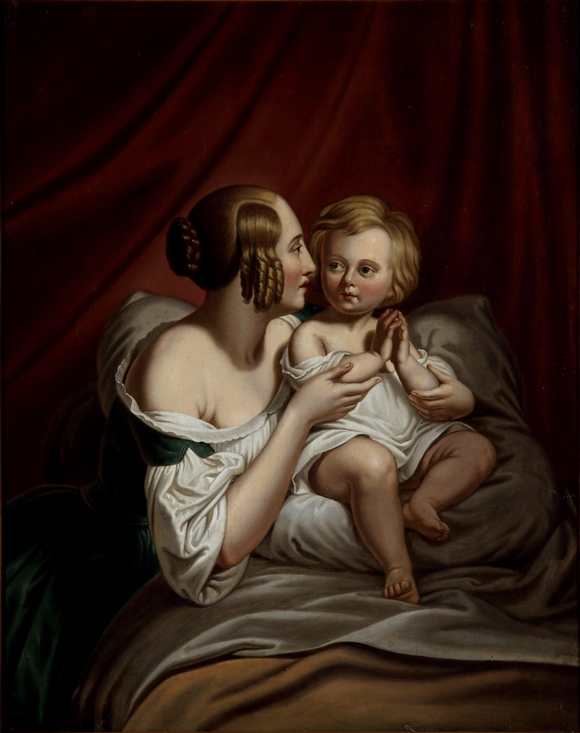
Lady with Child

Václav Mánes (1793 – 31 January 1858) was a Czech painter. He was the brother of Antonín Mánes and uncle of Quido and Josef Mánes and Amalie Mánesová, all of whom were also painters. He never married and lived and worked in Antonín's household for the duration of his career.

== Life and work ==
Mánes was born in 1793 in Prague. He initially studied at a piarist school. Later, he was enrolled at the Academy of Fine Arts, where he studied with Joseph Bergler. In 1829, he was awarded the Klárovo Scholarship and spent the next three years living and working in Rome, where his chief companions were members of the Nazarenes.

Stylistically, his work hovered somewhere between Neoclassicism and Romanticism. He served as interim director of the Prague Academy from 1835 to 1836 and again in 1840. He won some acclaim for his depictions of scenes from the Bible, and painted portraits as well. After 1835, he was also a member of "Krasoumná jednota" (lit. 'beautiful art unity'), a society for promoting the fine arts. He died in Prague.

His works may be seen at the National Gallery Prague, the City of Prague Museum and the National Museum.
