= Johann Rudolf Czernin von und zu Chudenitz =

Austrian civil servant (1757–1845)

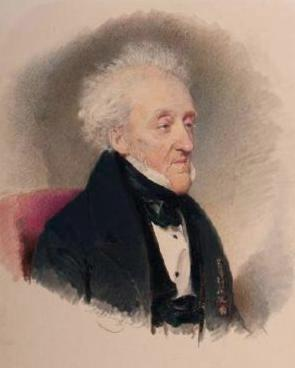
Portrait of Czernin by Moritz Michael Daffinger (c. 1840)

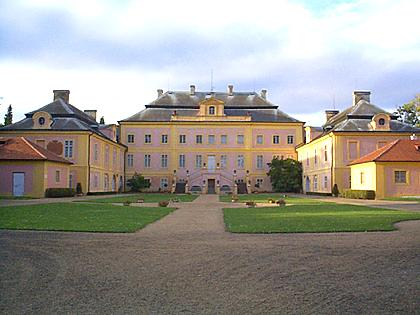
Krásný Dvůr Castle

Johann Rudolf Graf Czernin von und zu Chudenitz (c. 9 June 1757 – c. 23 April 1845) was an Austrian Empire civil servant and theatre director. He descended from the old Bohemian noble family Czernin von und zu Chudenitz. He was the son of Count Prokop Adalbert Czernin, who offered Mozart in 1776 a one year's rent, provided he would write some compositions for the Count's orchestra. His sister was Countess Antonie von Lützow. His mother was Countess Antonie von Colloredo, the sister of Archbishop Colloredo, thus the Count was a nephew of the Salzburg Archbishop.

== Life ==
Czernin was born or baptised on 9 June 1757 in Vienna. He went to school in Salzburg, where his uncle, Count Hieronymus von Colloredo, was the bishop. The young Czernin and certainly his sister were in connection with Wolfgang Amadeus Mozart (and almost the same age), who wrote a violin and piano concerto for them. Countess Antonia Lützow, 25 years old, was a fine pianist and Mozart composed a piano concerto (K. 246) for her in 1776. Count Johann Rudolph Czernin was an aspiring violinist. In 1778 he founded an orchestra, which played on Sunday afternoons at the Lodron family. Leopold Mozart sent Wolfgang, then in Paris, an amusing account of its first meeting, at which both Leopold and Mozart's sister, Nannerl, played. Leopold wrote of Czernin's limited achievements as an indefatigable violin player.

In 1781 Czernin married Theresa Schönborn and traveled with her to Italy, Switzerland, France, Belgium, Holland, and England, and became interested in the new fashion of the English landscape garden. At the end of the 18th century, Czernin made the Jemčina Castle very famous. In the presence of representatives of the Bohemian and Austrian aristocracy famous cursorial hunting parties were held here, and scholars and scientists from the Bohemian National Patriotic Movement were invited as guests.

In 1810 Johann Wolfgang von Goethe was invited to Krásný Dvůr Castle, the family estates, near Karlsbad. In the meantime, Czernin began to accumulate paintings and drawings and had, twenty years later, the most important collection of the Austrian Empire. In 1813 he bought The Art of Painting, a celebrated work by Johannes Vermeer, from the estate of Gottfried van Swieten (at the time, it was not known that the work was by Vermeer). From 1817 until 1825, František Tkadlík was the court painter for the Czernin family and appointed as the guard of their art gallery in Vienna.

In 1823, Czernin was appointed president of the Academy of Fine Arts Vienna. This office he held until 1827. As early as 1823, he was appointed by the Emperor Francis II. He was entrusted with the leadership of the imperial collections of the Court; the old Burgtheater was also under his direction. He also founded the Society of the Patriotic Museums.

Johann Rudolf Czernin, Count von und zu Chudenitz died in Vienna at the age of 88. He died or was buried on 23 April 1845. His private art collection at his death consisted of nearly 2,000 engravings, which laid the foundation of the Czernin Collection. Parts of this collection can still be seen in the Residenzgalerie in Salzburg.
