= Piano Concerto No. 8 (Mozart) =

1776 composition by W. A. Mozart

- Lützow
- by W. A. Mozart
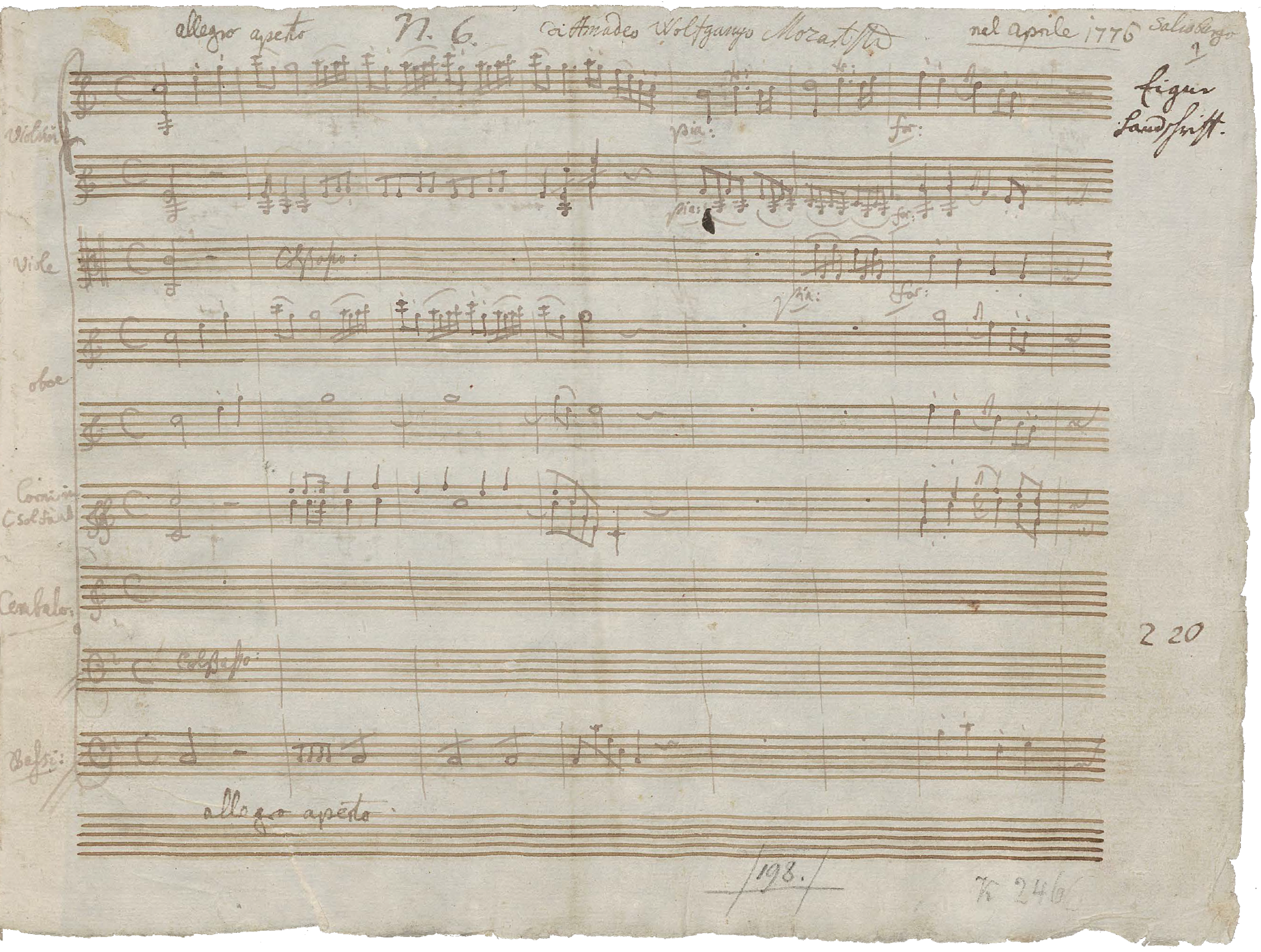
- first page
- Key: C major
- Catalogue: K. 246
- Composed: 1776
- Movements: Three (Allegro, Andante, Rondeau. Tempo di Minuetto)
- Scoring: Piano; orchestra

Premiere
- Date: 4 October 1777
- Performers: Wolfgang Amadeus Mozart

The Piano Concerto No. 8 in C major, K. 246, nicknamed "Lützow Concert", was written by Wolfgang Amadeus Mozart in April 1776 in the same year as the Haffner Serenade (K. 250).

== Composition ==
Countess Antonia Lützow, who was 25 or 26 years old at the time, was the second wife of Johann Nepomuk Gottfried Graf Lützow, the Commander of the Hohensalzburg Fortress. Suitable as a work for beginners, the solo work is not highly demanding, but it requires agility. Mozart played the concerto on his journey to Paris in Munich on 4 October 1777 and later in Mannheim, and used it for teaching. Three cadenzas by Mozart have survived. Kitano concludes that the first two cadenzas, A and B in the Urtext edition, may have been written for the Countess Lützow herself to accommodate her limited technical ability, while cadenza C more resembles what Mozart might have played when he performed the work in Augsburg in 1777.

It is suggested Mozart also wrote a violin concerto for Countess Lützow's brother Johann Rudolph Czernin (and almost the same age as Mozart). Johann Rudolf, his sister, and their father were in connection with Mozart at that time, while Mozart was in service of their uncle, Count Hieronymus von Colloredo.

== Structure ==
The concerto is scored for two oboes, two horns, solo piano, and string section. It consists of three movements:

1. Allegro aperto
2. Andante in F major
3. Rondeau. Tempo di Menuetto
