= Amalie Mánesová =

Czech artist (1817–1883)

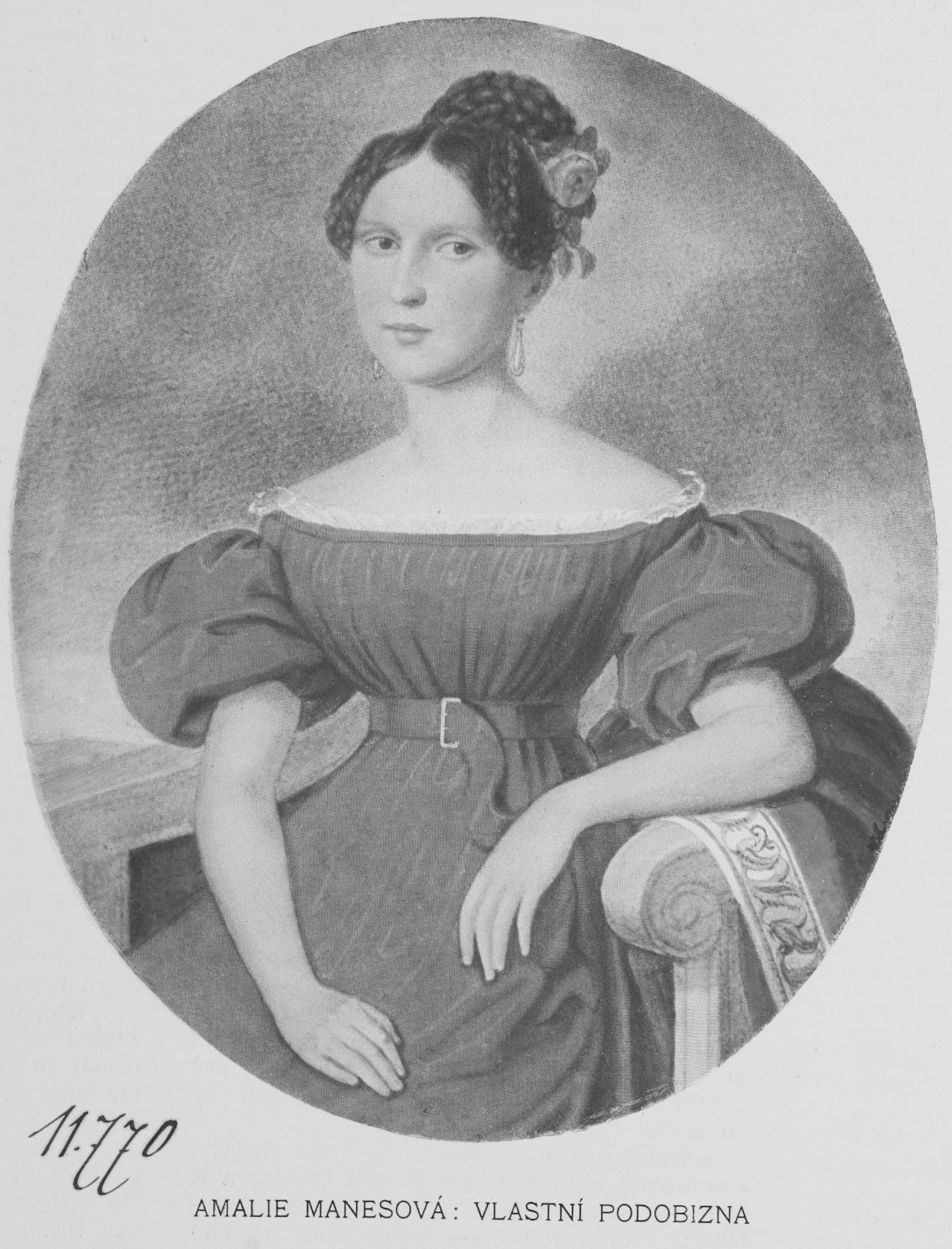
Self-portrait (1837)

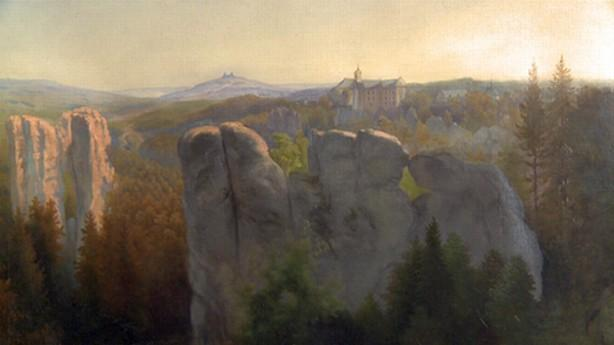
View of Hrubá Skála

Amalie Mánesová (21 January 1817 – 4 July 1883) was a Czech landscape painter.

== Biography ==
Mánesová was born in Prague on 17 21 January 1817. She came from an artistic family. Her father, Antonín Mánes, brothers Josef and Quido, and uncle Václav were all painters. Although she wanted to specialize in portraits, her father believed it was inappropriate for a woman to do so and insisted that she do landscapes instead.

When Mánes became ill in 1866, Mánesová took him to Rome for his health, then back to Prague, where she cared for him until his death in 1871. During this time, she turned down an offer of marriage from Václav Levý.

Mánesová died suddenly from heart disease. Most of her works are owned by the descendants of her pupils, although some of her work may be seen in the collections of the National Gallery in Prague.

She died in Prague on 4 July 1883.
