= Chrast =

- Town
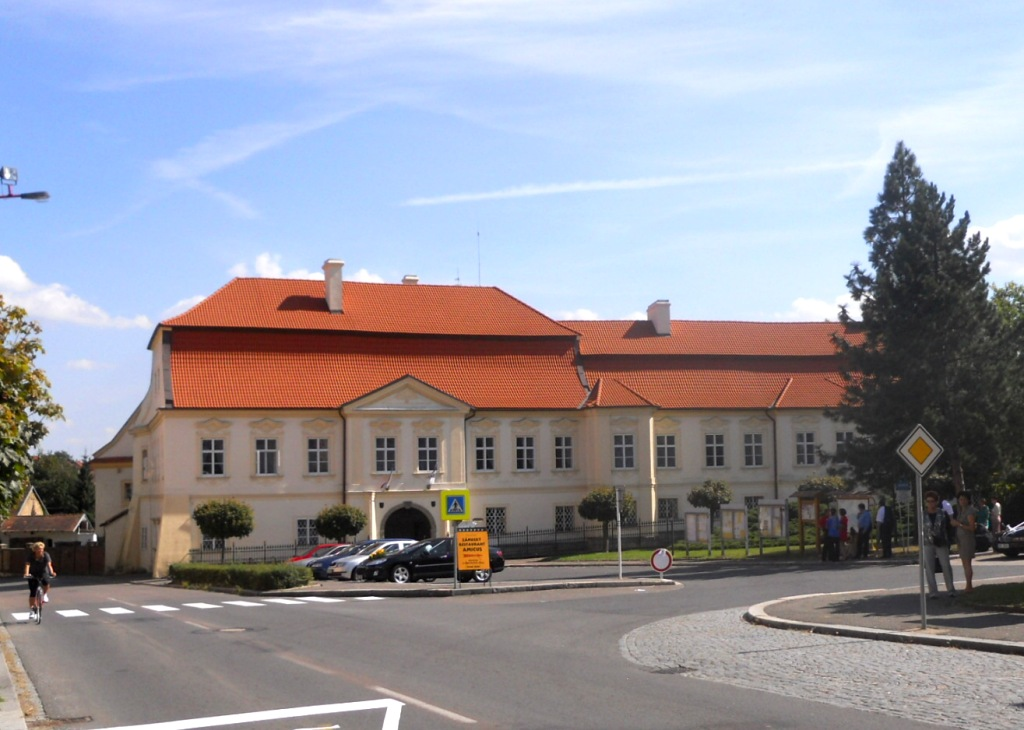
- Chrast Castle

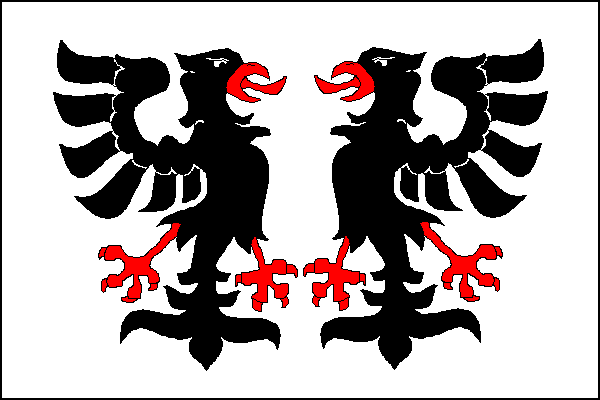
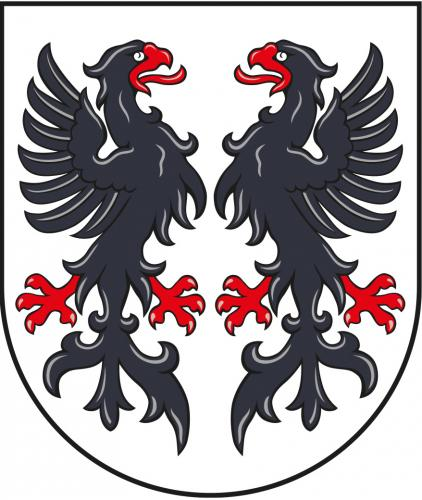
- Flag Coat of arms

- Location in the Czech Republic
- Coordinates: 49°54′8″N 15°56′2″E
- Country: Czech Republic
- Region: Pardubice
- District: Chrudim
- First mentioned: 1318

Government
  - Mayor: Vojtěch Krňanský

Area
  - Total: 17.84 km^{2} (6.89 sq mi)
- Elevation: 285 m (935 ft)

Population (2026-01-01)
  - Total: 3,181
  - Density: 178.3/km^{2} (461.8/sq mi)
- Time zone: UTC+1 (CET)
  - Summer (DST): UTC+2 (CEST)
- Postal code: 538 51
- Website: www.mestochrast.cz

Chrast (Czech pronunciation: [ˈxrast]) is a town in Chrudim District in the Pardubice Region of the Czech Republic. It has about 3,200 inhabitants. The town is located on the Žejbro Stream in the Svitavy Uplands.

Chrast was founded in the second half of the 13th century and became a town in 1853. The historic centre with the castle complex is well preserved and is protected as an urban monument zone.

== Administrative division ==
Chrast consists of four municipal parts (in brackets population according to the 2021 census):

- Chrast (2,460)
- Chacholice (241)
- Podlažice (319)
- Skála (74)

== Etymology ==
The name Chrást is a common Czech place name, meaning 'brushwood' or 'shrubs'. In this region, the word was written as chrast, therefore, the form of the town's name differs.

== Geography ==
Chrast is located about 11 kilometres (7 mi) southeast of Chrudim and 18 km (11 mi) southeast of Pardubice. It lies in the Svitavy Uplands. The highest point is the elevated plain of Kostecká hůra at 432 m (1,417 ft) above sea level. The town is situated on the right bank of the Žejbro Stream. The fishpond Horecký rybník is located south of the town.

The slope on the right bank of the stream is protected as the Chrašická stráň Nature Monument.

== History ==
The oldest part of Chrast is Podlažice. The Benedictine monastery in Podlažice was founded in 1159. The monastery is where the Codex Gigas (or "Devil's Bible") was produced. It remains the largest extant medieval manuscript. However, it is unlikely that the book was written at the monastery due to its small size and meagre funds.

The first written mention of Chrast is from 1318. It was founded in the second half of the 13th century by monks from the Podlažice Monastery. The monastery was destroyed by the Hussites in 1421.

In 1539, Chrast was acquired by the noble Slavata of Chlum and the Košumberk family. In the early 17th century, Albrecht Slavata had built a castle here. In 1664, Chrast was bought by Hradec Králové Bishopric. The castle served as the summer residence of several bishops. In the 18th century, it was rebuilt and extended. In 1853, Chrast was promoted to a town.

== Demographics ==
Historical population

Year	Pop.	±%
1869	2,947	—
1880	2,997	+1.7%
1890	3,038	+1.4%
1900	3,268	+7.6%
1910	3,657	+11.9%

Year	Pop.	±%
1921	3,593	−1.8%
1930	3,523	−1.9%
1950	2,986	−15.2%
1961	3,251	+8.9%
1970	3,239	−0.4%

Year	Pop.	±%
1980	3,314	+2.3%
1991	3,237	−2.3%
2001	3,223	−0.4%
2011	3,064	−4.9%
2021	3,094	+1.0%

Source: Censuses

== Transport ==
Chrast is located on the railway line Pardubice–Havlíčkův Brod.

== Sights ==
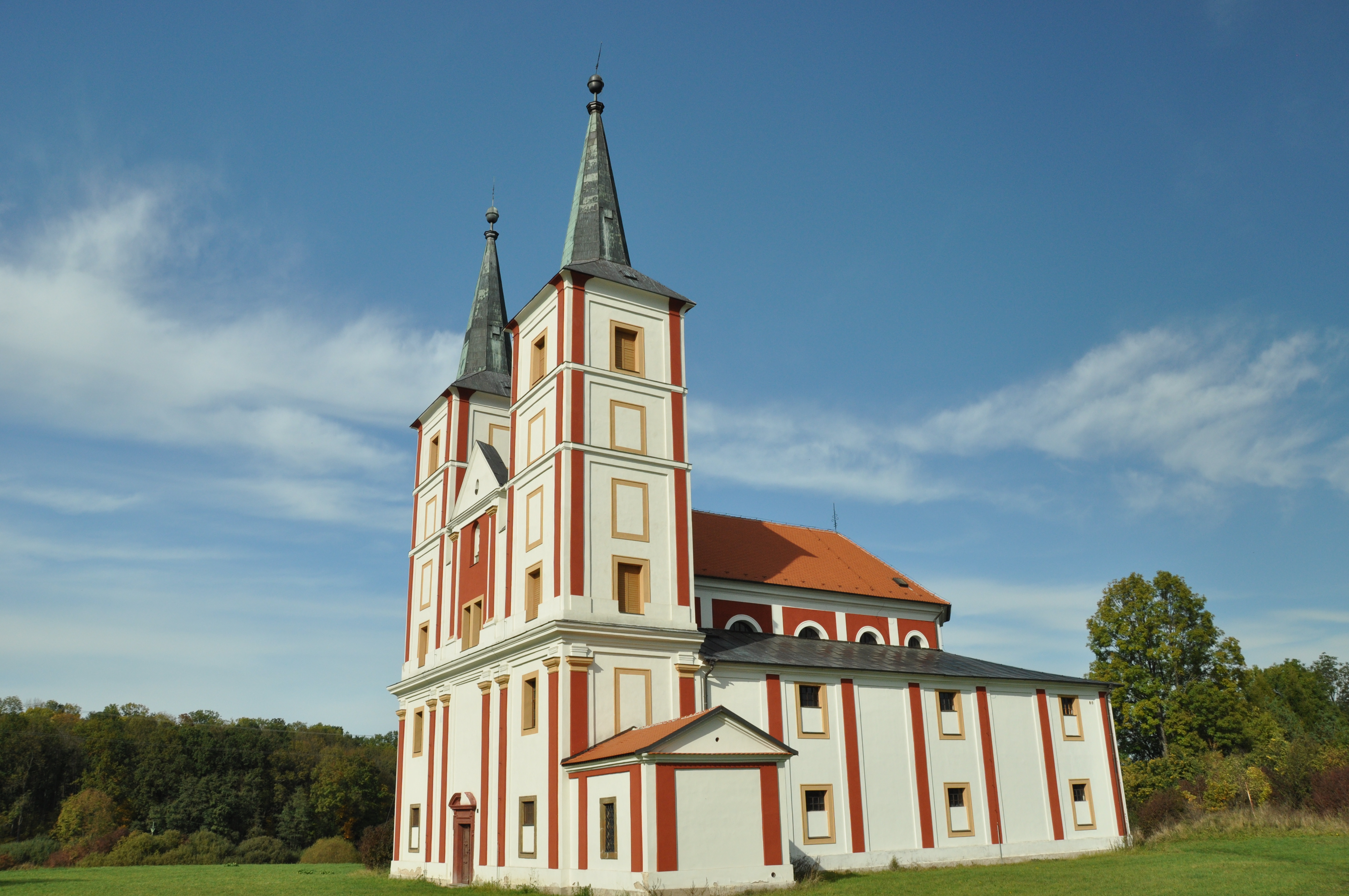
Church of Saint Margaret the Virgin on the site of the former monastery

The Baroque castle now houses the Town Museum, which was founded in 1893. The former castle chapel is today a concert hall. The adjacent castle garden was created in 1903.

The main landmark of the town square is the Church of the Holy Trinity. It was built in 1612–1618 by renewal of an old church and reconstructed to its current form in 1774. The oldest church in the town is the Church of Saint Martin. It is a cemetery church, built in 1350. The Church of Saint Margaret the Virgin in Podlažice and the Church of Saint John the Baptist in Skála were both founded in 1696.

== Notable people ==
- Johann Leopold Hay (1735–1794), Bishop of Hradec Králové; died here
- Antonín Machek (1775–1844), painter
- Ludwig August Frankl von Hochwart (1810–1894), Czech-Austrian writer and poet
- Martin Dejdar (born 1965), actor
