= Vojtěch Krňanský =

Czech politician (born 1989)

Member of the Chamber of Deputies
- Incumbent
- Assumed office 4 October 2025
- Constituency: Pardubice Region

Personal details
- Born: 1 January 1989 (age 37) Pardubice, Czechoslovakia
- Party: ANO (2018–2021); Independent (nominated by Motorists for Themselves) (2025–)
- Education: Panevropská univerzita

Vojtěch Krňanský (born 1 January 1989) is a Czech politician serving as a member of the Chamber of Deputies for Motorists for Themselves since 2025. He has served as mayor of Chrast since 2018.
