= Mánes Bridge =

Mánes Bridge Mánesův most
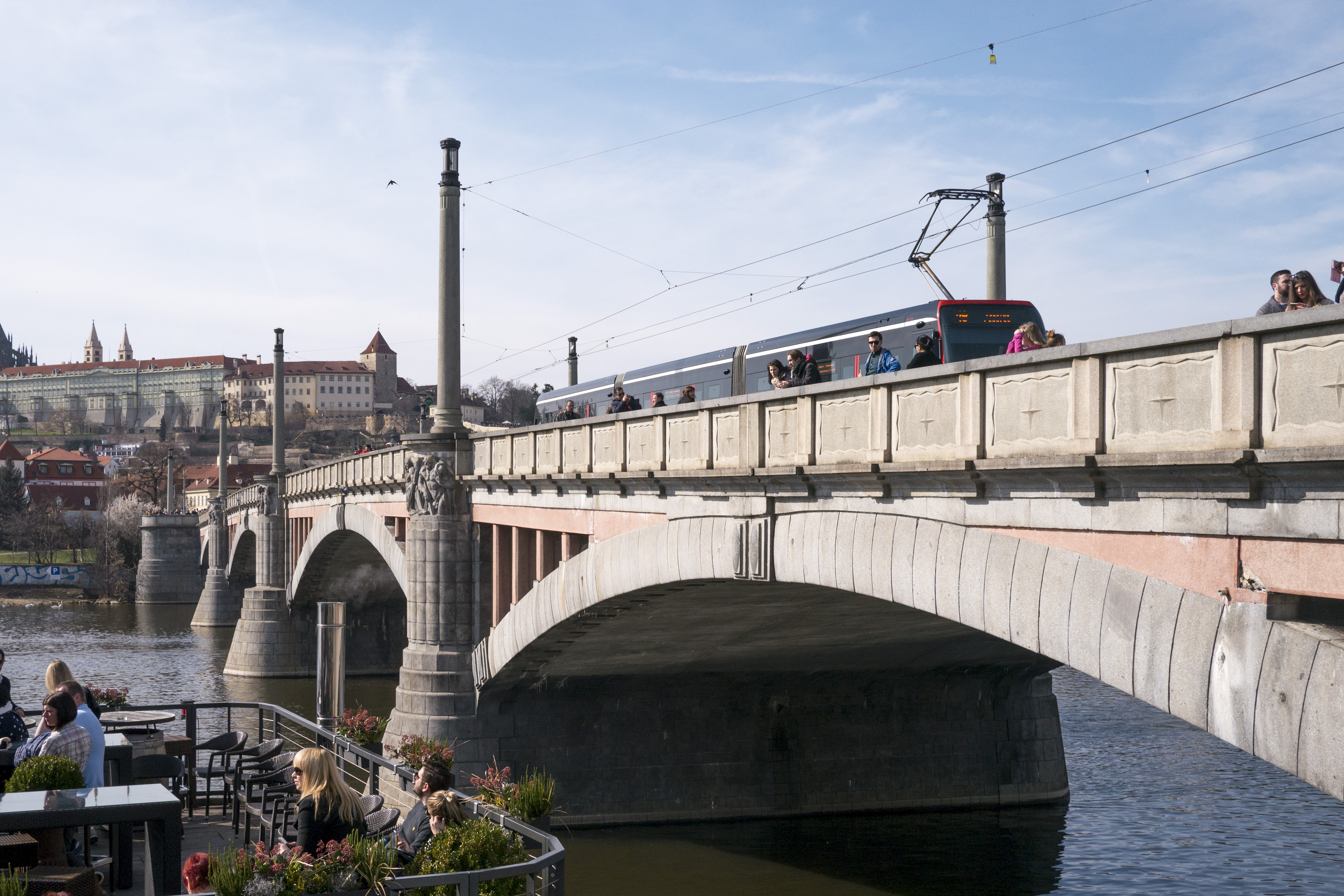
- The bridge in 2016
- Coordinates: 50°05′22″N 14°24′46″E
- Crosses: River Vltava
- Locale: Prague, The Czech Republic
- Named for: Josef Mánes

Characteristics
- Material: Concrete, reinforced concrete, granite blocks
- Total length: 186m
- Width: 16m

History
- Architect: Mečislav Petrů
- Designer: František Mencl and Alois Nový
- Constructed by: Kress and Bernard, Pražská společnost pro stavby, Müller and Kapsa
- Construction end: 1916

Location
- Interactive map of Mánes Bridge

Mánes Bridge (Czech: Mánesův most) is a road and tramway bridge over the Vltava river in Prague, Czech Republic. It connects the Aleš Embankment and Rudolfinum to the Lesser Quarter (Malá Strana) and replaced the previous Rudolf footbridge built in 1869. The bridge is named after the Czech painter Josef Mánes.

The new bridge was designed by architect Mečislav Petrů and engineers František Mencl and Alois Nový. Built of concrete and supported on four segmental arches, the bridge was opened in 1914 but not fully completed until 1916. Originally named the Archduke Bridge by Archduke Franz Ferdinand of Austria, it was renamed Mánes Bridge in 1920. In the 1960s the original mosaic pavements were replaced by asphalt. However, the asphalting caused various problems, and it was removed during reconstruction work between 1992 and 1994.
