= Quido Mánes =

Czech painter (1828–1880)

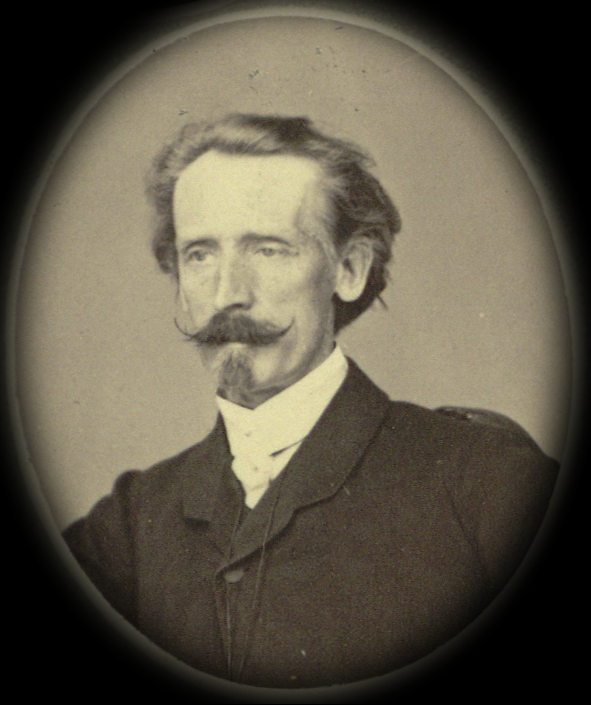
Quido Mánes (c. 1867)

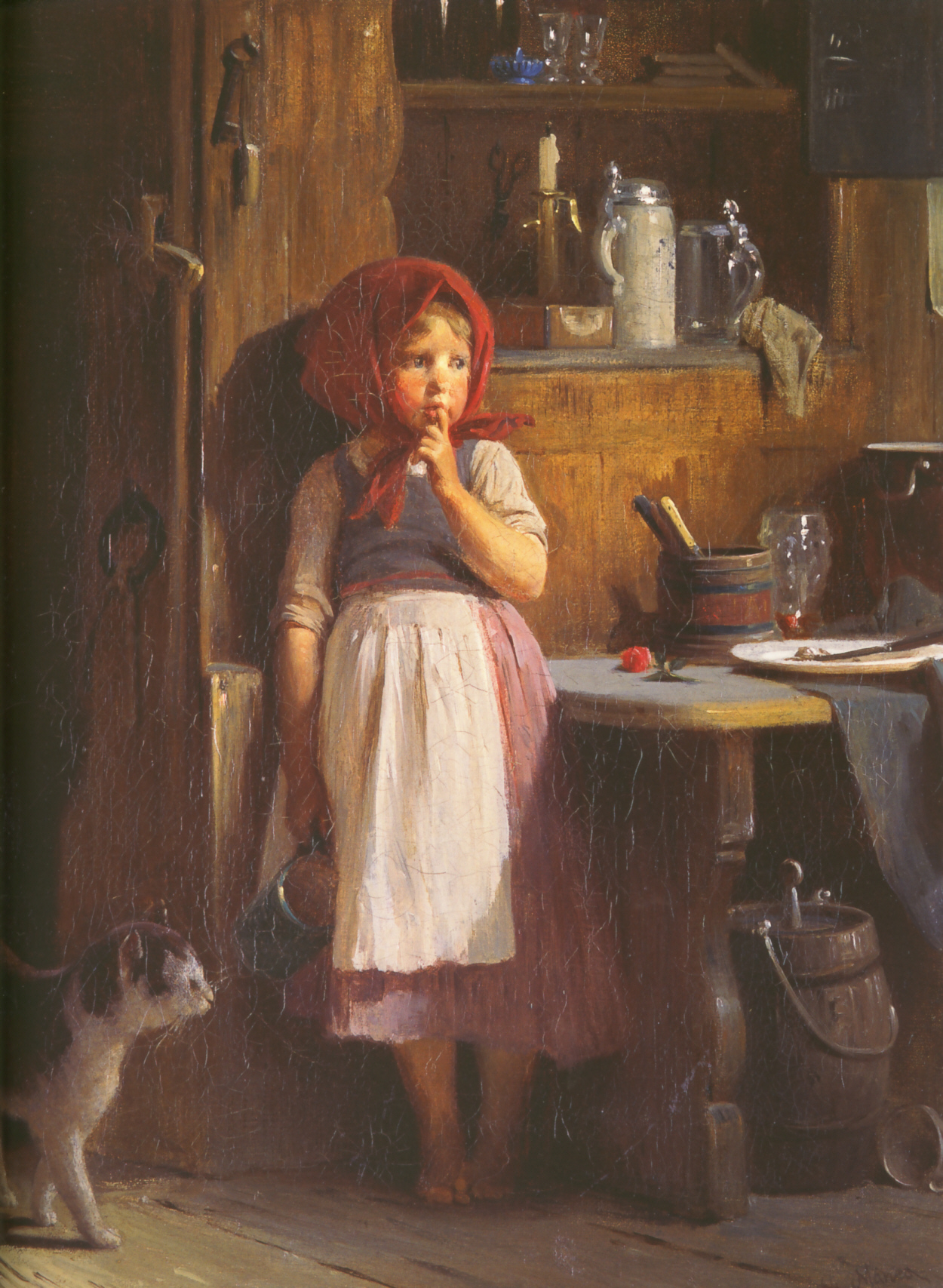
Young Girl (c. 1860)

Quido Mánes (17 July 1828 – 5 August 1880) was a Czech painter who specialized in genre scenes.

== Life and work ==
Mánes was born in Prague on 17 July 1828. He came from a family of artists that included his father Antonín, uncle Vaclav, brother Josef and sister Amalie. From 1838 to 1851 he studied at the Academy of Fine Arts, Prague. His career was interrupted for several years after 1866 by Josef's severe illness. In 1871, following his brother's death, he refreshed his skills by taking further lessons from Benjamin Vautier at the Kunstakademie Düsseldorf.

He was best known for his scenes of everyday bourgeois life in Prague and folk scenes from Chodenland in southwest Bohemia. His portraits of children were especially popular.

He died in Prague on 5 August 1880.
