= Karel Javůrek =

Czech painter (1815–1909)

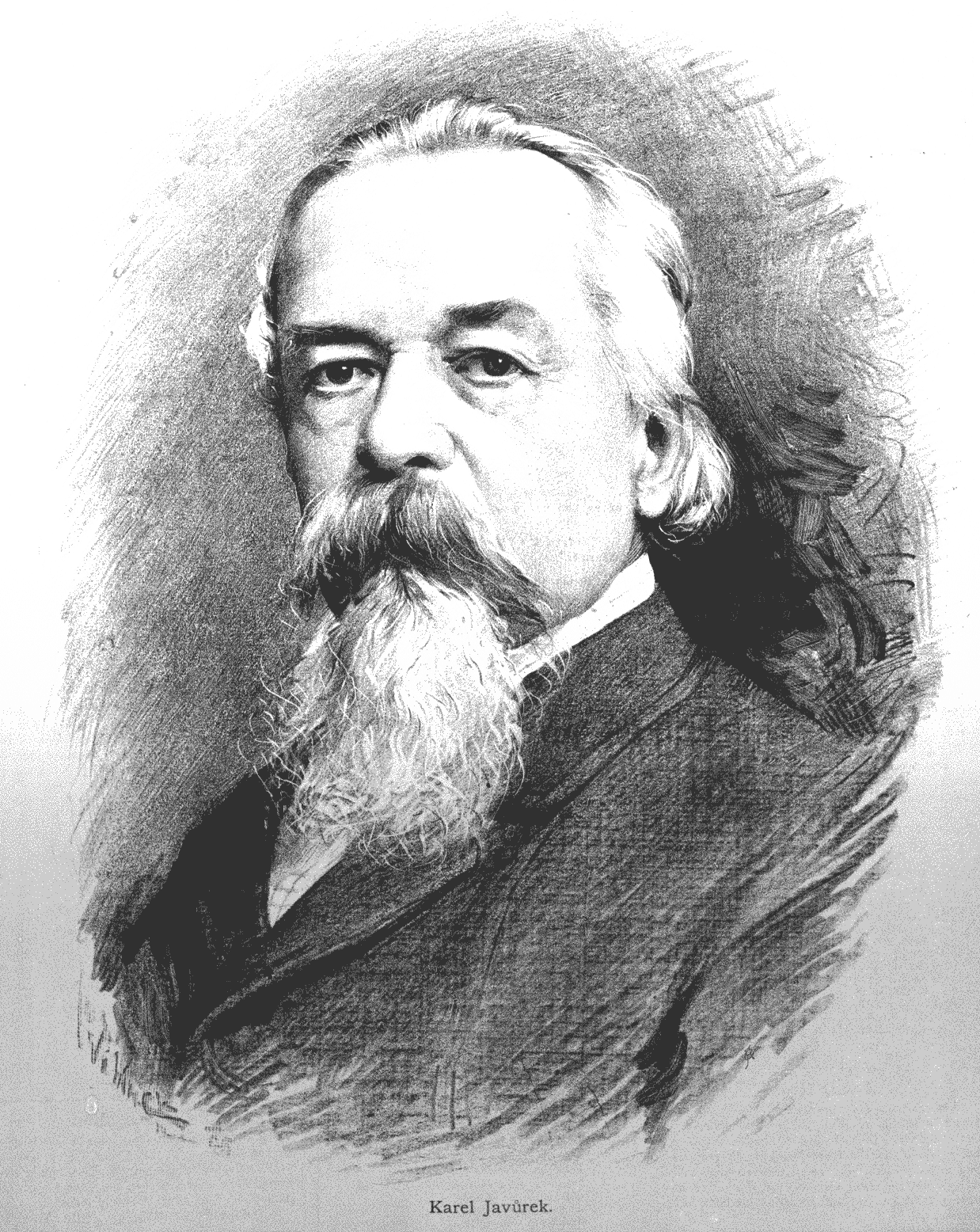
Karel Javůrek, by Jan Vilímek (1885)

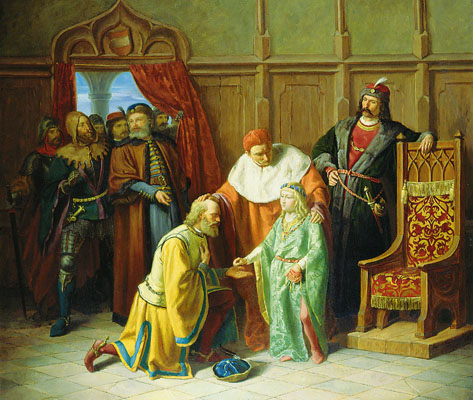
Ladislaus the Posthumous (date unknown)

Karel Javůrek (30 July 1815 – 23 March 1909) was a Czech history painter.

== Life and work ==
He was born in Prague as the son of a wealthy industrialist, but lost his father at an early age. His first studies were with Josef Danhauser in Vienna, then he returned to Prague to study with František Tkadlík and, later, Christian Ruben at the Academy of Fine Arts. He also participated in the revolutionary events of 1848.

From 1850 to 1852, he studied in Antwerp under Gustave Wappers then, in 1855, served as an apprentice at the studios of Thomas Couture in Paris. He returned to Prague and was a regular exhibitor at the art shows in the Rudolfinum.

He produced hundreds of paintings, covering virtually every period of Czech history, as well as works with religious themes. He and Jaroslav Čermák are considered to be the founders of Czech historical painting, but Javůrek lived long enough to see his works labelled as "old-fashioned". He died in 1909 in Prague.
