= Jana Budíková =

Czech painter and printmaker

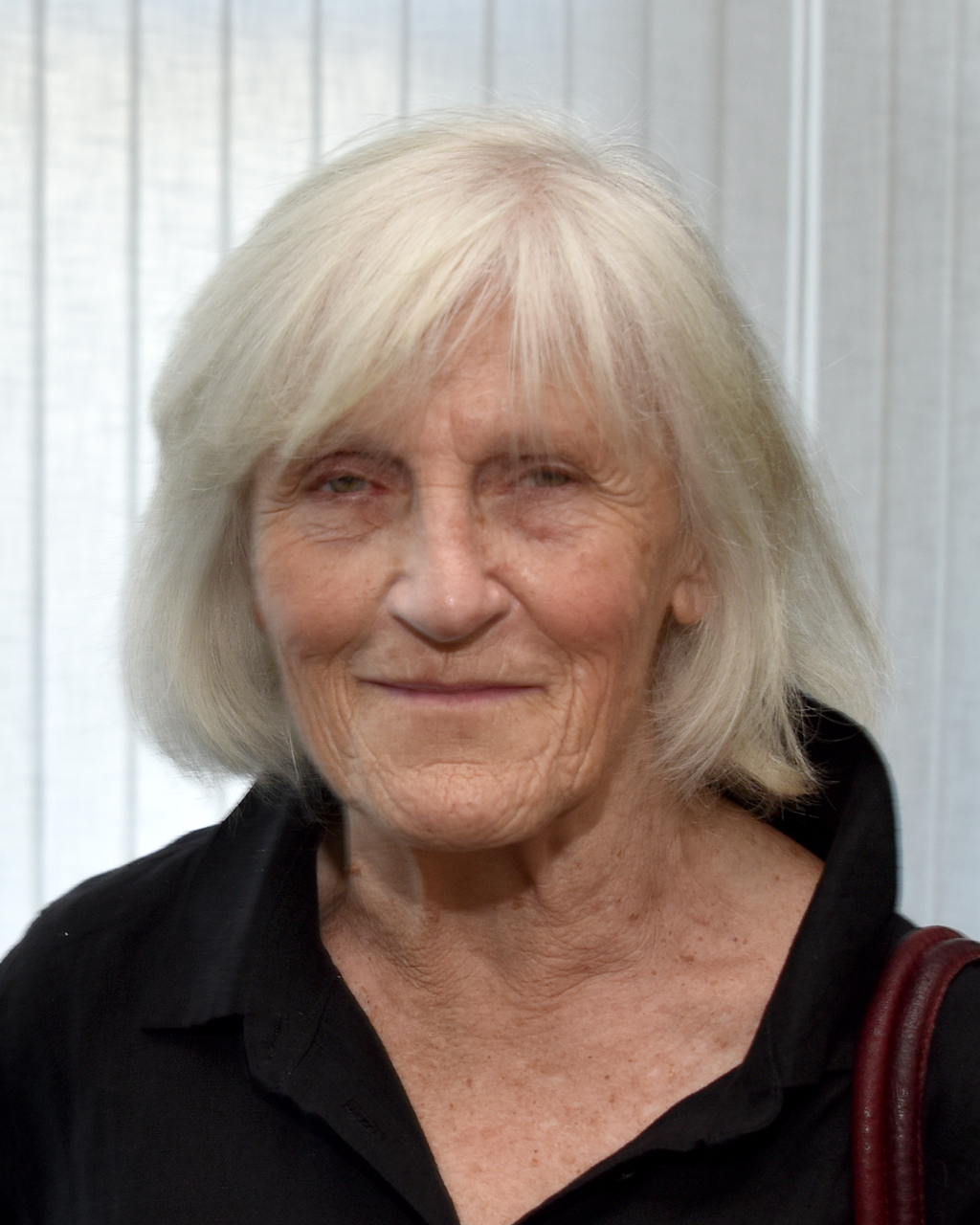
Jana Budíková (2026)

Jana Budíková (born 12 June 1946) is a Czech painter and printmaker.

Budíková graduated from the Theatre Faculty of the Academy of Performing Arts in Prague, where she studied from 1965 until 1971. She has been a member of the groups Umělecká beseda and Hollar during her career. She is a relative of the composer Otakar Jeremiáš. She has exhibited her work extensively throughout the Czech Republic.

A silkscreen by Budíková, Dedìkace/Dedication of 1995, is owned by the National Gallery of Art.
