= Johann Leopold Hay =

Czech bishop (1735–1794)

- Bishop of Hradec Králové
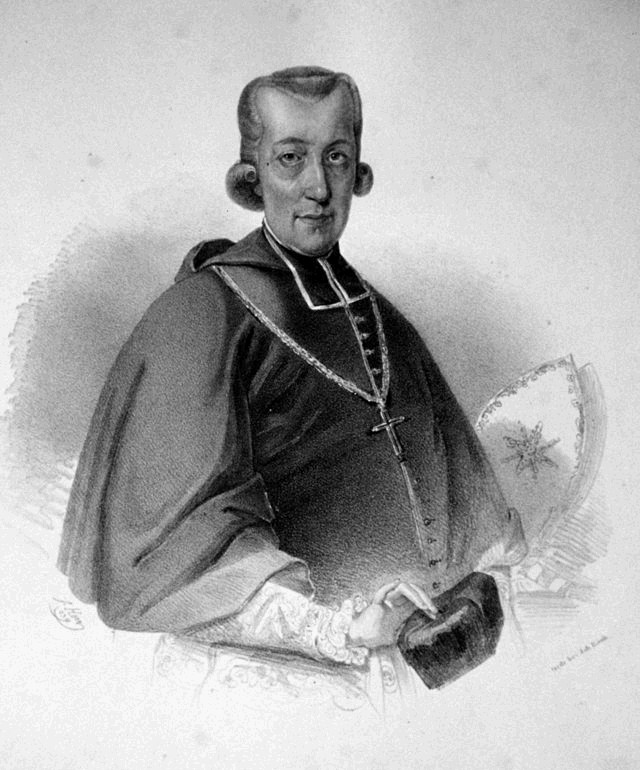
- Lithograph by Faustin Herr, 1839
- Church: Roman Catholic Church
- Diocese: Roman Catholic Diocese of Hradec Králové
- Installed: 11 December 1780
- Term ended: 1 June 1794

Personal details
- Born: 22 April 1735 Fulnek
- Died: 1 June 1794 (aged 59) Chrast
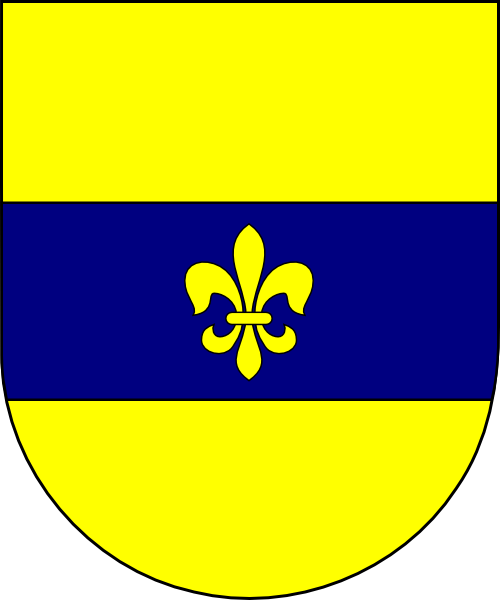
- Coat of arms

Johann Leopold Hay (22 April 1735, Fulnek – 1 June 1794, Chrast) was Bishop of Hradec Králové from 11 December 1780 until his death.
