= Ignaz Cornova =

Jesuit priest (1740–1822)

- Born: 25 July 1740; Prague, Bohemia
- Died: 25 July 1822 (aged 82); Prague, Bohemia
- Occupation: Author, historian, Jesuit priest, teacher

Ignaz Cornova (25 July 1740 – 25 July 1822) was a Jesuit priest who had spent his life and career in Bohemia. His family provenance was Italian, but his social and professional network revolved around the ethnically German community centred on Prague. He can be variously described as a historian, a teacher, an author and an early representative of the European Catholic Enlightenment movement. He was also a prominent Freemason.

== Life ==
Ignaz Cornova was born and died in Prague. His father was a businessman originally from Como. He attended the Jesuit Gymnasium (Secondary school) within the old city-walls of Prague. Between 1756 and 1759 (sources differ) he himself became a member of the Jesuit order. He went on to undertake a further period of training in Brünn (as Brno would have been known at that time). He spent a year as a student in Bresnitz during 1759/60 and then between 1760 and 1764 studied at Olomouc/Olmütz where the focus of his studies was on philosophy and theology. Cornova was ordained in 1770 after which he pursued a teaching career, focusing initially on grammar and quickly broadening his scope to include poetry, Classical Greek and humanities subjects more broadly.

From his own subsequently published correspondence it appears that Cornova was working as a school teacher well before the conclusion of his university studies. He started teaching at the Jesuit Gymnasium (Secondary school) in Brünn in 1762. During 1770/71 his teaching career was interrupted by the demands of his priestly duties. Then between 1771 and 1773 he was employed in Chomutov/Komotau (roughly equidistant between Leipzig and Prague) as a "Präses" (loosely, "professor" or "senior teacher") at both the Jesuit seminary and the city gymnasium (secondary school) in Chomutov/Komotau (roughly equidistant between Leipzig and Prague). Pupils whom he taught during this period included the railway pioneer František Josef Gerstner. He then, early in 1773, became a professor of poetry and Classical Greek at the Jesuit college in Klatovy/Klattau, a town with a strong Jesuit presence, located to the south-west of Prague.

The outlawing of the Jesuits which became effective in the Habsburg territories during 1773 deeply impacted Cornova's career, but he was able to return to Prague and obtain a post teaching humanities at the "Altstädter Gymnasium" (secondary school) in the city for ten years till 1784. It was during this period that he received his doctorate on philosophy. Then, between 1784 and 1794, he held a professorship in history at the university. During this time, in 1790, he accepted an appointment as dean of the philosophy faculty. In 1791 he was made a member of the Royal Bohemian Society ("Regia Societas Scientiarum Bohemica"). After 1795 he supported himself as a private educator, while composing lyric poems in the style of Klopstock.

== Works ==
Cornova's principal contribution to historical scholarship is the new edition of Pavel Stránský's Respublica Bojema (1634) and the translation of it into German, adding numerous supplementary notes. His further publications included a monograph about Bohuslav Hasištejnský z Lobkovic. His surviving works on philosophy include handwritten lecture notes about the methodologies of history teaching at Prague University.

Although Ignaz Cornova was influenced by Voltaire, but an earlier and more profound influence came from Herder, who impacted his approach to the role of the Slavic nations. The historical developments of the "Enlightenment" he viewed as a series of stages in the unfolding of historical events which could be attributed to the natural laws governing human development. He also recognised that the well-being and condition of a state depended on the well-being of its citizens and their understanding of morality.
