= Luboš Horčička =

Czech ice hockey player

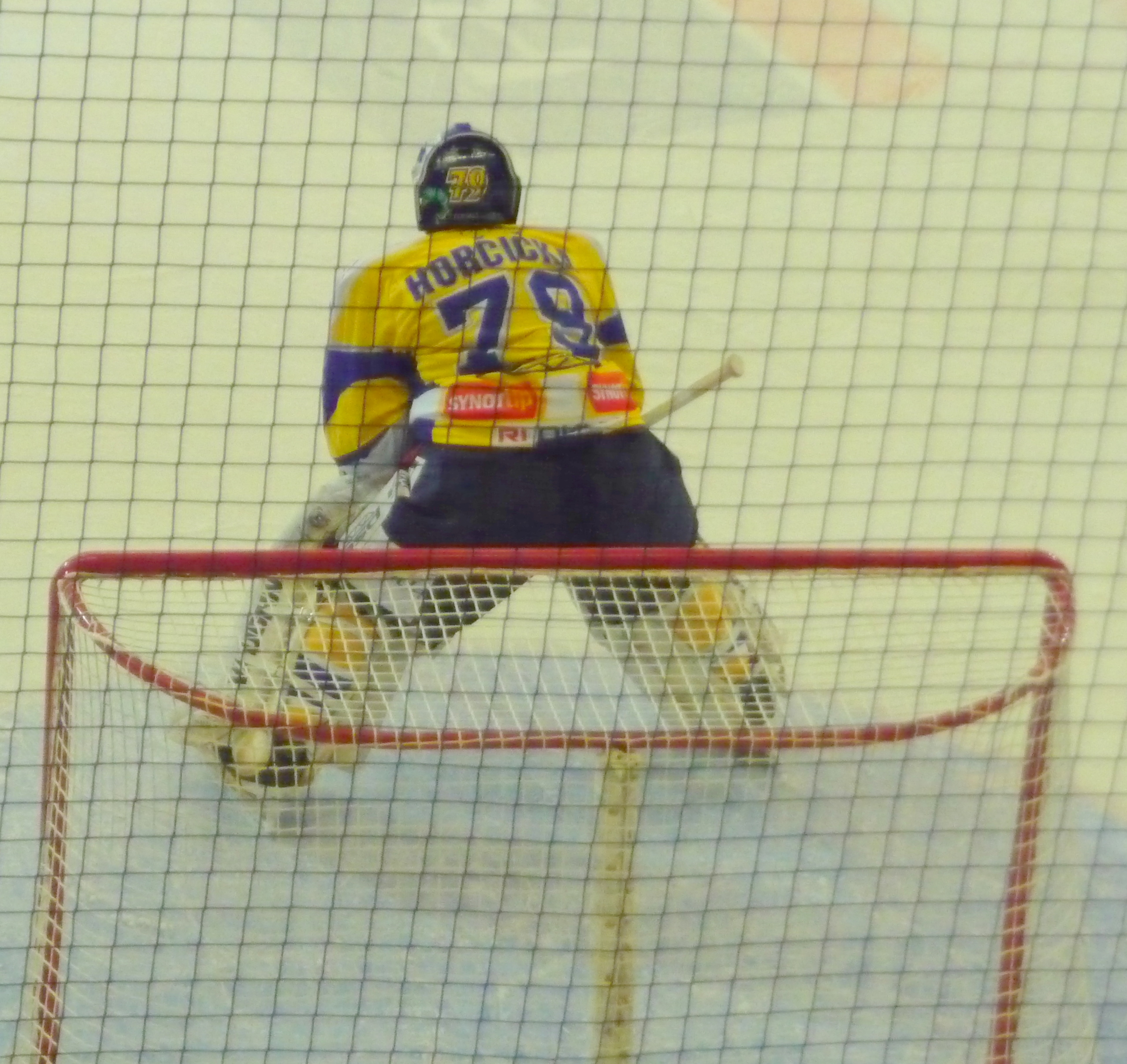
- HC Kometa Brno v PSG Zlín, goalkeeper of PSG Zlín Luboš Horčička
- Born: 21 May 1979 (age 45); Kladno, Czechoslovakia
- Height: 5 ft 11 in (180 cm)
- Weight: 181 lb (82 kg; 12 st 13 lb)
- Position: Goaltender
- Catches: Right
- Czech Extraliga team: HC Plzeň
- Playing career: 1997–present

Luboš Horčička (born 21 May 1979) is a Czech professional ice hockey goaltender. He played with HC Plzeň in the Czech Extraliga during the 2010–11 season.

Horčička previously played for HC Kladno, HC Oceláři Třinec, SK Kadaň, KLH Chomutov and Orli Znojmo.
