= Antonín Mánes =

Czech painter and draftsman

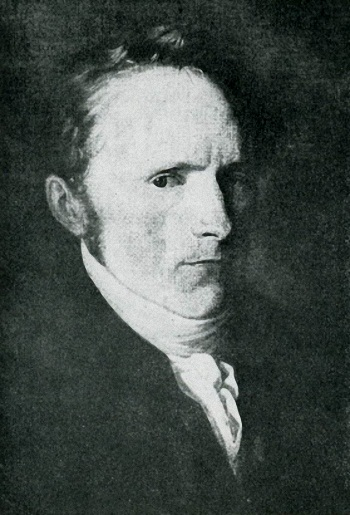
Self-portrait (1825)

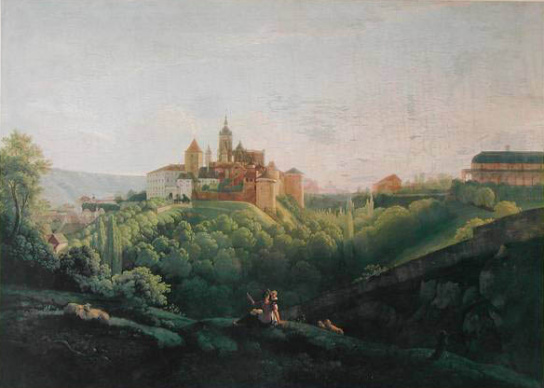
Prague Castle (date unknown)

Antonín Mánes (3 November 1784 – 23 July 1843) was a Czech painter and draftsman.

== Life ==
Mánes was born and died in Prague, which was part of the Austrian Empire when he died. He was the son of a miller and was self-taught because his family could not afford to send him to art school. For a time, he earned some extra money working as a painter in a porcelain factory. It wasn't until 1806 that he was able to attend the Academy of Fine Arts, where he was heavily influenced by his teacher, Karel Postl. In 1836, he became a professor of landscape painting at the academy. Among his best-known students were Eduard Herold and Johann Kautsky.

He eventually went from painting idealized landscapes to a more romanticized approach and was very fond of the Old Masters. His sons Josef and Quido and his daughter Amalie also became painters.
