= Josef Mánes =

Czech painter (1820–1871)

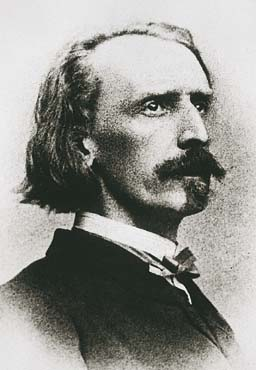
- Josef Mánes (date unknown)
- Born: 12 May 1820; Prague, Bohemia, Austrian Empire
- Died: 9 December 1871 (aged 51); Prague, Bohemia, Austria-Hungary
- Occupation: Painter

Josef Mánes (12 May 1820 – 9 December 1871) was a Czech painter.

== Life ==
He came from a family of painters, which included his father Antonín, his uncle and Director of the Prague Art Academy Václav, his brother Quido and his sister Amalie.

His first painting lessons naturally came from his father. From 1835 to 1844, he studied at the Academy of Fine Arts, Prague, under Professors František Tkadlík and Christian Ruben. He continued his studies in Munich for two years. Upon his return, an affair with the family's maid had unpleasant results and created an estrangement with some members of his family that left him in a state of severe depression. He found refuge in the patronage of Count Bedřich Silva-Tarouca, living and working at his castle in Čechy pod Kosířem for twenty years. From there, he made many trips throughout Moravia, Upper Hungary (Slovakia) and Poland.

He took an active role in many artistic, literary and patriotic societies. He also participated in Sokol, an athletic organization for young men, designing uniforms and other materials for them. In 1867, he visited Russia and, three years later, took a trip to Italy.

From 1866, his mental state worsened rapidly, afflicting him with bizarre behavior and obsessions. A recuperative trip to Italy failed to improve his health and he died in 1871, after much suffering. It is believed that his brain had been affected by syphilis or meningitis.

== Work and honors ==
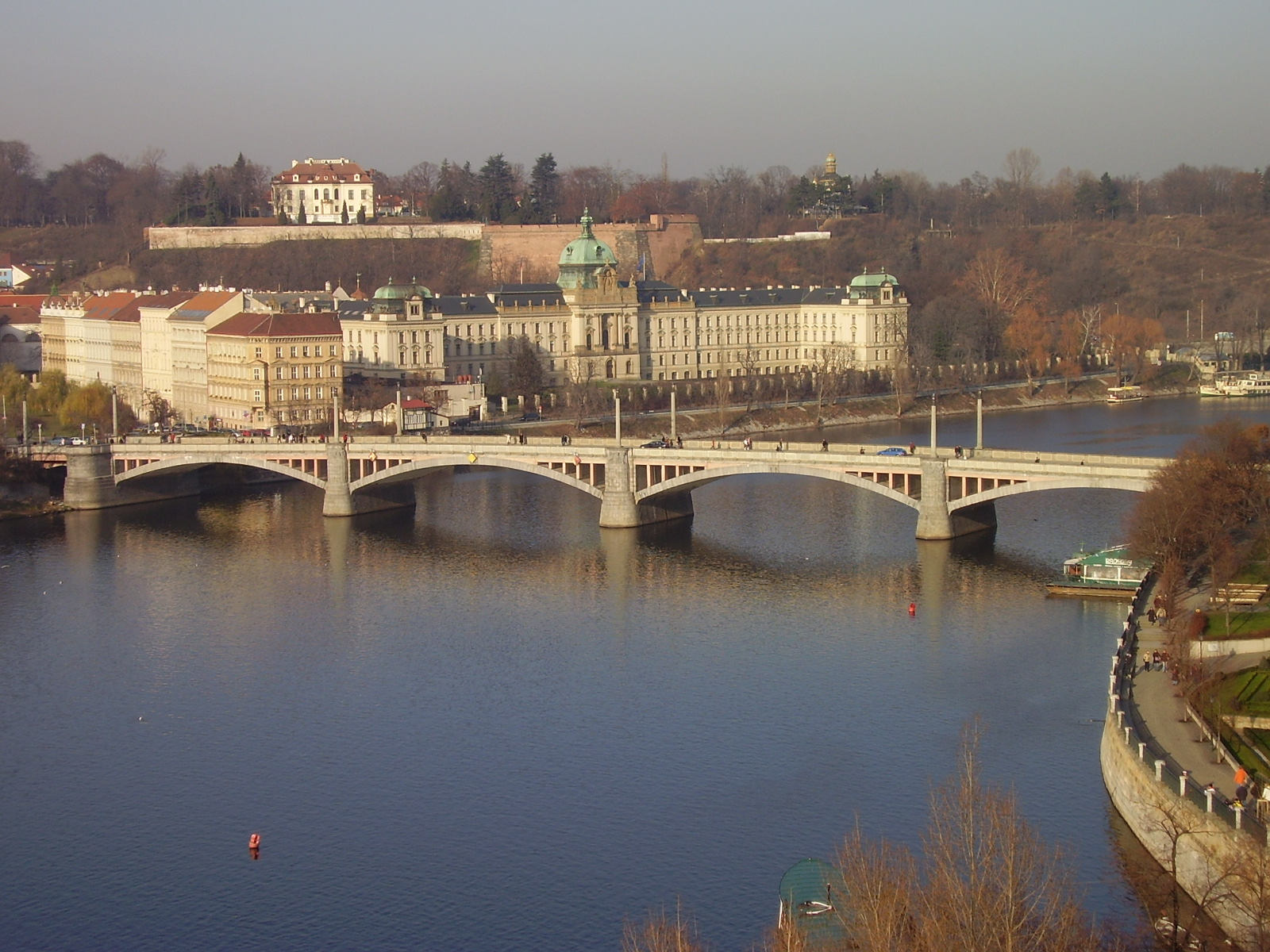
Mánes Bridge (Mánesův most), the first bridge downstream of the famous Charles Bridge, was in 1920 renamed in the painter's honour

He produced many paintings in every genre from landscapes and portraits to ethnographic and botanical studies. He even did paintings of the twelve months (Calendar plate) in face of the Prague Astronomical Clock. Although his work was little understood or appreciated in his lifetime, he is now considered to be among the greatest Czech painters.

In 1887, the Mánes Union of Fine Arts was created in his honor. One of the central bridges over the Vltava River bears his name and includes a statue of the painter at the Old Town end. His image has appeared on several Czechoslovak and Czech postage stamps.

== Gallery ==
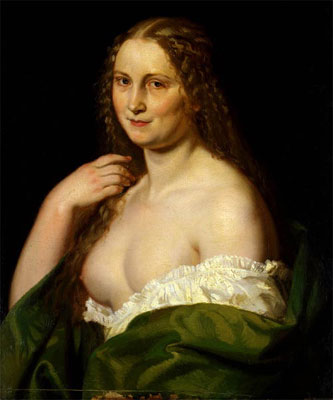
Josefína (Josephine)

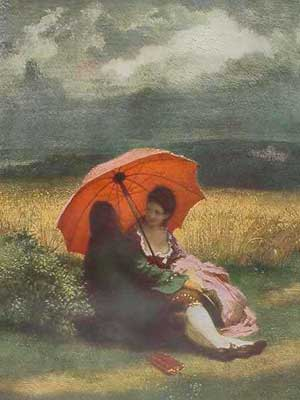
Milenci (Lovers)

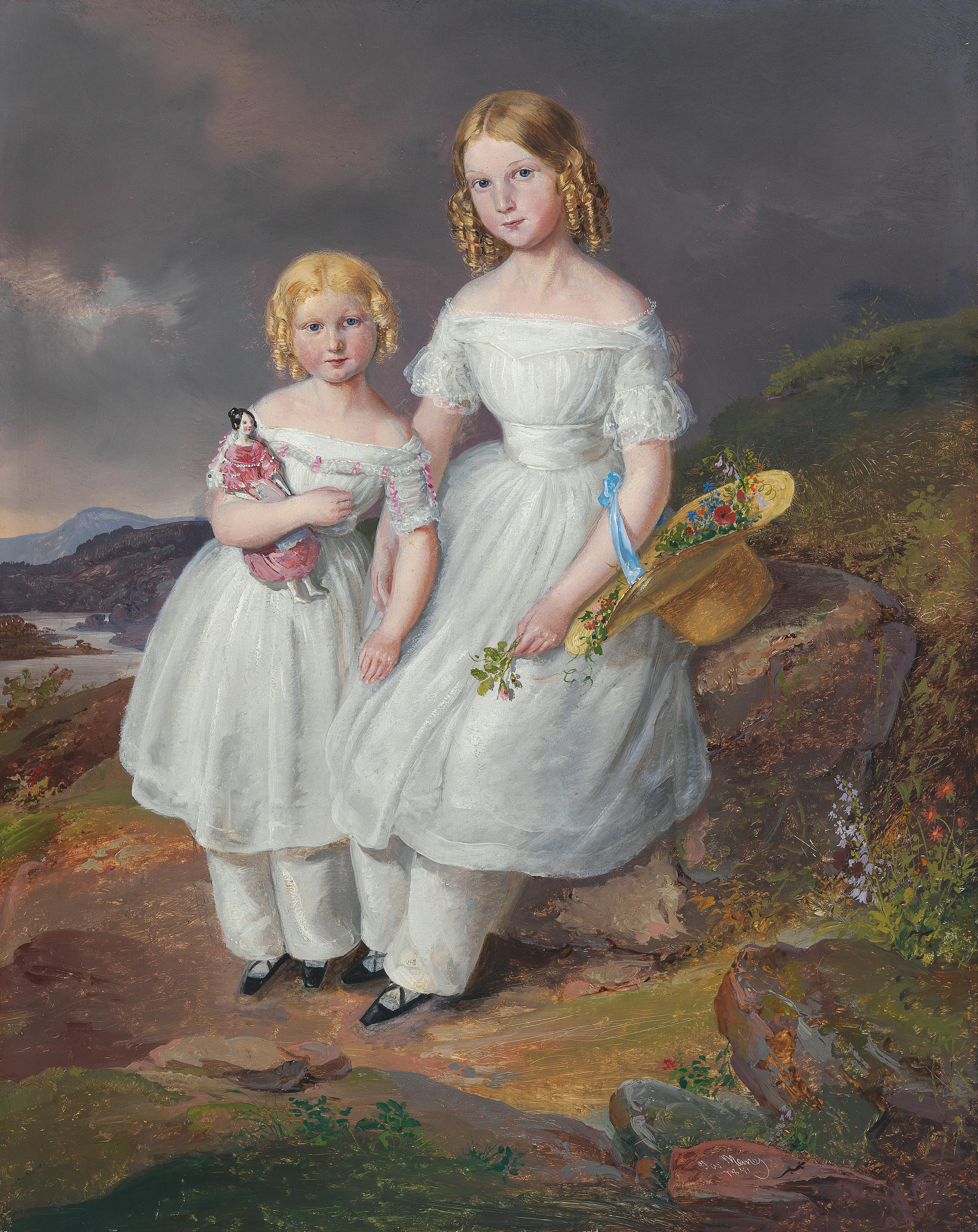
Sestry Františka a Serafína Kolowrat Krakowských

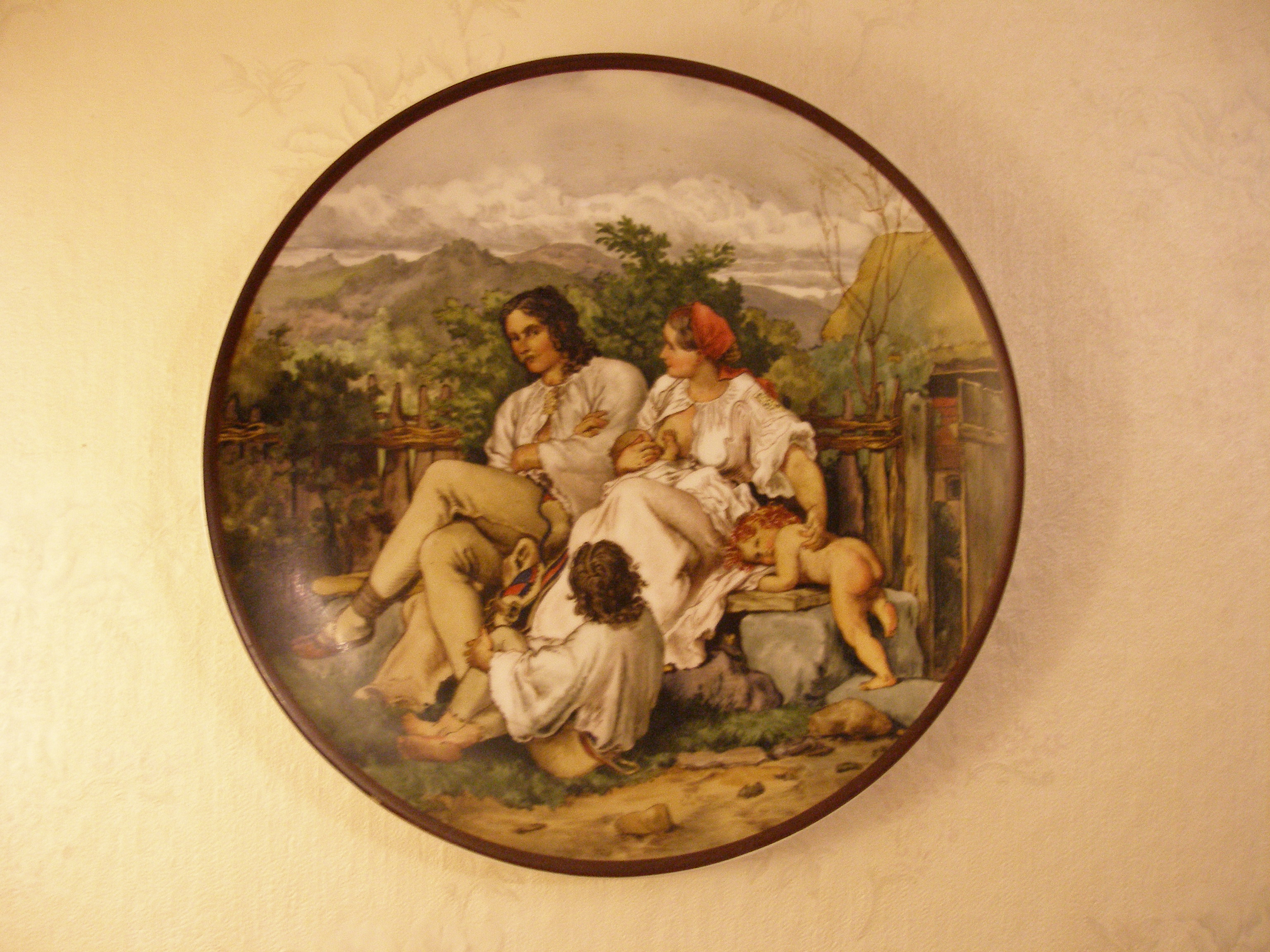
Slovácká rodina (Family of Slovácko)

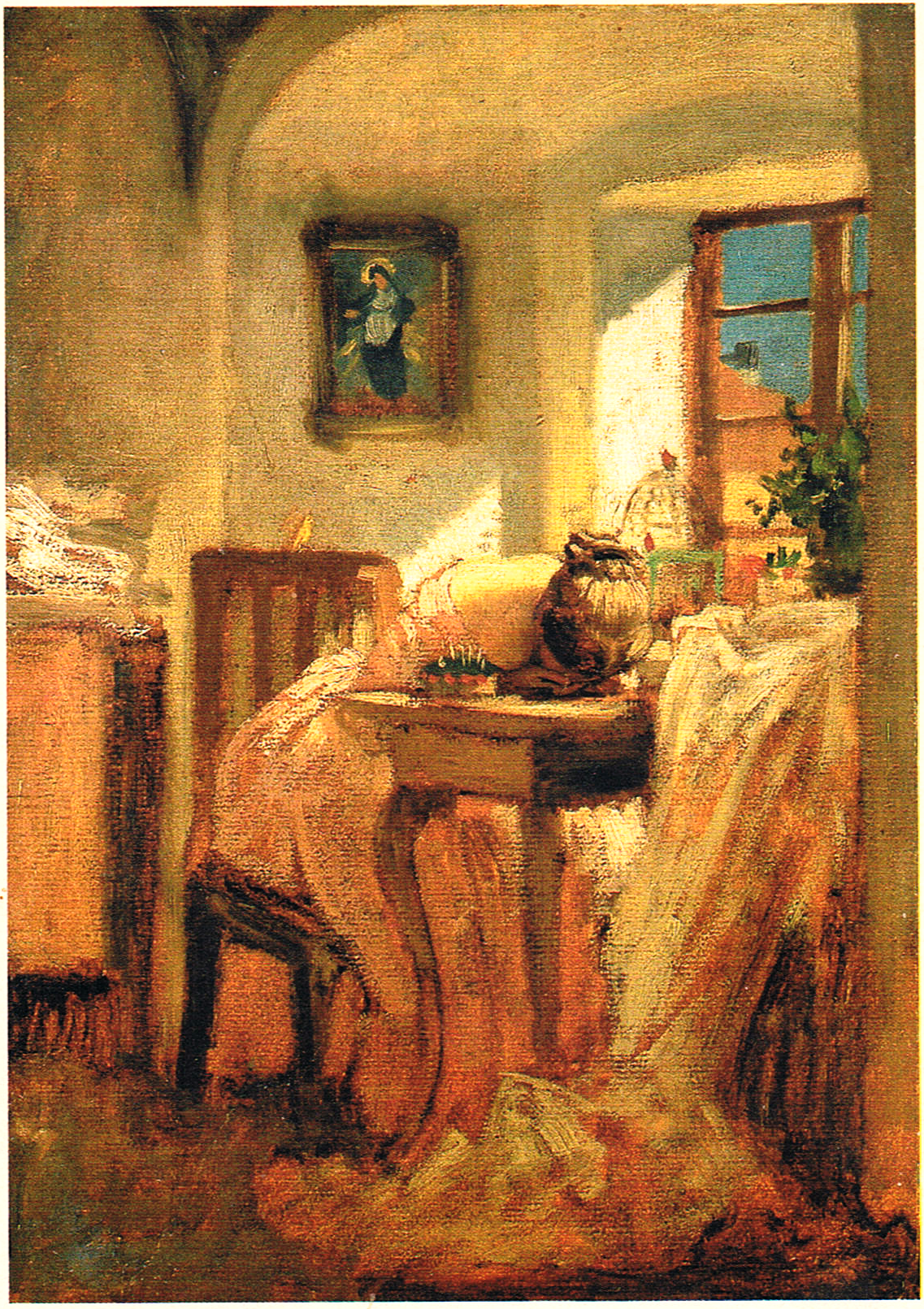
Švadlenka (Seamstress)

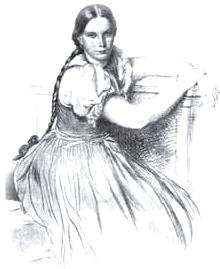
sketch

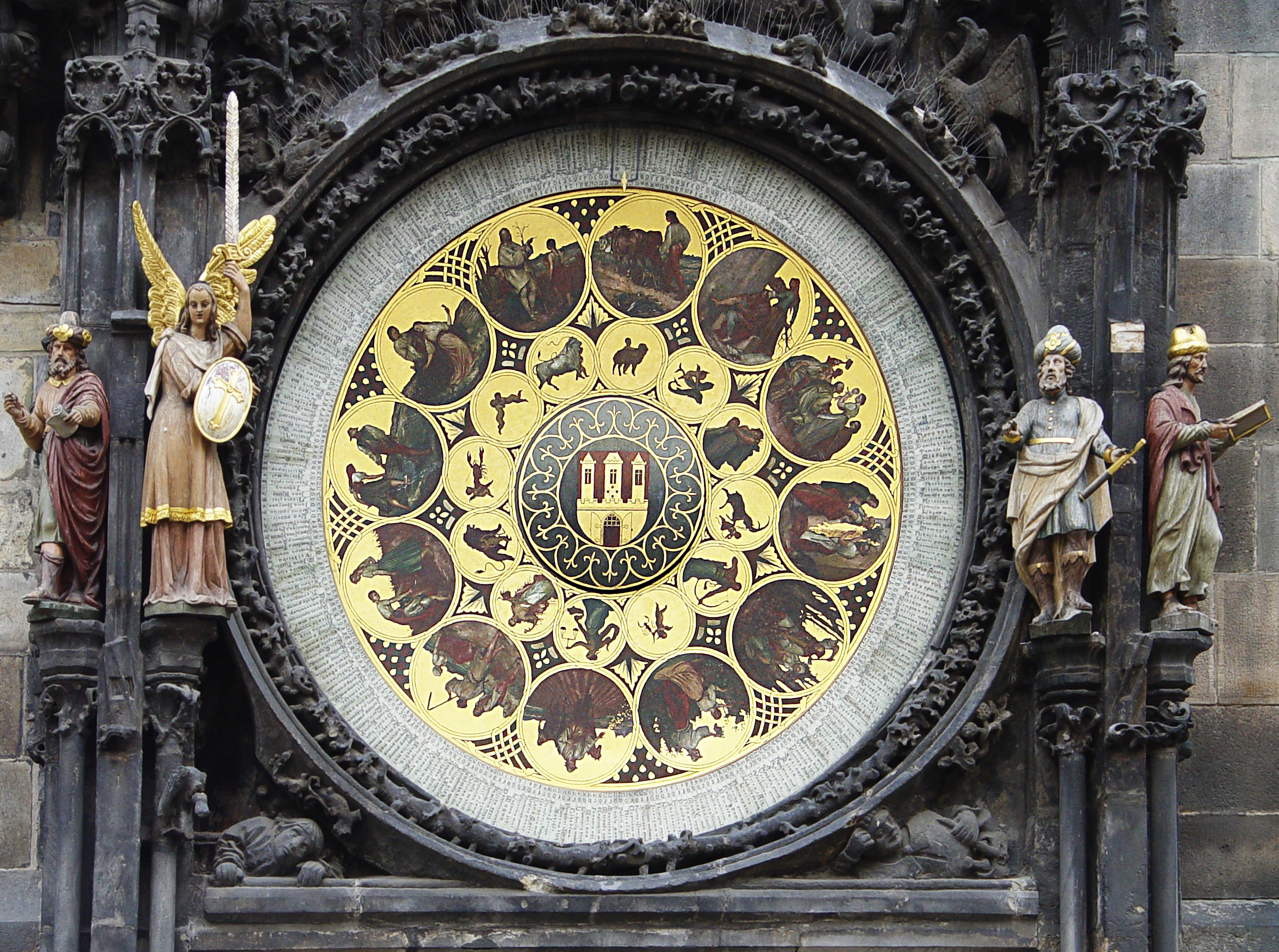
Face of the Prague Astronomical Clock (painted 1864–66)
