= Ludvík Kohl =

Czech-Austrian painter, draftsman and etcher

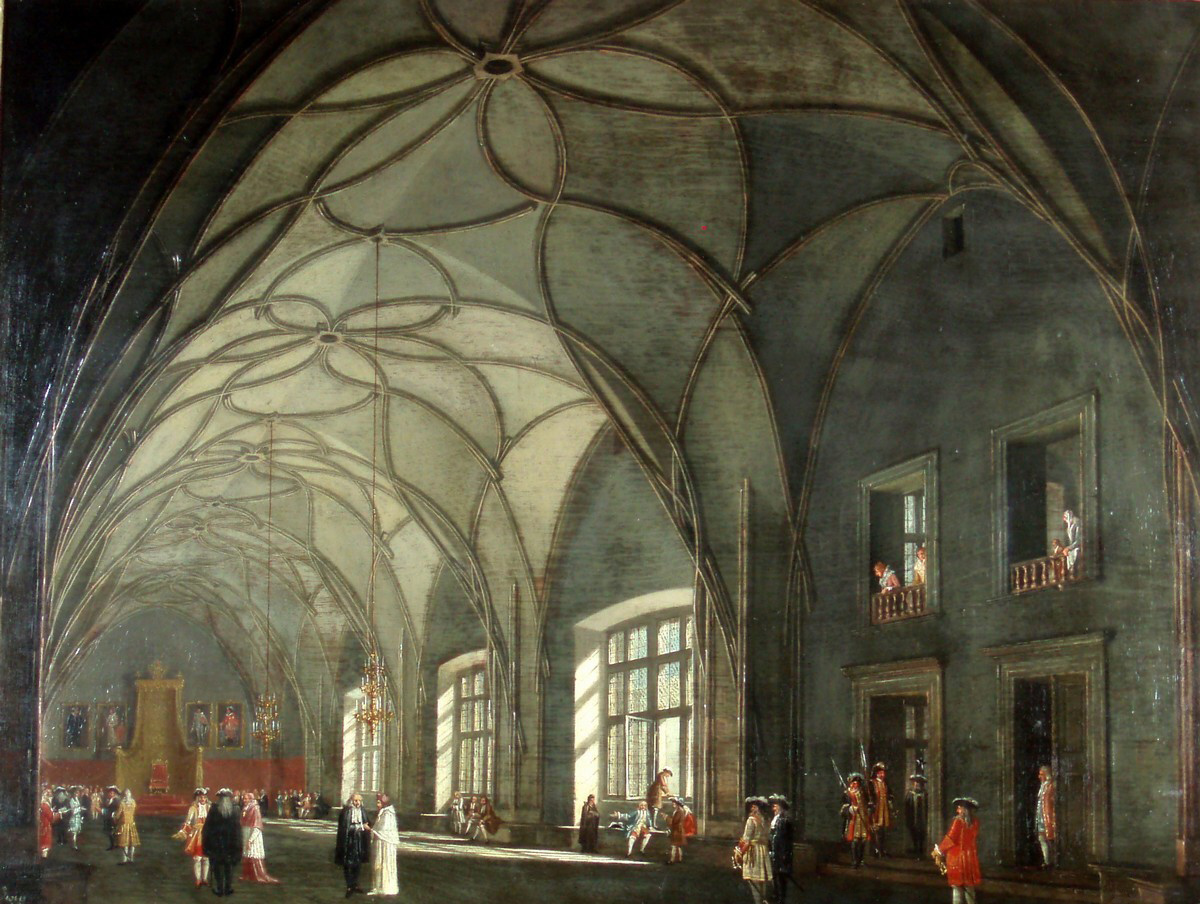
Vladislav Hall

Ludvík Kohl (German: Ludwig Kohl; 14 April 1746 – 18 June 1821) was a Czech-Austrian painter, draftsman and etcher.

== Biography ==
Ludvík Kolh was born on 14 April 1746 in Prague, Bohemia, Holy Roman Empire. His father, Antonín Kohl, was an engraver and his grandfather was the sculptor, Jeroným Kohl. He graduated from the Piarist school in Malá Strana, where he was a pupil of the Bohemian historian, Gelasius Dobner. During these years, he also took private painting lessons from Norbert Grund. Later, he became the first teacher of his younger brother, Kliment Kohl.

After 1766, he continued his studies at the Academy of Fine Arts, Vienna, with Jacob Matthias Schmutzer and became a full member of the academy in 1769. He returned to Prague the following year and, until his death, taught drawing at the Royal Normal school. In 1799, he helped establish the Academy of Fine Arts, Prague and, in 1818, he was awarded the Golden Medal for Civil Merit.

His early work shows traces of influence from the Baroque, but he later switched to Viennese Neoclassicism.

Most of works involve interior and exterior views of monumental buildings, although he also created some works with religious and historical themes. He would sometimes collaborate with Clemens, who helped him turn his works into copperplate engravings. Of especial note are his proposed designs for the completion of St. Vitus Cathedral at the Prague Castle complex.

He died on 18 June 1821 in Prague.

== Selected works ==
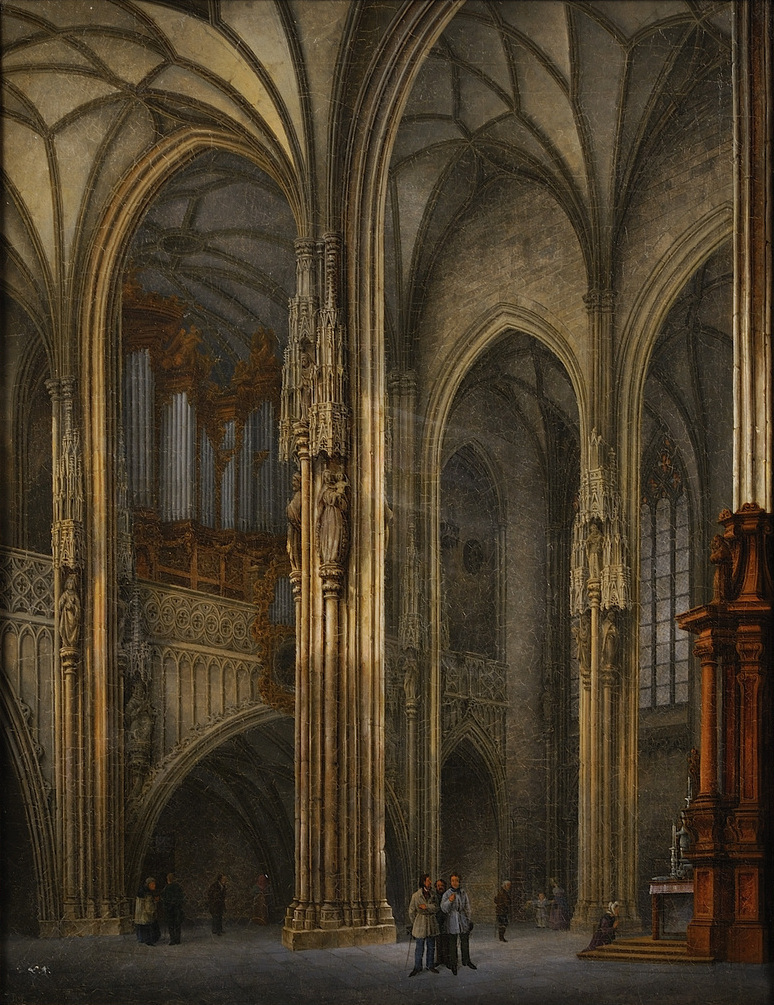
The Interior of St. Stephen's Cathedral

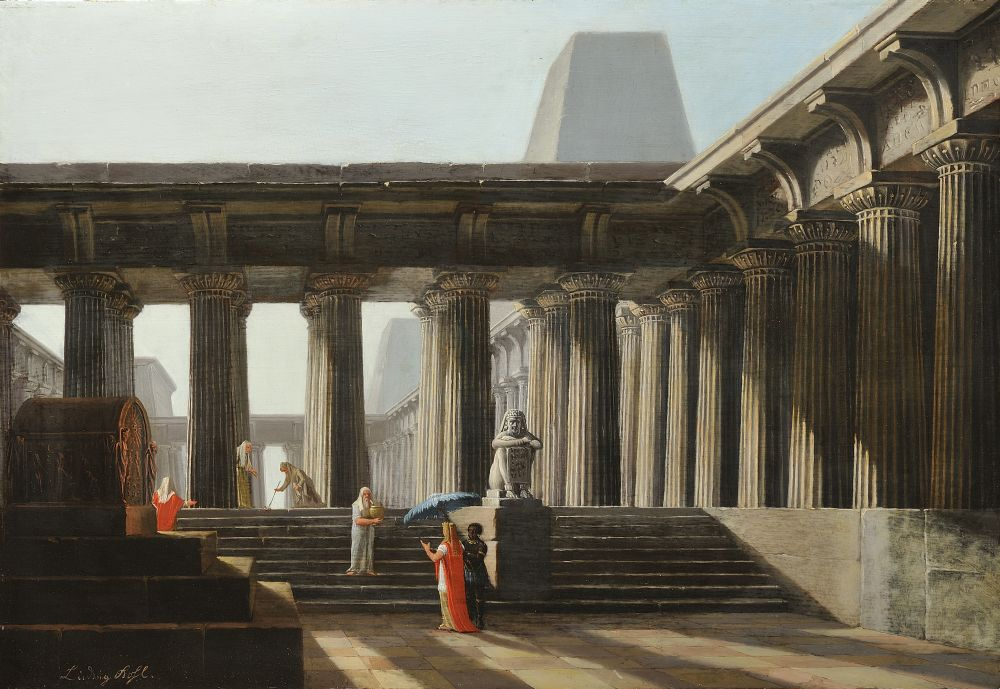
Egyptian Peristyle Court

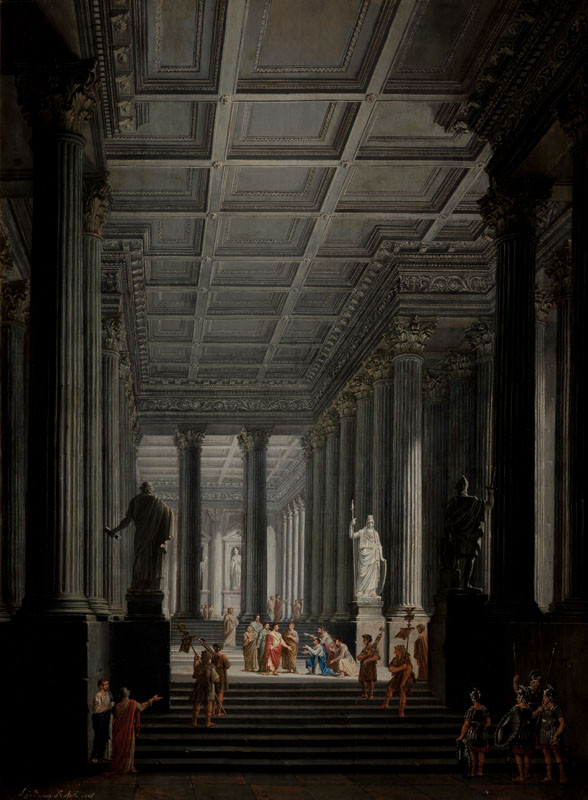
In an Ancient Palace (1816)

== Sources ==
- Gottfried Johann Dlabacz: Allgemeines historisches Künstler-Lexikon für Böhmen und zum Theile auch für Mähren und Schlesien. Band 2, Gottlieb Haase, Prag 1815, Sp. 96–101 (Online).
- Georg Kaspar Nagler Neues allgemeines Künstler-Lexicon oder Nachrichten aus dem Leben und den Werken der Maler, Bildhauer, Baumeister, Kupferstecher, Formschneider, Lithographen, Zeichner, Medailleure, Elfenbeinarbeiter, etc. Band 7, E. A. Fleischmann, München 1839, S. 127 (Online).
- Biography @ the Biographisches Lexikon des Kaiserthums Oesterreich
- Rudolf Müller (1882). "Kohl, Ludwig" . Allgemeine Deutsche Biographie (in German). Vol. 16. Leipzig: Duncker & Humblot. pp. 428–430.
- Marcela Pánková: Ludvík Kohl (1746–1821). Národní Galerie, Prag 1984.
- (in German) Manfred Knedik: Kohl, Ludwig. In: Allgemeines Künstlerlexikon. Die Bildenden Künstler aller Zeiten und Völker (AKL). Band 81, de Gruyter, Berlin 2014, ISBN 978-3-11-023186-1, S. 170
