= František Tkadlík =

Czech painter and draftsman (1786-1840)

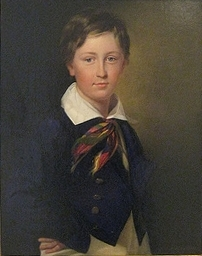
Portrait of Otakar, Count Czernin (1823)

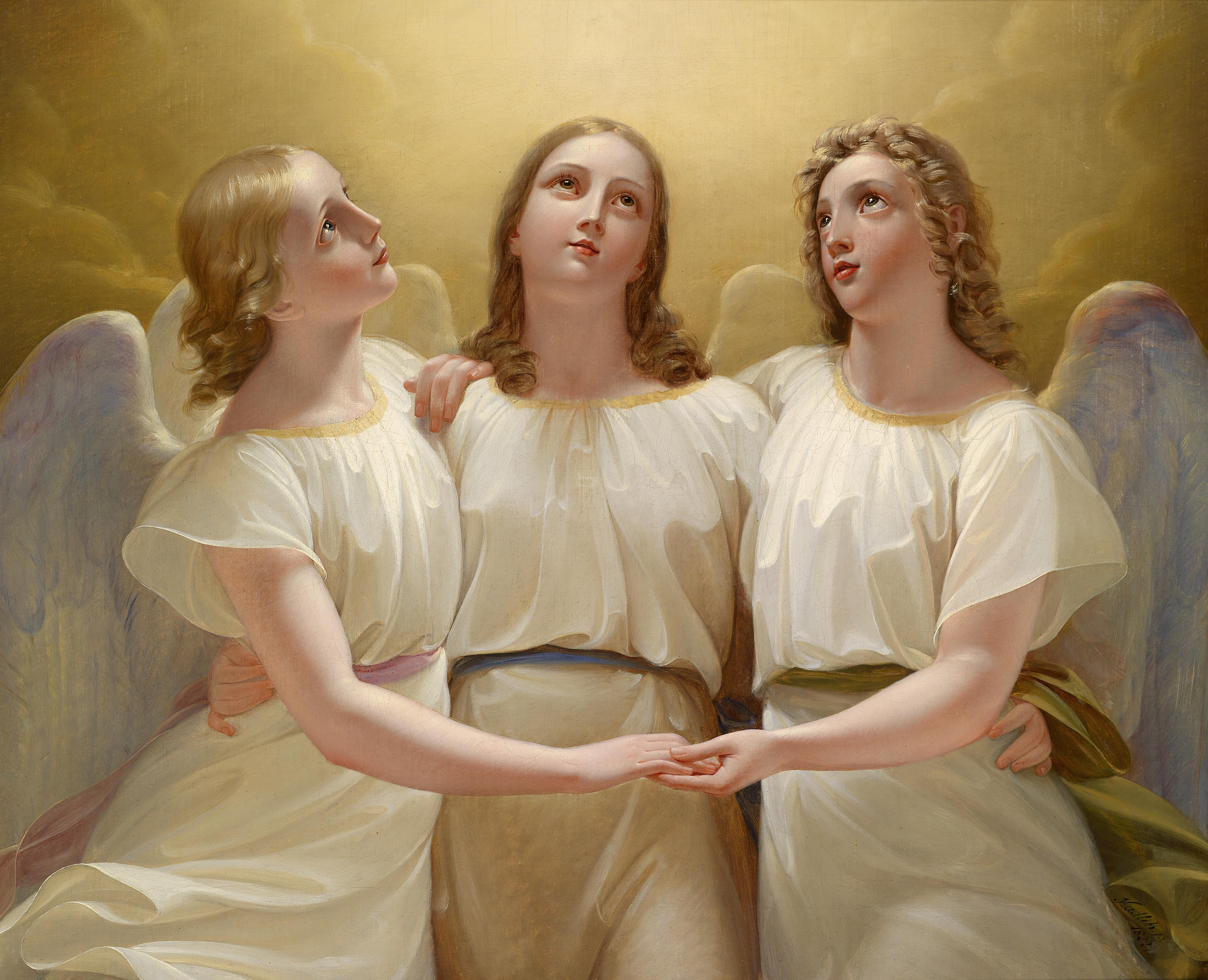
Three Angels (1822)

František Tkadlík (or Franz Kadlik; 23 November 1786 – 16 January 1840) was a Czech portrait painter and draftsman.

== Life ==
Tkadlík was born in Prague on 23 November 1786. He was the son of an innkeeper and displayed an early aptitude for drawing. Two of the boarders at his parents' inn were drawing teachers and they encouraged him in his desire to be an artist. Wealthy relatives were won over to the cause and he was soon enrolled at the Academy of Fine Arts, later attending Charles University, where he studied philosophy.

The National Revival in Bohemia had a decisive influence on his work. On a recommendation by Professor Joseph Bergler, he came under the patronage of Johann Rudolf Czernin, the Count von Chudenitz, which enabled him to continue his studies. From 1817 to 1825, he served as Court Painter to the House of Czernin and overseer for their collection of paintings in Vienna. He maintained close contact with many Czech scholars, such as Josef Dobrovský and František Palacký, which deepened his nationalistic feelings.

After completing his work in Vienna, he received an Imperial Pension courtesy of Klemens von Metternich, who had been a regular visitor at the Czernins. He spent several years studying in Rome, where he was influenced by the Nazarene movement. He returned to Vienna in 1832, then moved on to Prague in 1836, when he became the first Czech to be appointed Director of the Art Academy. Josef Mánes and Karel Javůrek were among his best-known students there.

He died in Prague on 16 January 1840, at the age of 53.
