= Václav Jansa =

Czech painter (1859–1913)

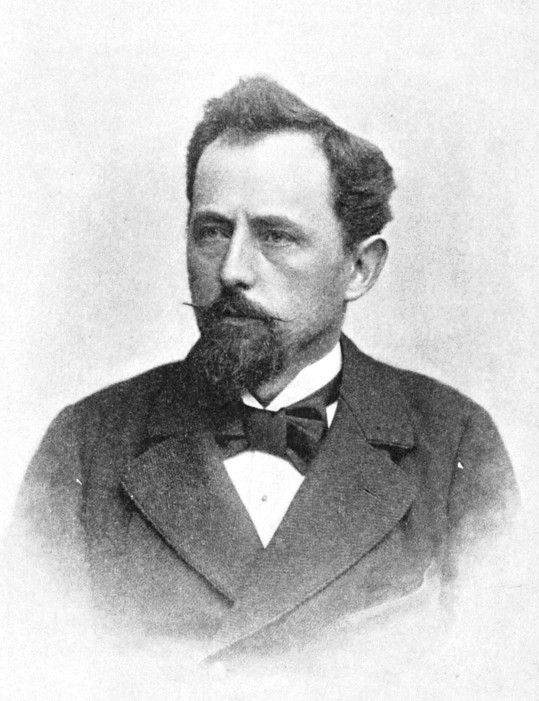
Václav Jansa (1896)

Václav Jansa (22 October 1859, Slatinice, near Most – 29 June 1913, Černošice) was a Czech landscape painter and illustrator; best known for his watercolors of the Old Town in Prague.

== Biography ==
Jansa was born in Slatinice (an extinct village in the area of today's Most-Čepirohy). When he was still a boy, his parents were hired as servants for Johann Joseph, Count Herberstein (1854–1944), so they moved to Solany, near Děčany in Litoměřice District. While there, he was apprenticed to a merchant, but drew and painted as a hobby.

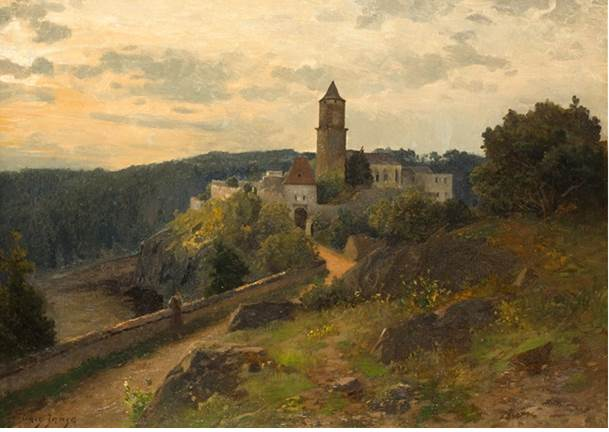
View of Zvíkov Castle

Eventually, he was able to gain admission to the Academy of Fine Arts, Prague, where he studied with Antonín Lhota. Later, he transferred to the Academy of Fine Arts, Vienna, where his instructors were Eduard von Lichtenfels and Leopold Carl Müller. After some time as a painter in Prague, he began to travel, working mostly in Southern Bohemia and Krkonoše. He also provided illustrations for Zlatá Praha and Světozor.

In 1894–1895, together with Karel Vítězslav Mašek and Vojtěch Bartoněk he worked on a monumental painting designed by Mikoláš Aleš. It was called Pobití Sasíků pod Hrubou Skálou (The Slaughter of the Saxons at Hrubá Skála, commemorating a 13th-century Czech victory) and measured 8.5 by 10 meters (28 by 33 ft). He was also one of several artists who collaborated on creating a panorama of the Battle of Lipany, designed by Luděk Marold, which is 11 meters (36 feet) high and 95 meters (312 feet) long.

During that same period, the Prague city government began to redevelop parts of the old city (Staré Město) and the Jewish ghetto. A commission was established to create an inventory and document the buildings that were slated for demolition. Pursuant to this, the Mánes Union of Fine Arts engaged Jansa to paint as much of the area as possible. During the late 1890s, he produced over 150 watercolors depicting the Staré Město and the Nové Město. Many of these were published in book form in 1908 and 1911.

Ironically, the small village where he was born was razed in the late 1960s, to make room for the expansion of a coal mine. The area has since been reclaimed as pastures and forest.

== Selected scenes of Prague ==
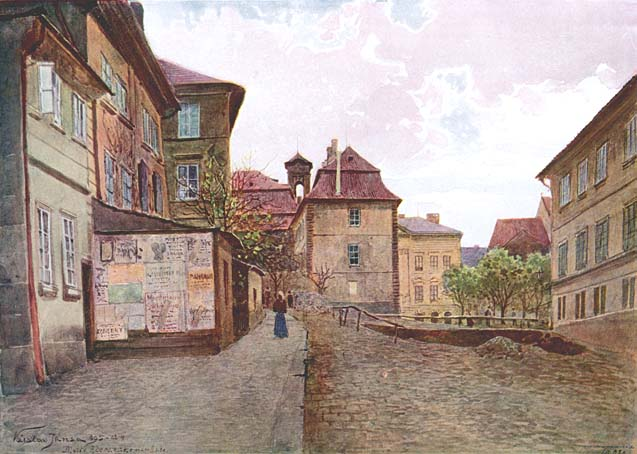
In Zderaz

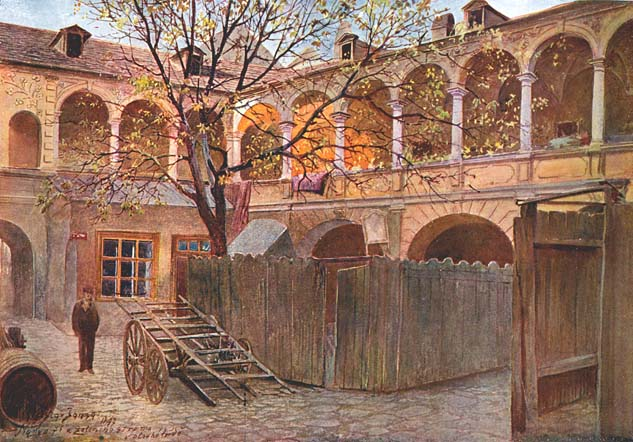
House at the Golden Tree

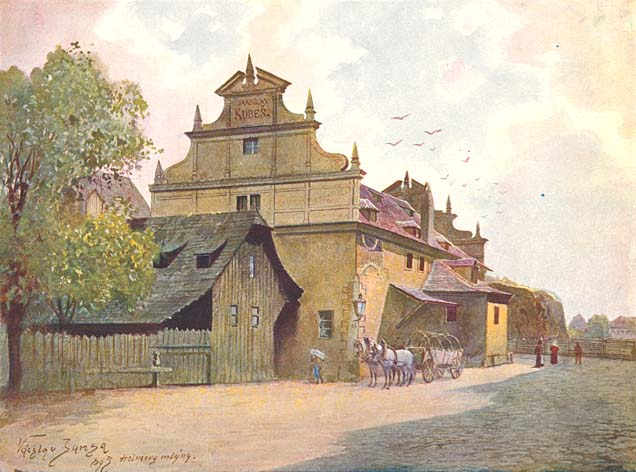
Helmovy Mills

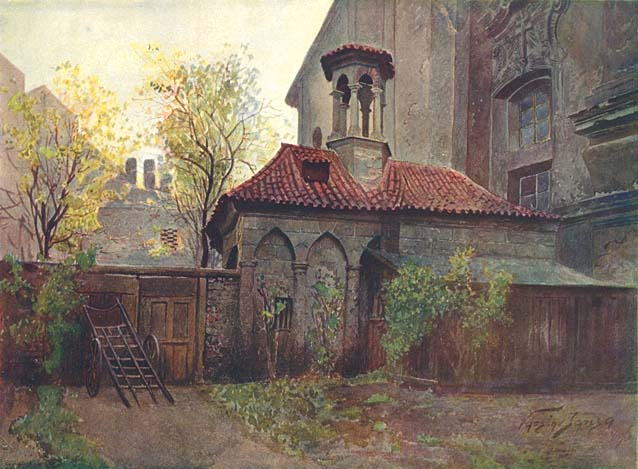
Chapel of the Holy Sepulchre
