= Vojtěch Bartoněk =

Czech painter

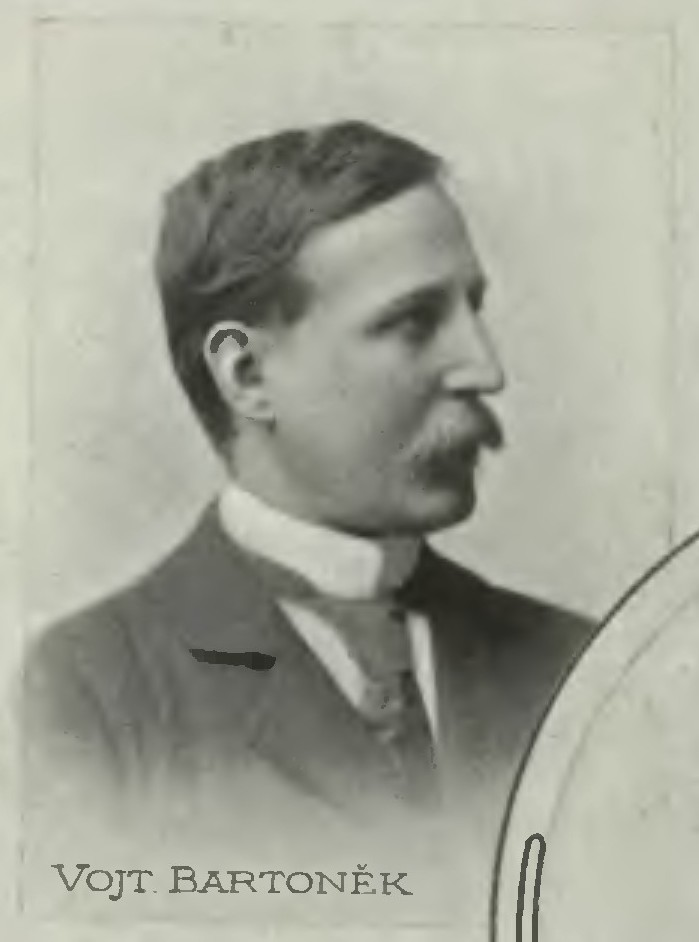
Vojtěch Bartoněk

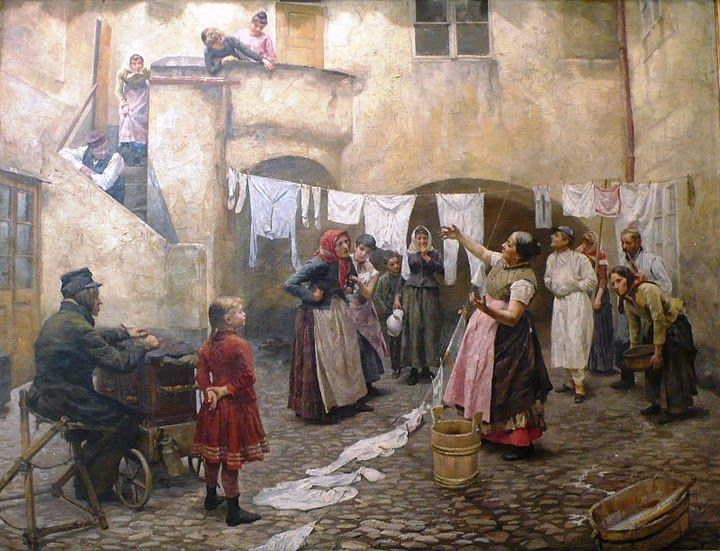
Dispute

Vojtěch Bartoněk (28 March 1859 – 25 August 1908 in Prague) was a Czech painter and art restorer.

== Life and work ==
He studied at the Academy of Fine Arts, Prague; initially with Jan Swerts, later with Antonín Lhota, Maximilian Pirner, František Sequens and František Čermák. He completed his studies in Paris at the École des Beaux Arts.

Primarily known as a history painter, he later turned to genre scenes from the streets and marketplaces of Prague. In 1888, his painting "Recruits" was purchased by Josef Hlávka, benefactor of the Czech Academy of Sciences.

He collaborated with Mikoláš Aleš on the diorama, Pobití Sasíků pod Hrubou Skálou (Killing the Saxons at Hruboskalsko) and illustrated some of the works of Božena Němcová. He also provided illustrations for Světozor and Zlatá Praha.

He also did architectural work; including the lunettes at the Old Town Market, and ceiling paintings at the Church of the Assumption in Klecany. Several churches have altar paintings by him and were the beneficiaries of his restorative work.
