= Josef Vojtěch Hellich =

Czech painter and archaeologist (1807–1880)

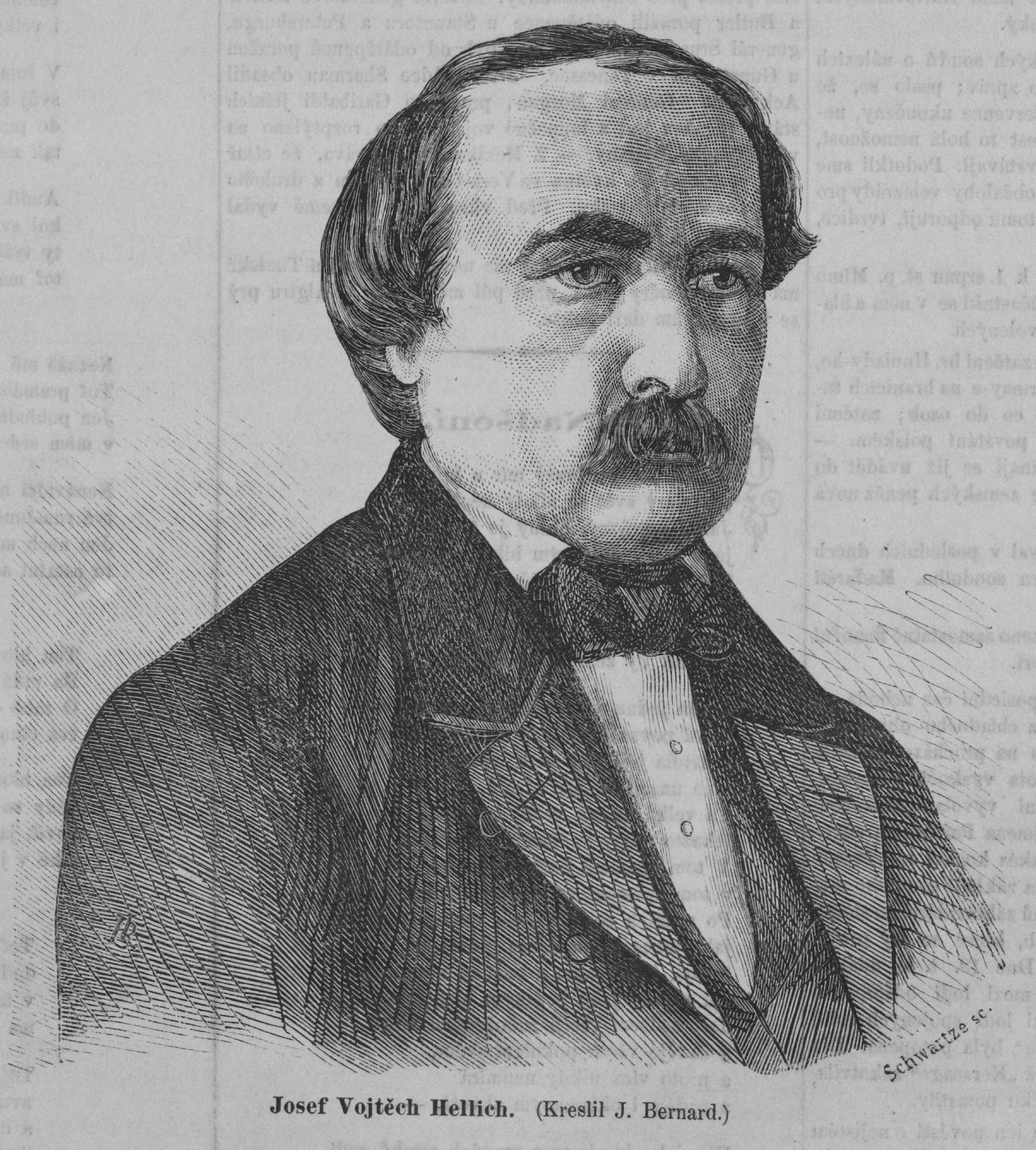
Portrait of Hellich from Zlatá Praha (1864)

Josef Vojtěch Hellich (17 April 1807 – 22 January 1880) was a Czech painter and archaeologist known mainly for religious works and historical scenes.

== Life ==
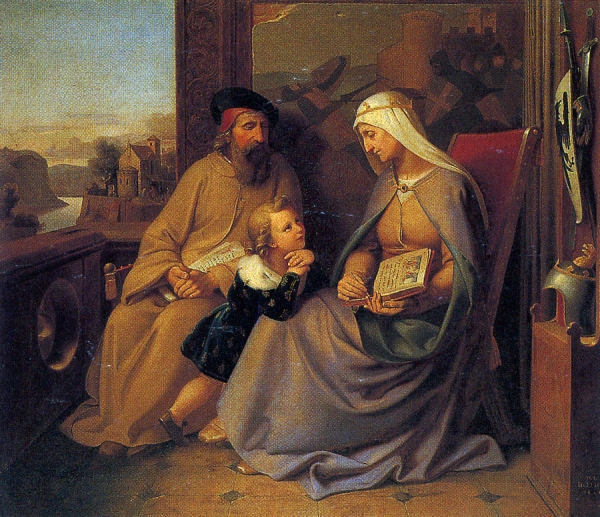
Saint Ludmila Teaching Saint Wenceslaus in Tetín

Hellich was born in Choltice. He attended the Academy of Fine Arts, Prague, where he studied with Joseph Bergler, and the Academy of Fine Arts, Munich. This was followed by an extended study and work trip to Italy, Switzerland, France and England. He returned to Prague in 1840 and established a successful studio. With a recommendation from František Palacký, he became involved in the activities of the National Museum; becoming custodian and documentarian for the new archaeological collections.

In the following years, he gathered items for the museum from Kouřim, Žatec, Tábor and České Budějovice; including ornaments from prehistoric burial sites. Then, with the assistance of Professor Jan Erazim Vocel, the works were classified and described. Later, he illustrated Vocel's O starožitnostech českých a o potřebě chránit je před zkázou (Czech Antiquities and the Need to Protect them from Destruction), which became a popular work with Czech nationalists.

He was also a regular contributor of lithographs to the journal Památky archeologické. Together with his fellow painter Vilém Kandler and the writers Ferdinand Břetislav Mikovec and Karel Zap, he published Starožitnosti a památky země České (Antiquities and Monuments of the Czech Lands). His religious works include over 290 altarpieces which can be seen throughout the Czech Republic. Many of his paintings were acquired by Archbishop Friedrich of Schwarzenberg and Bishop Jan Valerián Jirsík.

He died in Prague on 22 January 1880, after contracting typhoid fever from drinking well water that had been contaminated by a flood.

== Sources ==
- Brief biography from Světozor, Vol.21, 1887
- Brief biography from Zlatá Praha, Vol.4, 1886/87
- Brief biography from Zlatá Praha, Vol.1, 1864
