= Choltice =

- Market town
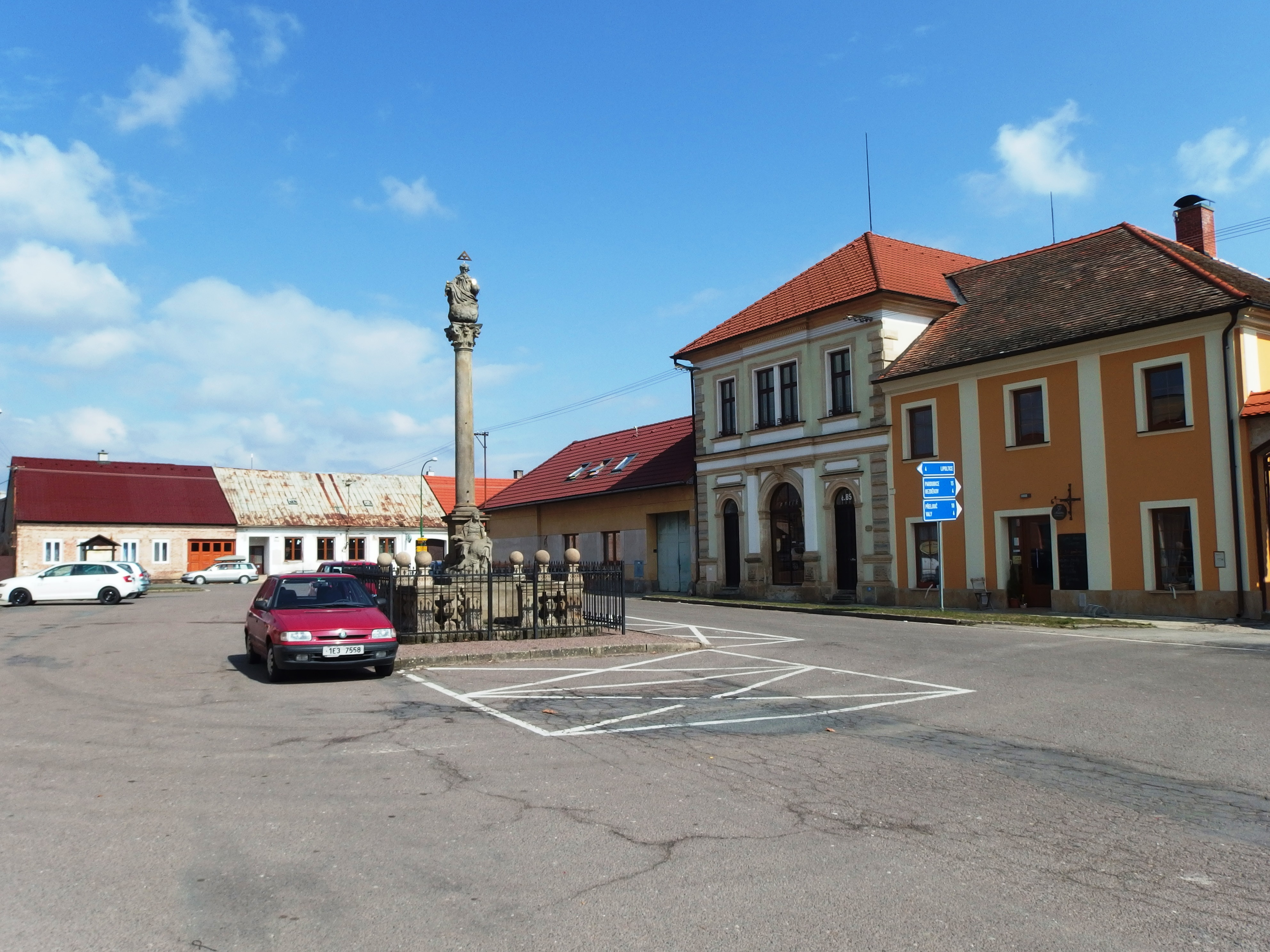
- Centre of Choltice

- Flag Coat of arms

- Location in the Czech Republic
- Coordinates: 49°59′16″N 15°37′10″E
- Country: Czech Republic
- Region: Pardubice
- District: Pardubice
- First mentioned: 1285

Area
  - Total: 9.89 km^{2} (3.82 sq mi)
- Elevation: 242 m (794 ft)

Population (2026-01-01)
  - Total: 1,244
  - Density: 126/km^{2} (326/sq mi)
- Time zone: UTC+1 (CET)
  - Summer (DST): UTC+2 (CEST)
- Postal codes: 533 61, 535 01
- Website: www.choltice.cz

Choltice (Czech pronunciation: [ˈxolcɪtsɛ]; German: Choltitz) is a market town in Pardubice District in the Pardubice Region of the Czech Republic. It has about 1,200 inhabitants.

== Administrative division ==
Choltice consists of three municipal parts (in brackets population according to the 2021 census):

- Choltice (1,101)
- Ledec (58)
- Podhorky (15)

== Etymology ==
The initial name of the village was Choletice. It was derived from the personal name Cholata, meaning "the village of Cholata's people".

== Geography ==
Choltice is located about 12 kilometres (7 mi) southwest of Pardubice. It lies on the border between the Svitavy Uplands and Iron Mountains, within the Polabí region. The Struha Stream flows through the market town. There is a system of fishponds built on the stream.

== History ==
The first written mention of Choltice is in a deed of King Wenceslaus II from 1285. The fortress in Choltice was first documented in 1397. Sometime between 1532 and 1541, the village was promoted to a market town. Until 1623, the owners of Choltice often changed and included various lesser noblemen. In 1623, Choltice was acquired by the Thun und Hohenstein family. Except for a short break in 1721–1731, they owned Choltice until the establishment of an independent municipality.

== Demographics ==
Historical population

Year	Pop.	±%
1869	1,020	—
1880	1,124	+10.2%
1890	1,105	−1.7%
1900	1,091	−1.3%
1910	1,080	−1.0%

Year	Pop.	±%
1921	1,060	−1.9%
1930	1,042	−1.7%
1950	943	−9.5%
1961	978	+3.7%
1970	936	−4.3%

Year	Pop.	±%
1980	955	+2.0%
1991	898	−6.0%
2001	909	+1.2%
2011	1,056	+16.2%
2021	1,174	+11.2%

Source: Censuses

== Transport ==
The railway line Přelouč–Heřmanův Městec runs through the municipal territory, however, the train stop named Choltice zastávka is located just behind the municipal border, in the territory of neighbouring Svinčany.

== Sights ==
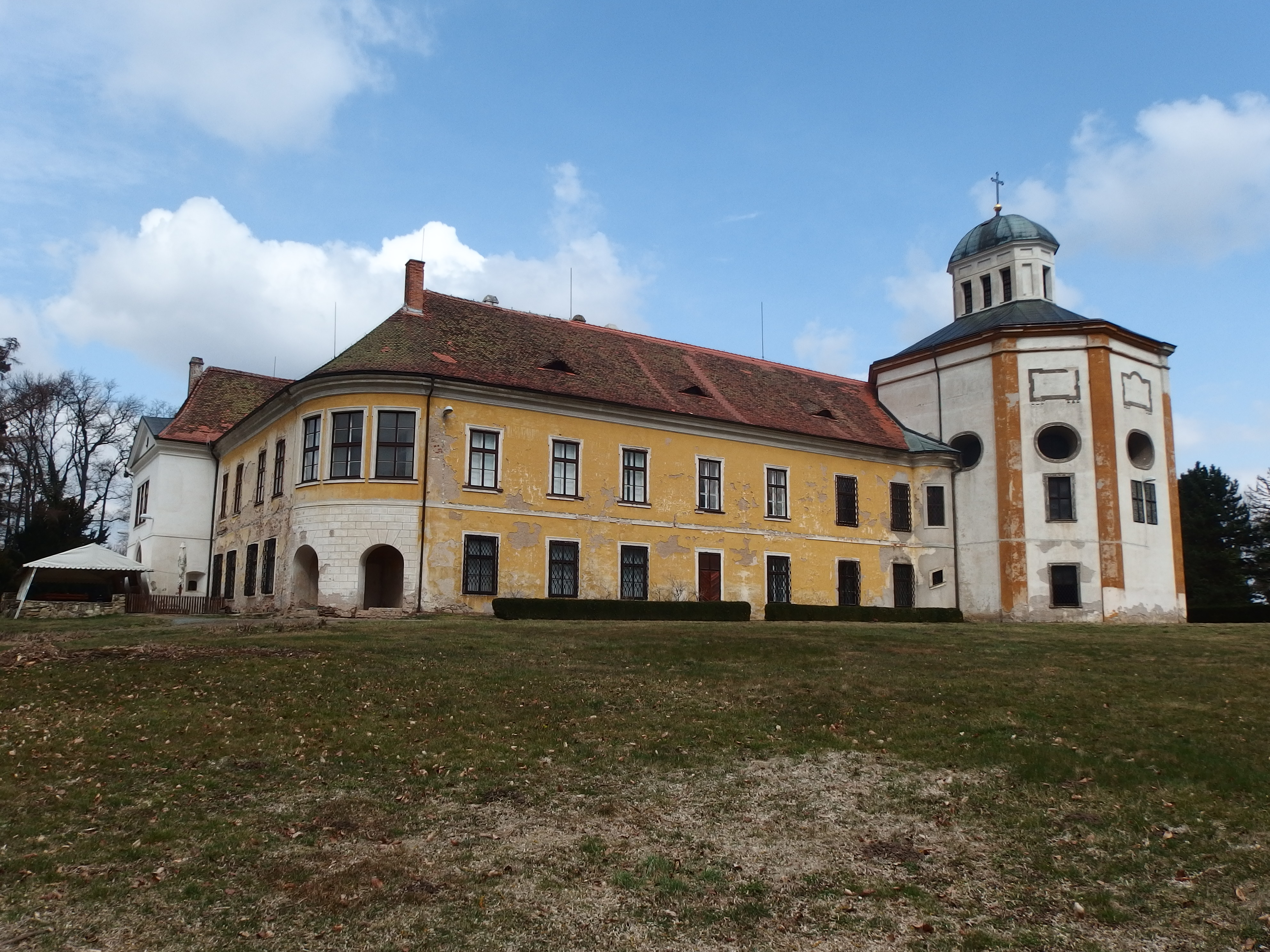
Choltice Castle

The main landmark is the Choltice Castle. It was originally a medieval fortress, rebuilt into a Renaissance castle in 1542–1570. In c. 1675–1700, the castle was rebuilt in the early Baroque style. The area with historically valuable buildings includes the Chapel of Saint Romedius, a court of honour with statues, farm facilities, a park and a garden with a gloriette. Today the castle is open to the public.

A cultural monument is the local wooden belfry. It is an unusual belfry, built in the Alpine style in 1863 by the Counts of Thun und Hohenstein.

In the cemetery is a Neo-Romanesque cemetery chapel that includes the family tomb of the Thun und Hohenstein family. It was built in 1872–1873.

== Notable people ==
- Josef Vojtěch Hellich (1807–1880), painter and archaeologist
- Olga Richterová (born 1985), politician; grew up here
