= Václav Beneš Třebízský =

Czech writer (1849–1884)

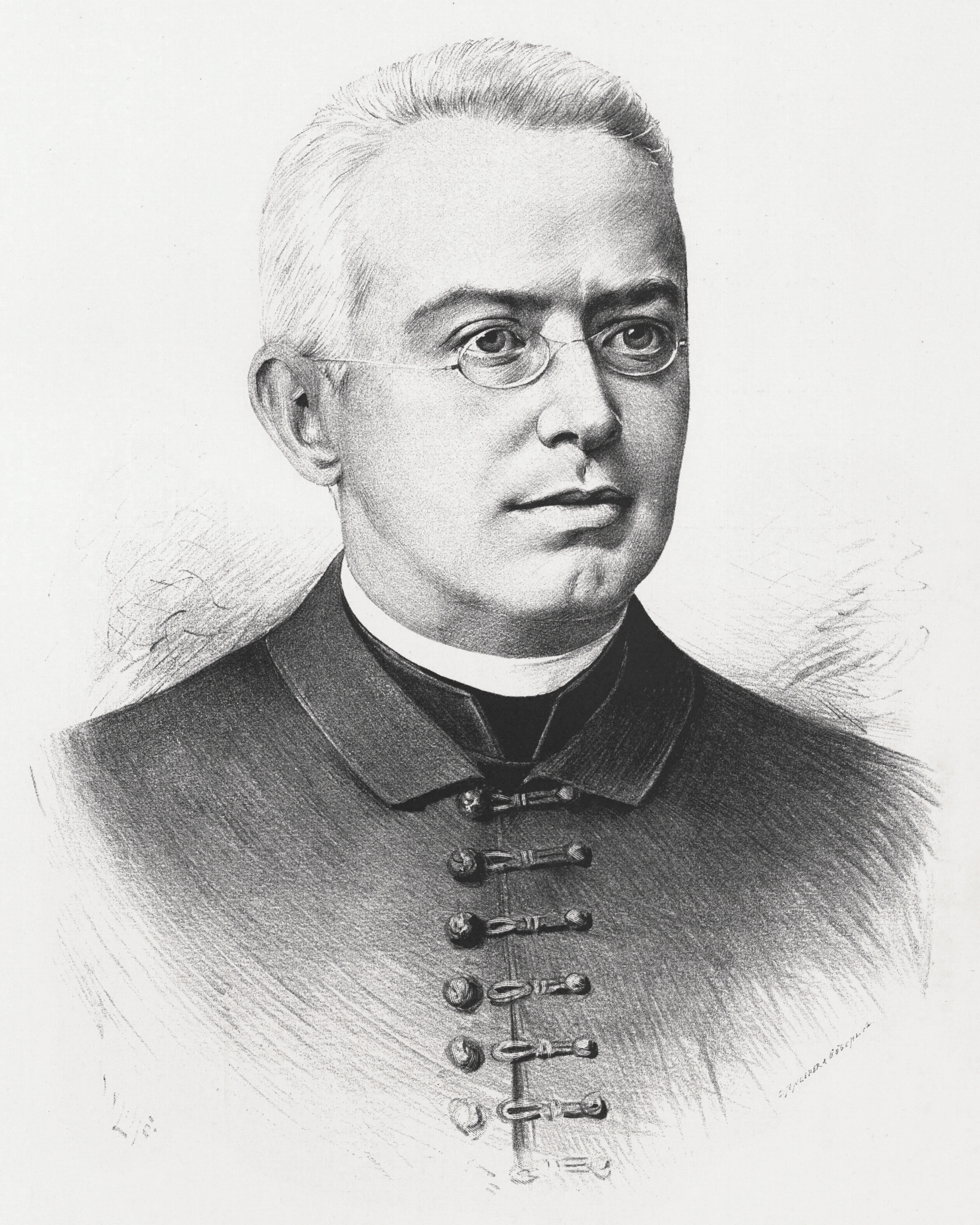
- Portrait of Beneš Třebízský by Jan Vilímek
- Born: Václav Beneš; 27 February 1849; Třebíz, Bohemia, Austrian Empire
- Died: 20 June 1884 (aged 35); Mariánské Lázně, Bohemia, Austria-Hungary
- Resting place: Vyšehrad Cemetery, Prague
- Occupation: Writer

Václav Beneš Třebízský (27 February 1849 – 20 June 1884) was a Czech priest and writer. Despite his short life, he was a very prolific author and was one of the most popular Czech writers of his time. He wrote mainly historical novels and short stories, but he also wrote several fairy tale books for children. The themes of his books supported Czech patriotism.

== Life ==
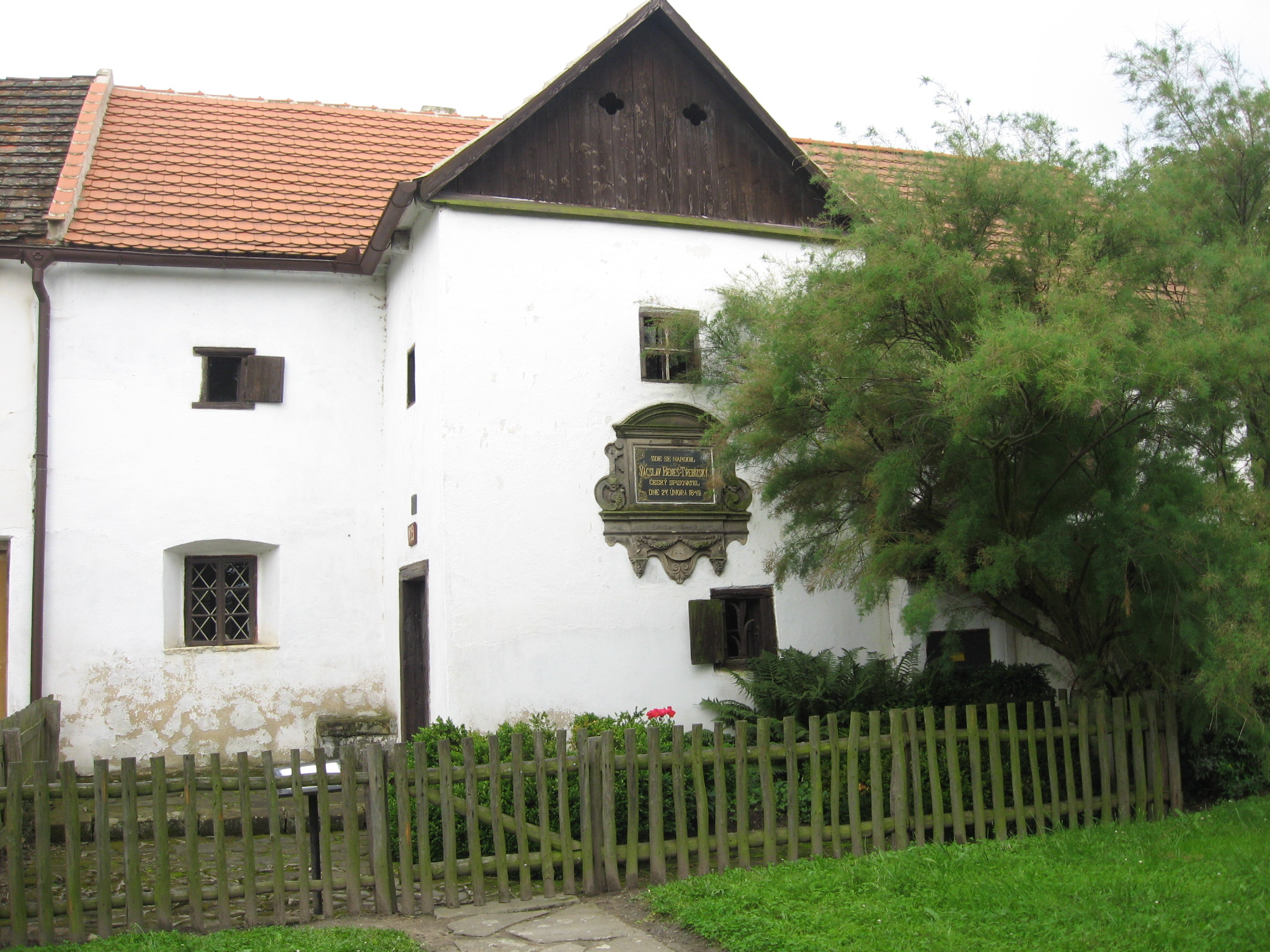
Birthplace of Václav Beneš Třebízský

Václav Beneš was born on 27 February 1849 in Třebíz in Bohemia, Austrian Empire, into a tailor's family. His father was a Czech patriot with an interest in history. Václav attended primary school in Kvílice and then the Piarist college in Slaný, where he had to walk 8 kilometres (5 mi), even though he was already suffering from tuberculosis of the lungs and joints at that time. He then studied theology at the Clementinum in Prague and learned other Slavic languages. During his studies, he began to create his first literary works and adopted the pseudonym Václav Beneš Třebízský to distinguish himself from the writer Václav Beneš Šumavský. Due to a worsening illness and treatment at the Teplice spa, he had to extend his studies by a year.

In 1873, he first underwent treatment at the spa in Mariánské Lázně. In 1875, Třebízský became a chaplain in Liteň. In 1876–1884, Třebízský was a chaplain in Klecany, where he wrote most of his major works. His health was still poor, and he recovered from pneumonia and pleurisy several times. Třebízský died of tuberculosis in on 20 June 1884 in Mariánské Lázně. He had a lavish funeral, attended by thousands of people. He was buried at the Vyšehrad Cemetery and a statue created by František Bílek was placed on the grave.

== Work ==
Beneš Třebízský was one of the most popular Czech writers of his time. His books strengthened the patriotic feelings of the nation and there was great interest in all of them. Despite his short life, he managed to write hundreds of short stories and novels. Many of his works are set in places where he lived. He was mainly interested in writing historical stories, which took place in various periods of Czech history but his favorite was the Hussite period. To a lesser extent, he also wrote fairy tales for children.

In addition to writing, Beneš Třebízský supported patriotism by translating liturgical texts into Czech, which until then existed only in Latin.

=== List of works ===
Třebízský's works include:

Novels

- Královna Dagmar
- Anežka Přemyslovna
- V podvečer pětilisté růže
- Bludné duše
- Trnová koruna
- Cyrilka na Hané

Collections of short stories

- V červáncích kalicha
- V záři kalicha
- Pod doškovými střechami
- Z různých dob
- Ze sázavských letopisů
- Z pověstí karlštejnského havrana
- Pobělohorské elegie
- Povídky starého zbrojnoše a jiné obrázky z naší minulosti

Faily tales

- Za dračí korunu
- Jak se stal Matěj Cvrček doktorem
- Krejčík králem
- Sudičky v Poohří

== Honours and legacy ==
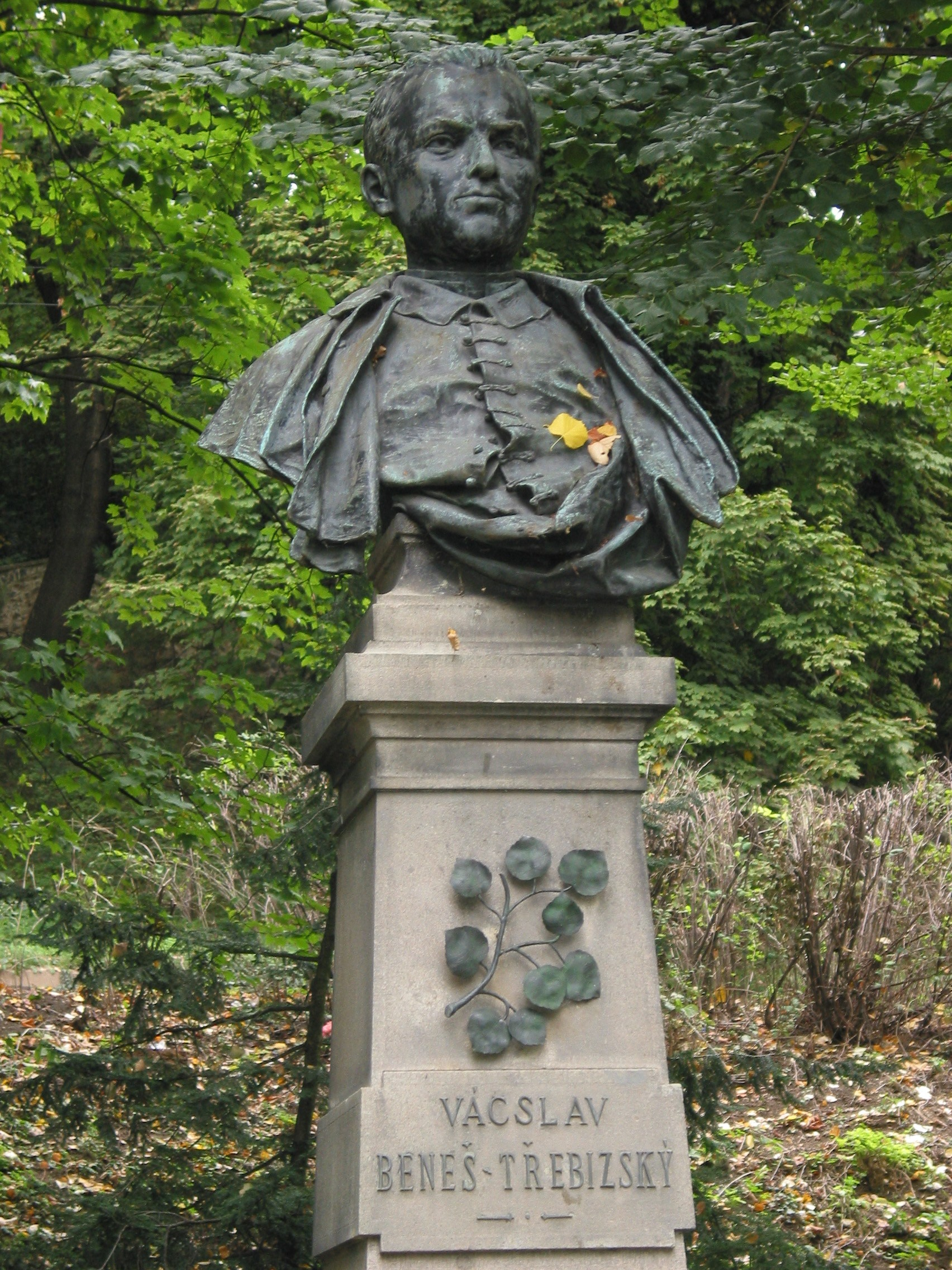
Memorial of Václav Beneš Třebízský in Klecany

The gymnasium in Slaný (formerly the Piarist college attended by Beneš Třebízský) bears the name of Václav Beneš Třebízský. It was named that way in 1938, when the current school building was built, but due to the upcoming World War II, the name only lasted a short time and was only restored in 1989.

In the former rectory in Klecany, where Beneš Třebízský lived and worked, there is a memorial hall of V. B. Třebízský with an exhibition about his life and work.

In his native village of Třebíž is the monument to V. B. Třebízský. It includes a seated statue of Beneš Třebízský, unveiled in 1892. In Klecany there is a monument with his bronze bust, which was created by Ladislav Šaloun in 1898. Both these monuments protected as cultural monuments.

There is a memorial plaque in the park in Mariánské Lázně, where Beneš Třebízský spent the last days of his life.

Dozens of cities and towns in the Czech Republic have a street named after Václav Beneš Třebízský, including Prague (Vinohrady), Brno, Ostrava, Plzeň, Liberec, Olomouc, České Budějovice and Hradec Králové.
