= František Čermák (painter) =

Czech painter

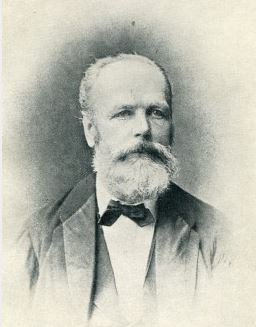
František Čermák

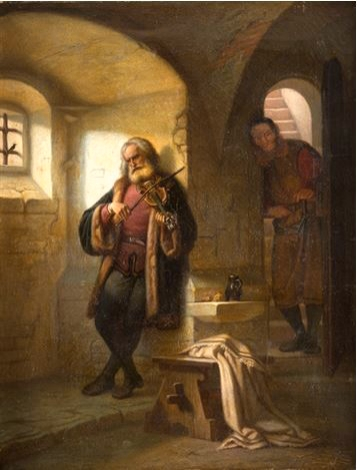
Dalibor in the Dungeon

František Čermák (5 September 1822, Prague – 4 May 1884, Prague) was a Czech painter, art professor and rector at the Academy of Fine Arts, Prague. He is primarily known for historical genre scenes.

== Life and work ==
From 1837 to 1842, he studied painting at the Academy of Fine Arts with Christian Ruben and František Tkadlík. This was followed by several study trips to Germany, Italy, Dalmatia, France and Belgium. He then spent a year studying figure drawing with Gustaf Wappers in Antwerp, after which he found a position in the studios of Thomas Couture in Paris.

When he returned to Prague, he was a professor at the academy from 1878 until his death; serving as Rector for the years 1881–1882. He was also a member of the creative artists' forum Umělecká beseda (roughly: Artistic discussion/words).

His best-known students included Soběslav Pinkas, Augustin Vlček, Karel Vítězslav Mašek, František Dvořák, Luděk Marold and Vojtěch Bartoněk.

He was heavily influenced by French/Belgian historical painting and produced numerous canvases designed to revive interest in Czech history. He also created altar paintings and scenes from his travels in Dalmatia.
