= Karel Vítězslav Mašek =

Czech painter (1865–1927)

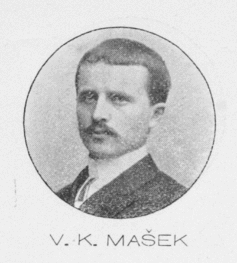
Karel Vítězslav Mašek, from Zlatá Praha (1903)

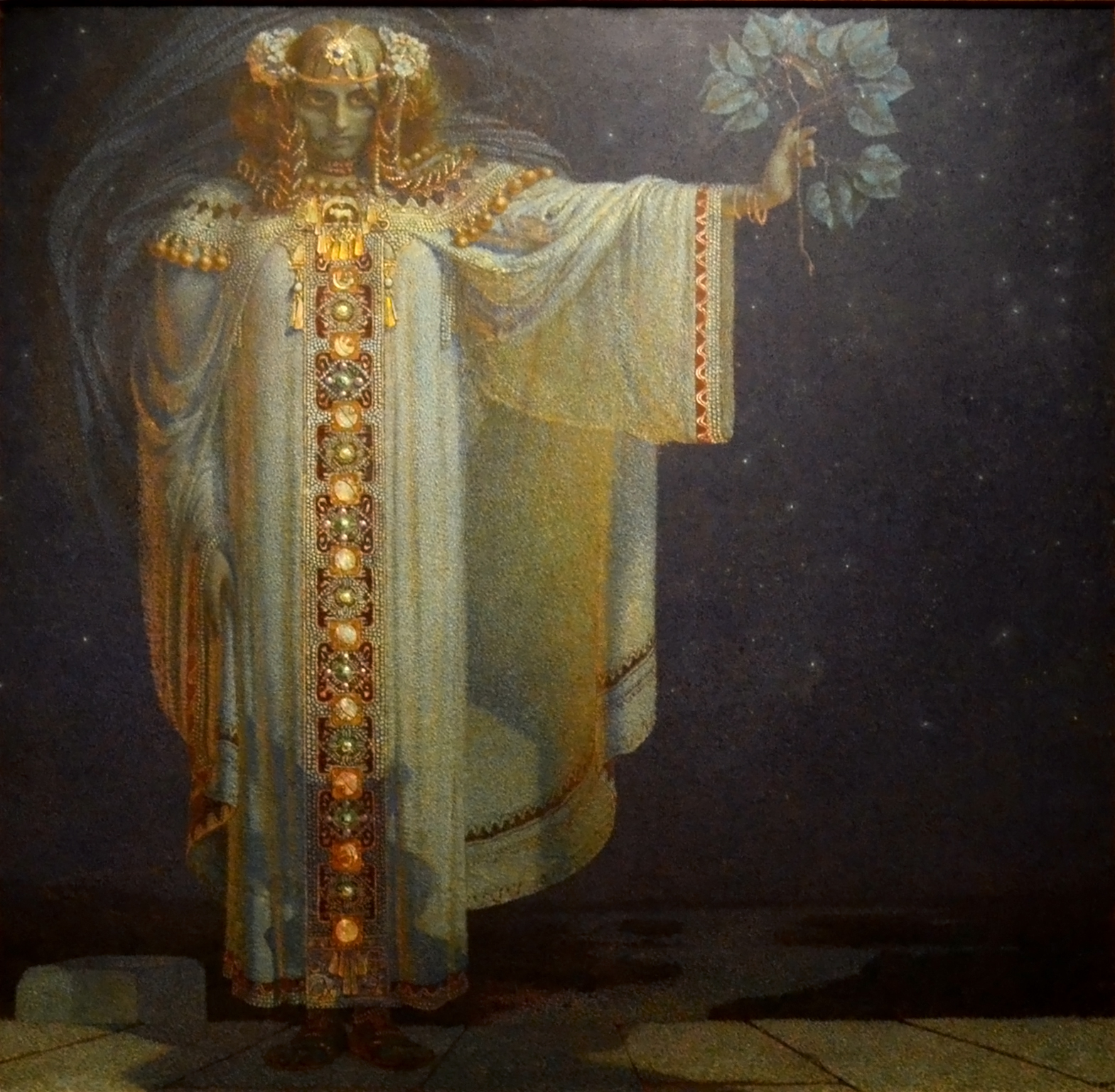
Libuše (1893)

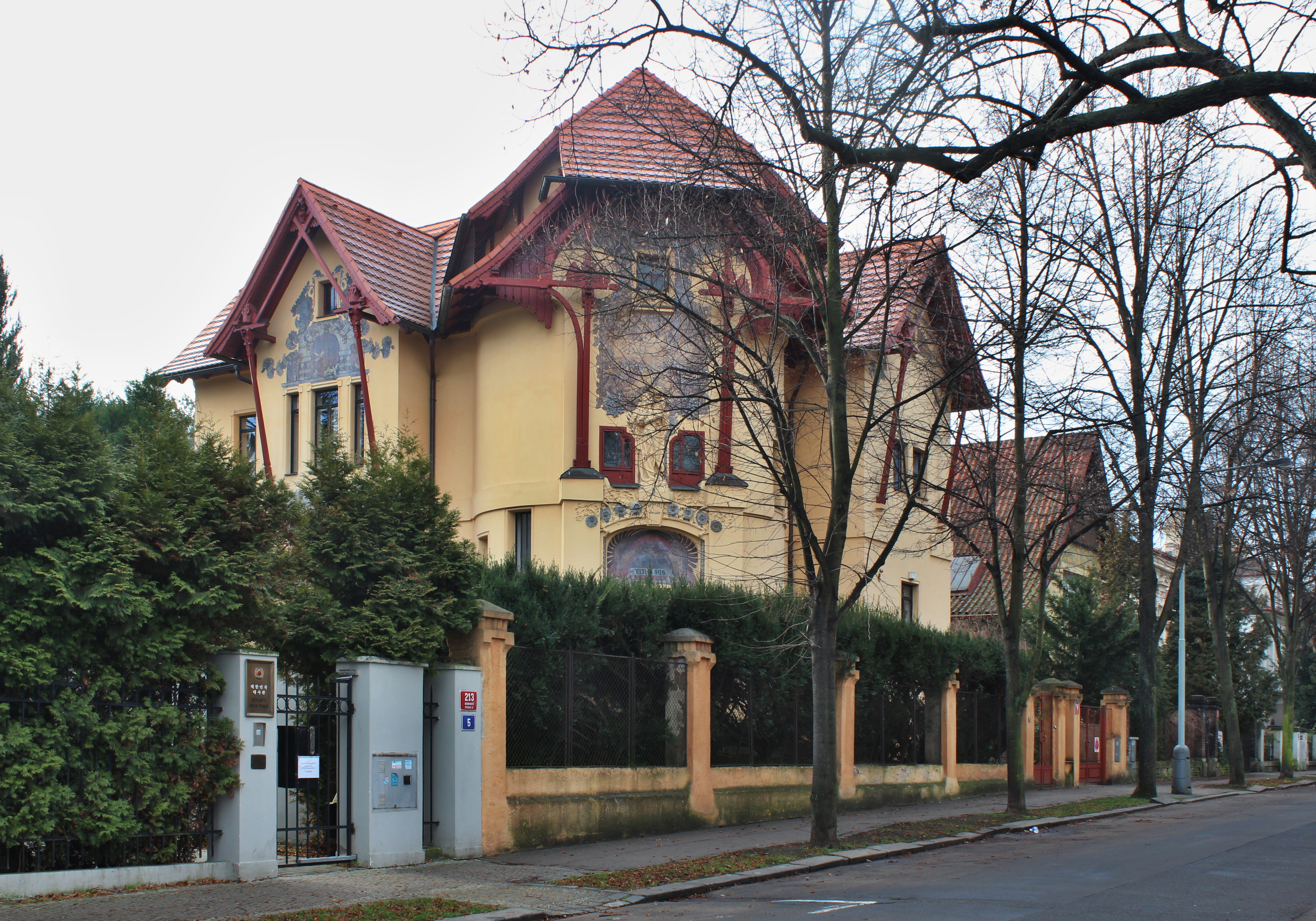
Slavíčkova, his villa in Bubeneč

Karel Vítězslav Mašek (1 September 1865, Prague - 24 July 1927, Prague) was a Czech painter, architect, illustrator and art professor.

== Life ==
He studied briefly at the Academy of Fine Arts, Prague with Antonín Lhota then, in 1884, transferred to the Academy of Fine Arts, Munich where he was a member of "Škréta" (Orcs), a Czech young artists' association, and studied with Alexander von Wagner.

In 1887, he accompanied Alfons Mucha and František Dvořák to Paris, studying at the Académie Julian with Gustave Boulanger and Jules Lefebvre. It was there that he became acquainted with pointillism. He returned to Prague in 1888 and two years later joined the "Krasoumná jednota", or "Kunstverein für Böhmen" (Fine Arts Unit), an association which included many members of the Czech nobility who were devoted to the promotion of art.

From 1898, he was a professor at the Academy of Arts, Architecture and Design in Prague. Josef Čapek is, perhaps, his best-known student. He was also interested in architecture and designed his own villa in 1901. In his later years, he was involved in engineering issues related to the growth of Prague and its agglomeration with neighboring towns.
