= Jan Vilímek =

Czech illustrator and painter (1860–1938)

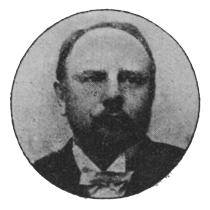
Vilímek, from Zlatá Praha (issue of 16 January 1903)

Jan Vilímek (German: Johann Vilímek; 1 January 1860 – 15 April 1938) was a Czech illustrator and painter.

== Life ==
Vilímek was born on 1 January 1860 in Žamberk, Bohemia, Austrian Empire. He created many portraits of famous personalities from Bohemia and other Slavic nations. During the 1880s, these portraits were regularly published in magazines such as Humoristické listy, Zlatá Praha and Světozor. In the 1890s, some of these illustrations were assembled into a book, České album. He died on 15 April 1938 in Vienna.

== Gallery ==
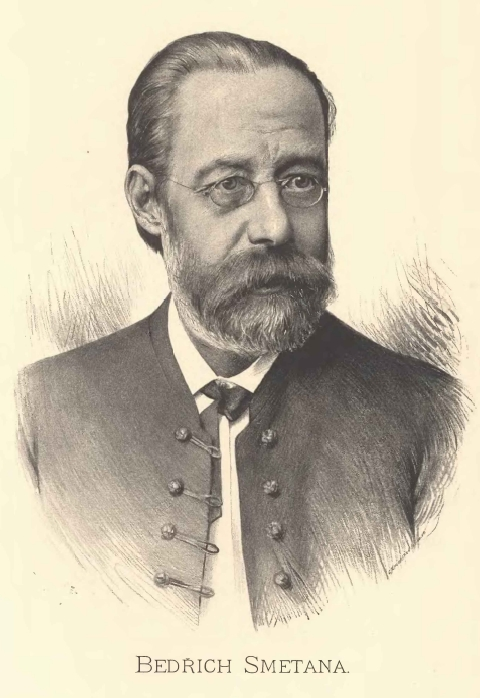
Bedřich Smetana

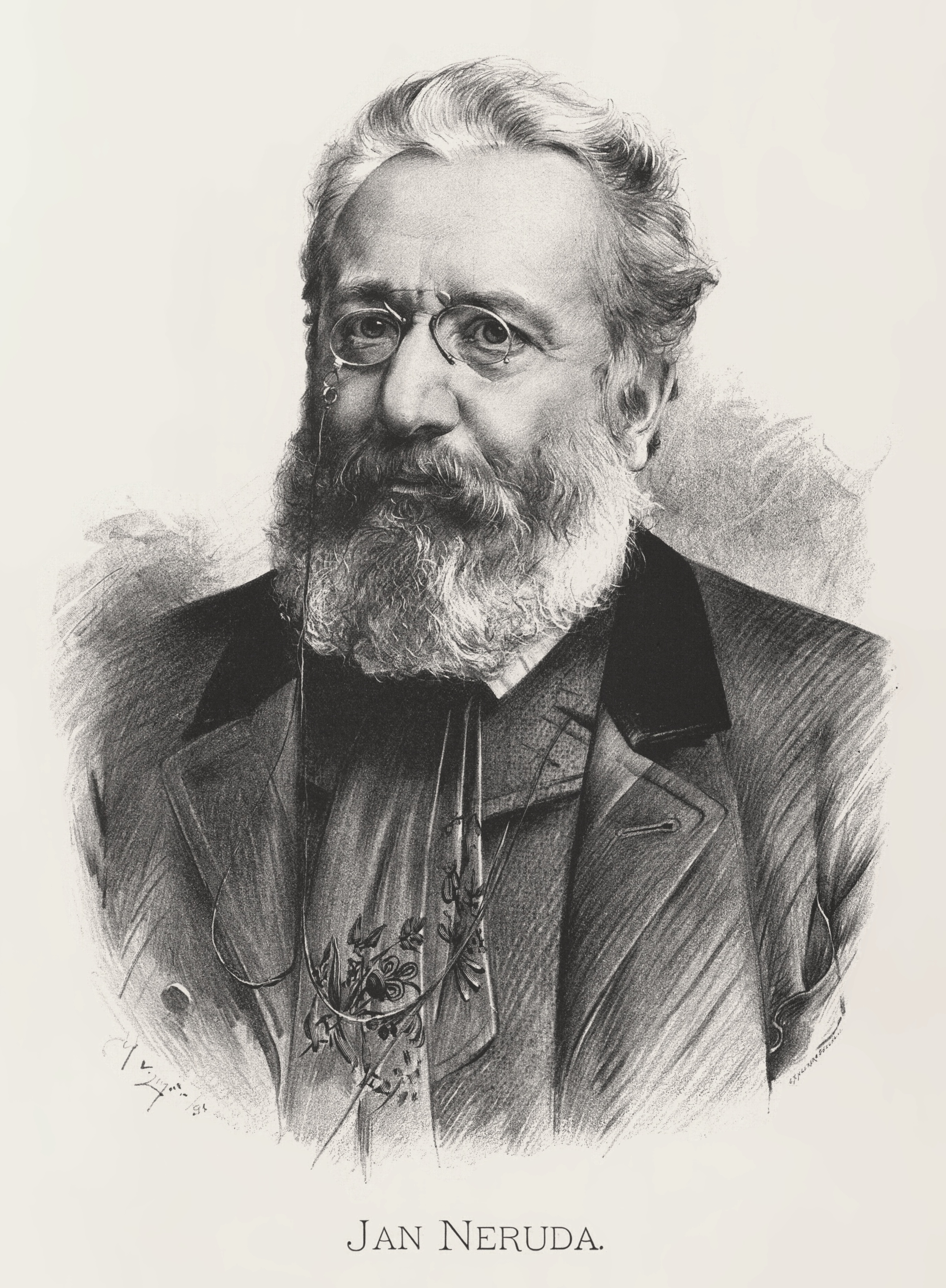
Jan Neruda

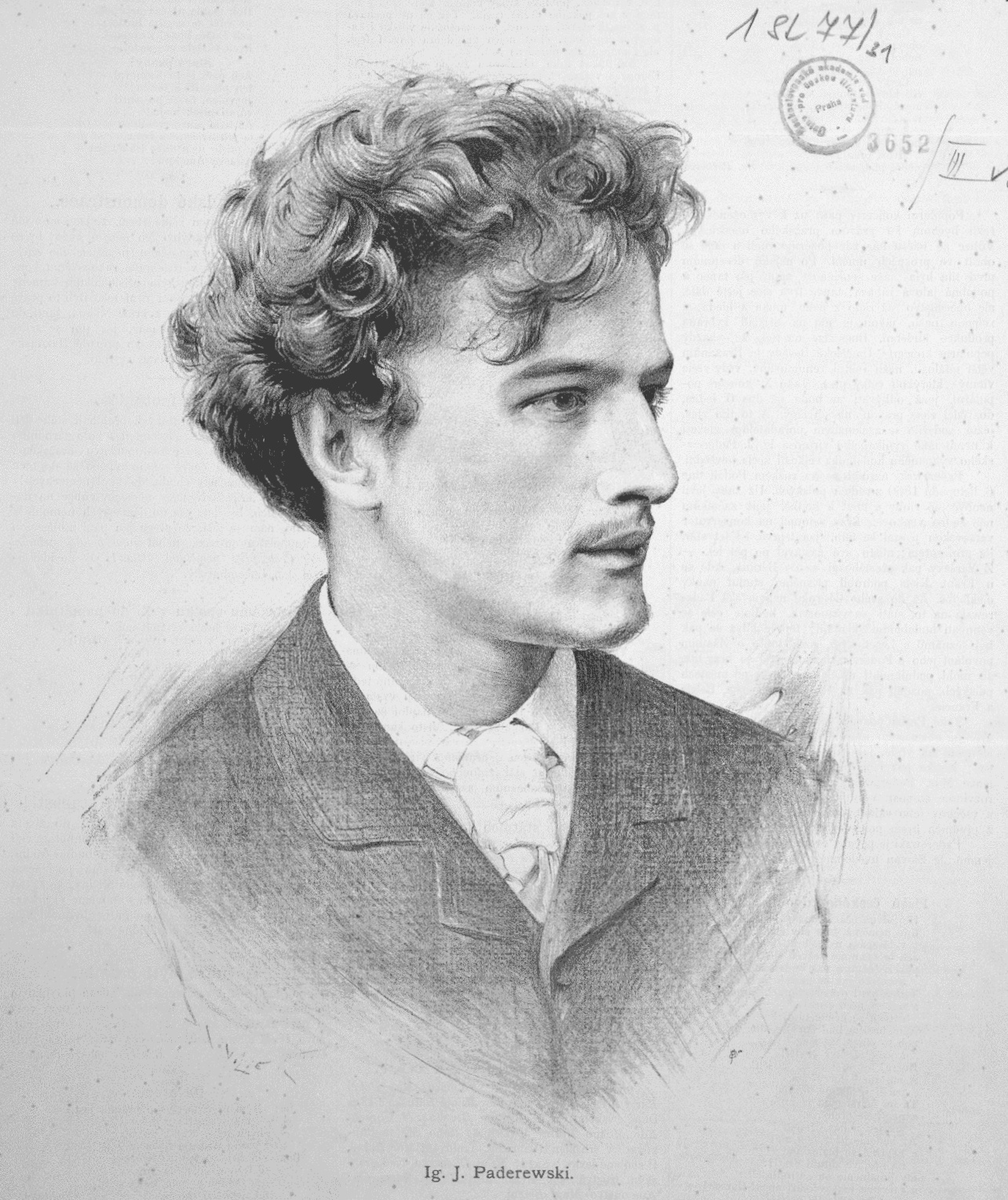
Ignacy Jan Paderewski

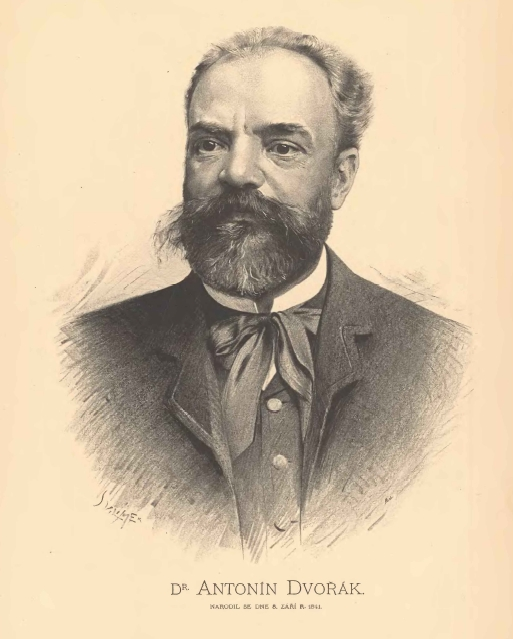
Antonín Dvořák
