= Třebíz =

- Municipality
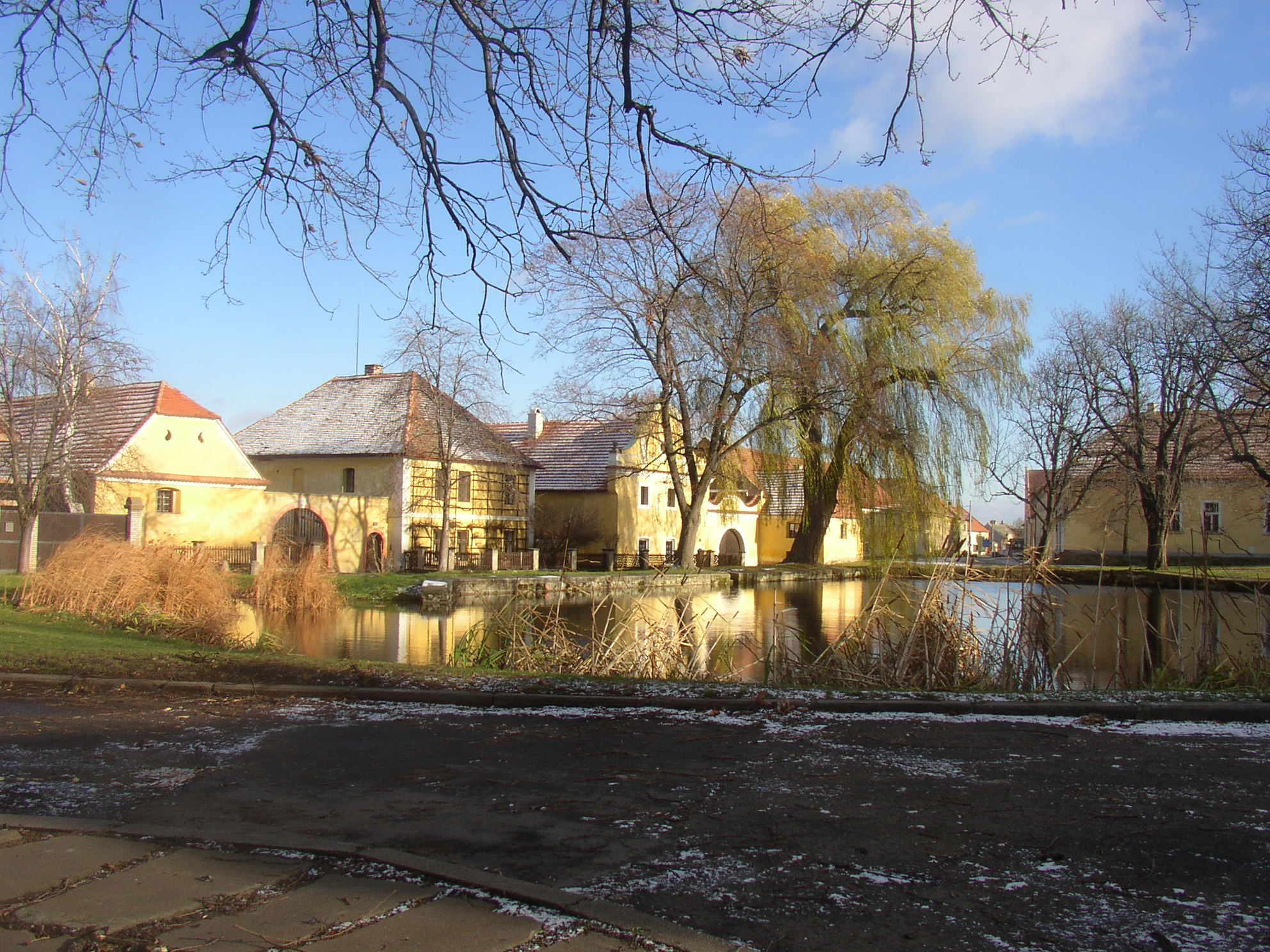
- Centre of Třebíz

- Location in the Czech Republic
- Coordinates: 50°16′11″N 13°59′27″E
- Country: Czech Republic
- Region: Central Bohemian
- District: Kladno
- First mentioned: 1183

Area
  - Total: 4.85 km^{2} (1.87 sq mi)
- Elevation: 308 m (1,010 ft)

Population (2026-01-01)
  - Total: 230
  - Density: 47/km^{2} (120/sq mi)
- Time zone: UTC+1 (CET)
  - Summer (DST): UTC+2 (CEST)
- Postal code: 273 75
- Website: www.trebiz.cz

Třebíz is a municipality and village in Kladno District in the Central Bohemian Region of the Czech Republic. It has about 200 inhabitants.

== Demographics ==
Historical population
Year	Pop.	±%
1869	303	—
1880	286	−5.6%
1890	293	+2.4%
1900	321	+9.6%
1910	349	+8.7%
1921	366	+4.9%
1930	389	+6.3%
1950	228	−41.4%
1961	236	+3.5%
1970	209	−11.4%
1980	191	−8.6%
1991	161	−15.7%
2001	173	+7.5%
2011	213	+23.1%
2021	226	+6.1%
Source: Censuses

== Notable people ==
- Václav Beneš Třebízský (1849–1884), writer
