= Jan Otto =

Czech publisher (1841–1916)

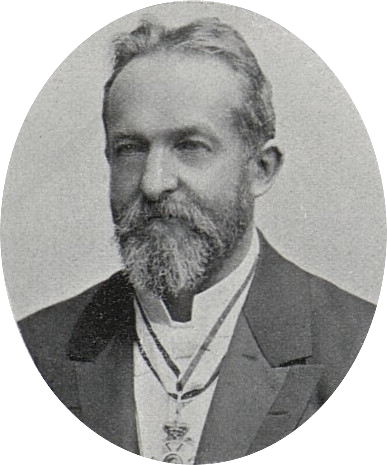
- Otto in 1907
- Born: 8 November 1841; Přibyslav, Bohemia, Austrian Empire
- Died: 29 May 1916 (aged 74); Prague, Bohemia, Austria-Hungary
- Occupation: Publisher
- Known for: Otto's encyclopedia

Jan Otto (8 November 1841 – 29 May 1916) was a Czech publisher and bookseller. He is best known for Otto's encyclopedia, the largest encyclopedia published in Czech.

== Life and work ==
Jan Otto was born on 8 November 1841 in Přibyslav. He was the son of a country doctor. In 1862 he began working as a printer. In 1871, he took over the printing press from his father-in-law Jaroslav Pospíšil. In 1874 he opened a bookstore on Wenceslaus Square in Prague, but after 1910, he concentrated on publishing. After his death his son and son-in-law took over the company but after lasting troubles, went bankrupt in 1934.

In the 1880s he started to work on publishing a complete encyclopedia in Czech. Despite many difficulties, he began publication 1888. It was an immediate commercial success, and publishing continued twenty years.

In addition to the encyclopedia, he published other successful volumes. Ottova světová knihovna (Otto's world library) and Světová četba (World's reading), containing some 2,000 passages translated into Czech. Laciná knihovna národní was a series of affordable but quality books from Czech authors. He also published collections of several authors, Brehm's Life of Animals, and literary newspapers such as Lumír, Zlatá Praha and Světozor. He was active in social and political life of Prague society. In 1912, he was appointed a member of the Austrian House of Lords.

Otto died on 29 May 1916 in Prague.
