= František Dvořák (painter) =

Czech painter (1862–1927)

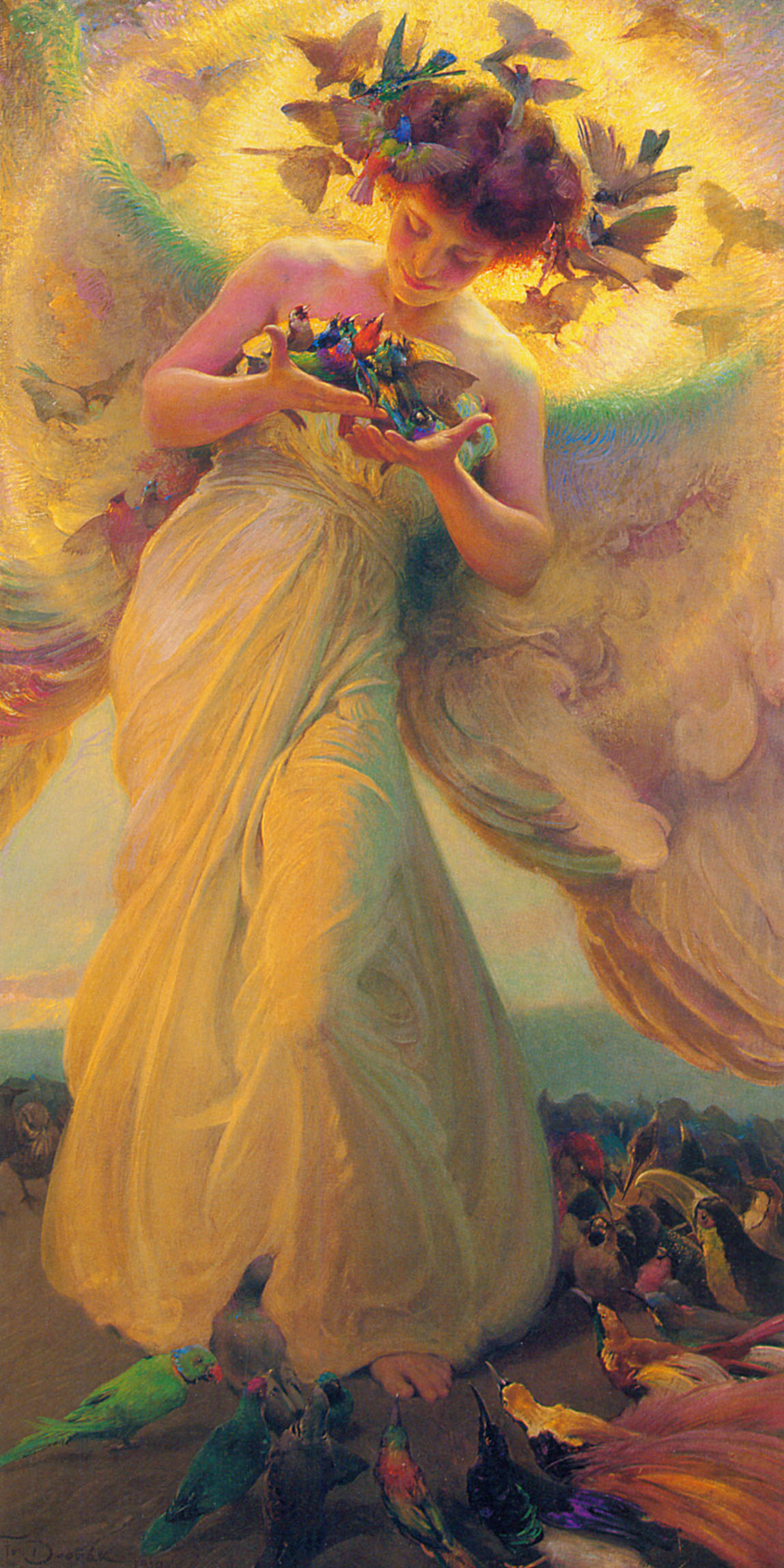
The Angel of the Birds (1910)

František Dvořák, born Bruner, also known as Franz Dvorak or Franz Bruner (14 November 1862, Přelouč - 7 June 1927, Prague) was a Czech painter.

== Life and work ==
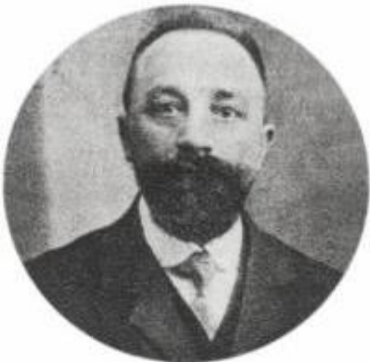
František Dvořák (date unknown)

He was the son of a tailor named Václav Bruner. He later changed his name to "Dvořák", possibly for patriotic reasons. He displayed artistic talent from an early age, and when he was fourteen his father sent him to the pedagogical institute in Kutná Hora. At the age of seventeen, his desire for an artistic career led him to the Academy of Fine Arts, Prague, where he studied with František Čermák. However, feeling that his studies were progressing too slowly, he switched to the Academy of Fine Arts Vienna, where his teachers were Christian Griepenkerl and Carl Wurzinger.

In 1883, he moved to the Munich Academy of Fine Arts, becoming a student of Otto Seitz and Wilhelm von Lindenschmit the Younger. Later, he was able to purchase a studio in the Schwabing district, painting portraits and genre scenes. As his popularity increased, he began to exhibit in Berlin and Vienna.

In 1888, ever restless, he joined with fellow painters Karel Vítězslav Mašek and Alfons Mucha on a trip to France, then went on to Italy where he painted portraits for English and American visitors. His contact with Americans piqued his interest, so he went to the United States, settling in Philadelphia. He had his first large exhibition in 1890, followed by shows in New York, Chicago and Detroit, and was personally invited to the Walker Art Gallery in Liverpool for a world exposition.

In 1905, he returned to Prague, establishing a home and studio on the riverside where he lived until his death. During his stay in the United States, he had come into contact with the New Spirituality and attempted to integrate Eastern spirituality into his paintings. He also did portraits of Ramakrishna and Sarada Devi. His interests influenced his sister Helena, who translated several occult classics into Czech. For much of his life, he was better known abroad than at home. His first major exhibition in Prague did not come until 1907.

== Selected paintings ==
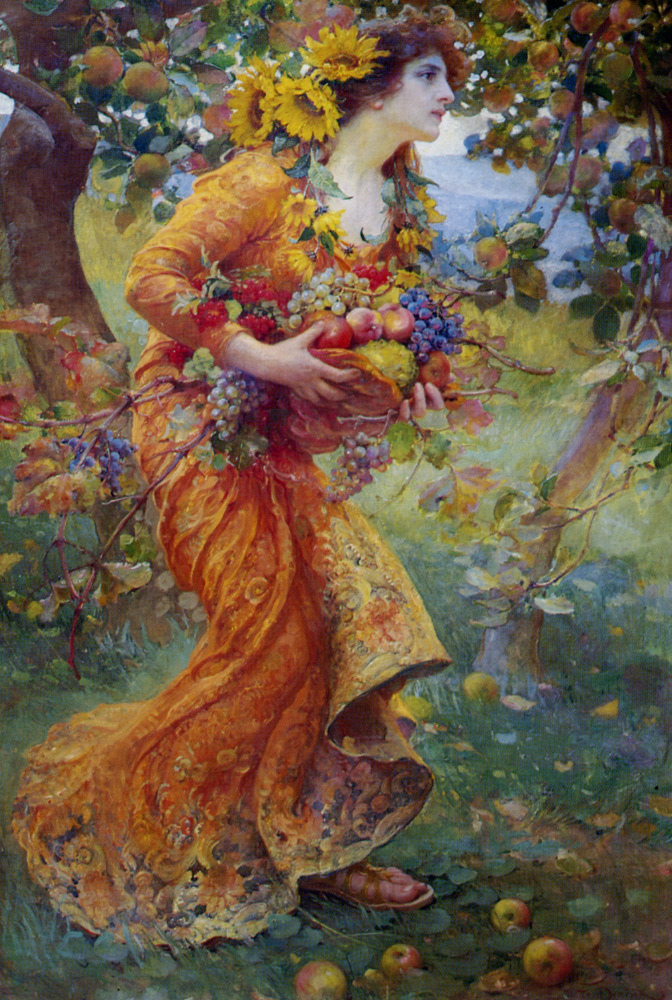
In the Orchard (1912)

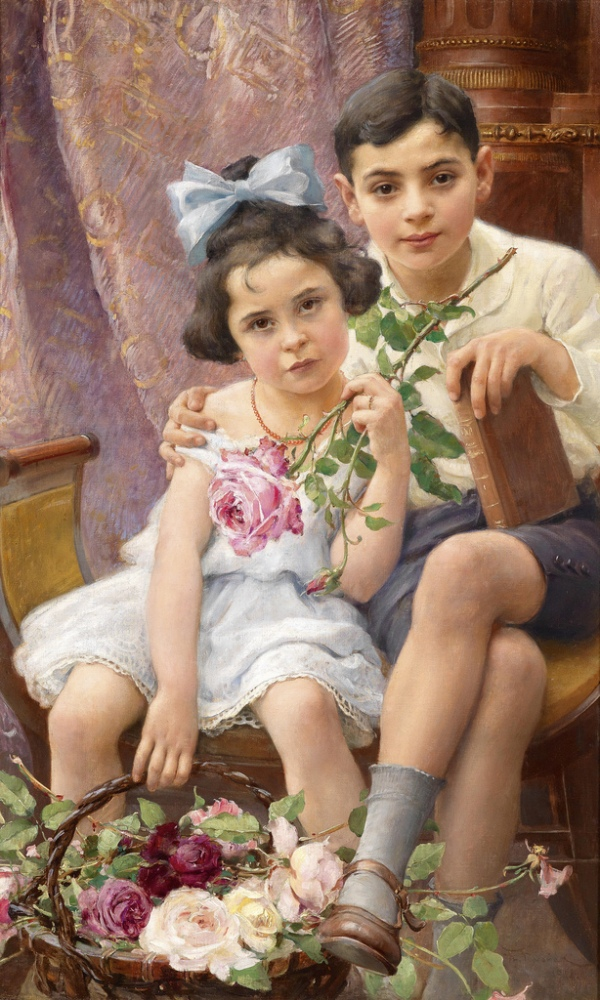
The Siblings (1912)

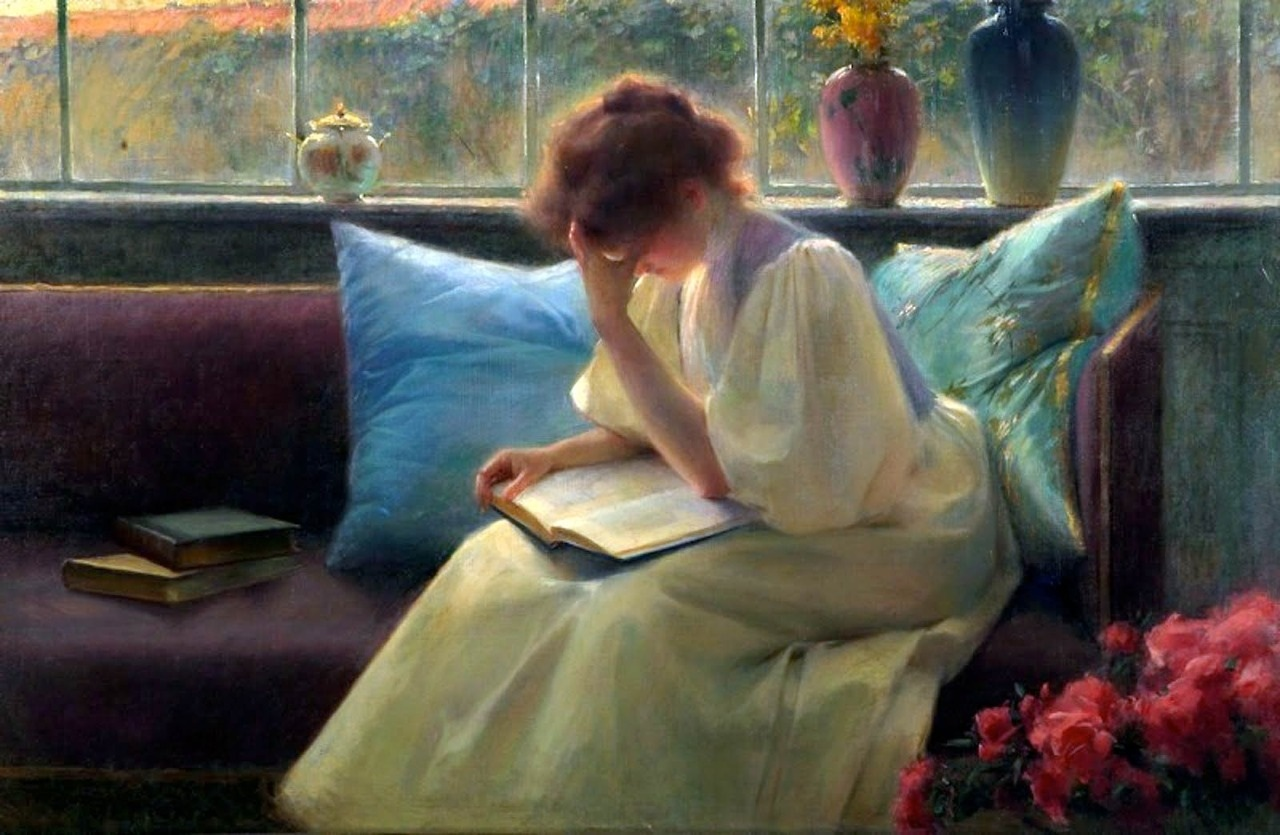
Reader (1906)

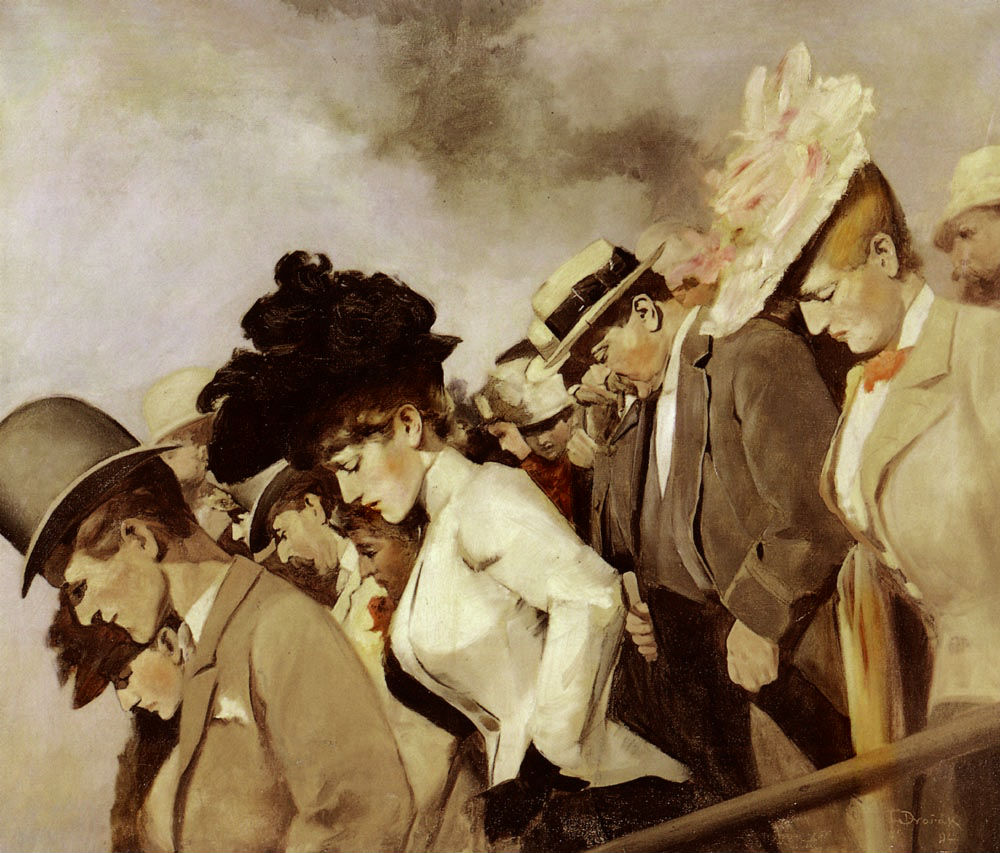
At the Races (1892)
