= Svinčany =

- Municipality
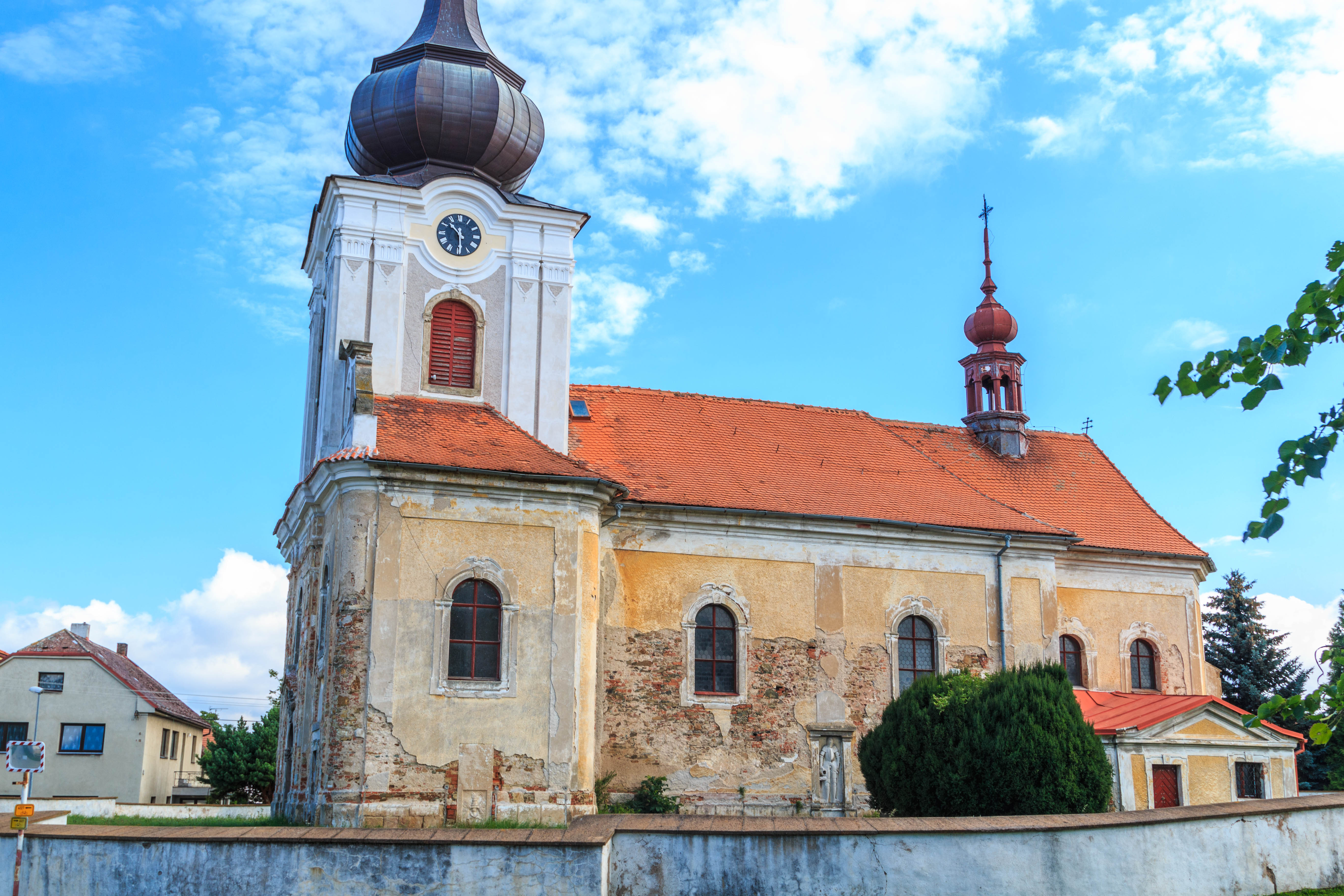
- Church of Saint Lawrence

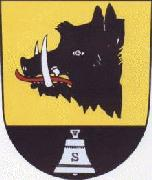
- Flag Coat of arms

- Location in the Czech Republic
- Coordinates: 49°58′36″N 15°38′22″E
- Country: Czech Republic
- Region: Pardubice
- District: Pardubice
- First mentioned: 1226

Area
  - Total: 8.19 km^{2} (3.16 sq mi)
- Elevation: 260 m (850 ft)

Population (2026-01-01)
  - Total: 568
  - Density: 69.4/km^{2} (180/sq mi)
- Time zone: UTC+1 (CET)
  - Summer (DST): UTC+2 (CEST)
- Postal code: 535 01
- Website: www.svincany.cz

Svinčany is a municipality and village in Pardubice District in the Pardubice Region of the Czech Republic. It has about 600 inhabitants.

== Administrative division ==
Svinčany consists of three municipal parts (in brackets population according to the 2021 census):

- Svinčany (378)
- Dolní Raškovice (59)
- Horní Raškovice (59)

== Demographics ==
Historical population
Year	Pop.	±%
1869	722	—
1880	802	+11.1%
1890	872	+8.7%
1900	917	+5.2%
1910	899	−2.0%
1921	857	−4.7%
1930	860	+0.4%
1950	607	−29.4%
1961	576	−5.1%
1970	501	−13.0%
1980	428	−14.6%
1991	380	−11.2%
2001	370	−2.6%
2011	421	+13.8%
2021	496	+17.8%
Source: Censuses
