= Antonín Lhota =

Czech painter and art teacher

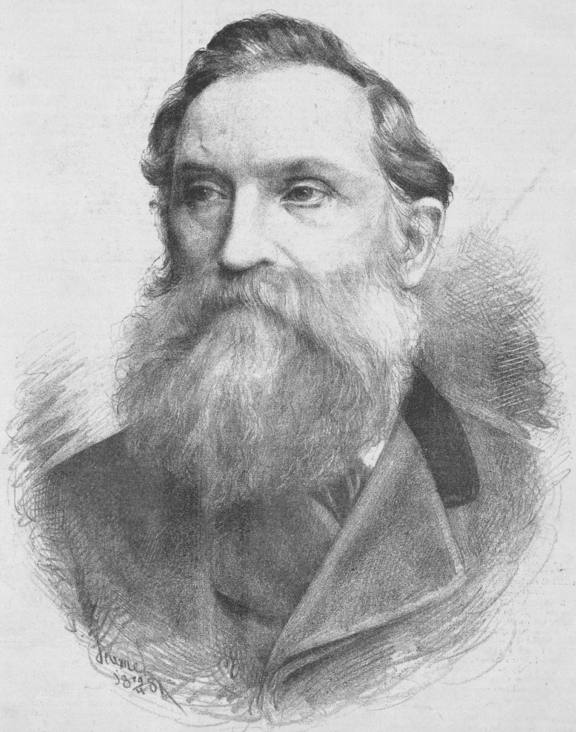
Antonín Lhota (1881), drawing by Jan Vilímek

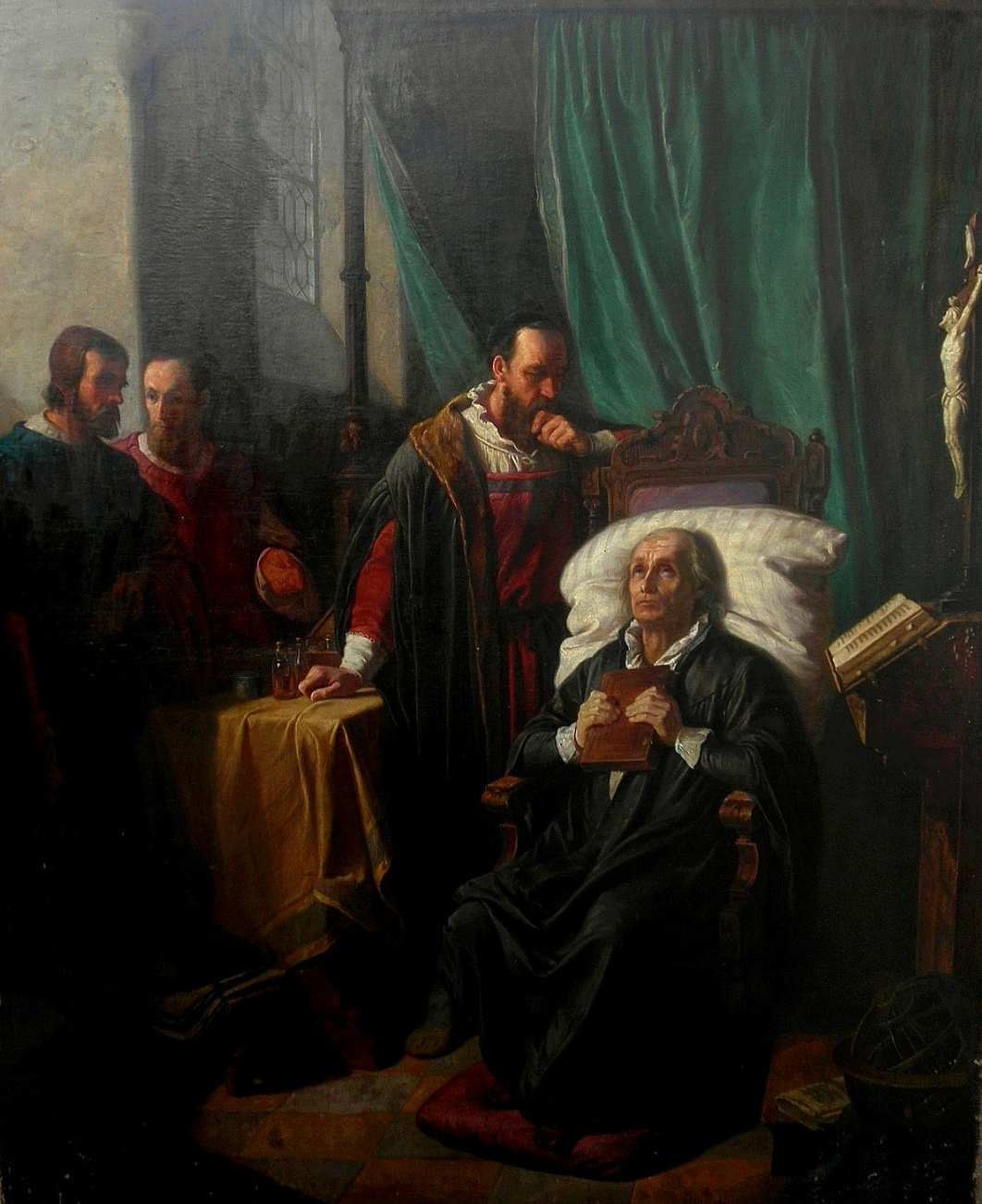
Copernicus, Dying (1856)

Antonín Lhota (2 January 1812, Kutná Hora – 10 September 1905, Volyně) was a Czech painter and art teacher.

== Life and work ==
He studied at the Prague Academy of Fine Arts under František Kristian Waldherr and František Tkadlík. After further studies in Munich and Vienna, he returned to the academy in 1844, where he was employed for ten years, proofreading lectures and serving as an assistant teacher. This was followed by a multi-year study trip to Italy and Paris which included participation in the Exposition Universelle (1855). In 1867, he became a professor at the academy in Prague and was promoted to Rector upon the death of Jan Swerts (1879).

He specialized in history painting, secular and religious, primarily on Czech subjects. He was active as a painter well into his seventies, when he painted murals at the Home for the Blind in Mala Strana. He retired at the age of seventy-five and went to live with his son, Emil, who ran an industrial school in Volyně. His other son, Augustin, was a drawing teacher in Rakovník.

Apart from his own works, he taught an entire generation of Czech painters, including Václav Brožík, František Ženíšek, Mikoláš Aleš, Jakub Schikaneder, Maximilian Pirner, Josef Václav Myslbek and others. From 1872, he also served as an examiner for teacher candidates in the Czech and Moravian elementary schools.

At the time of his ninetieth birthday in 1902, he was the oldest living Czech painter. By then, his painting style was considered somewhat obsolete as it focused on composition and detail, but neglected the psychological element. His most lasting contribution may be the joy for painting he instilled in the artists of the next generation.
