= Klecany =

- Town
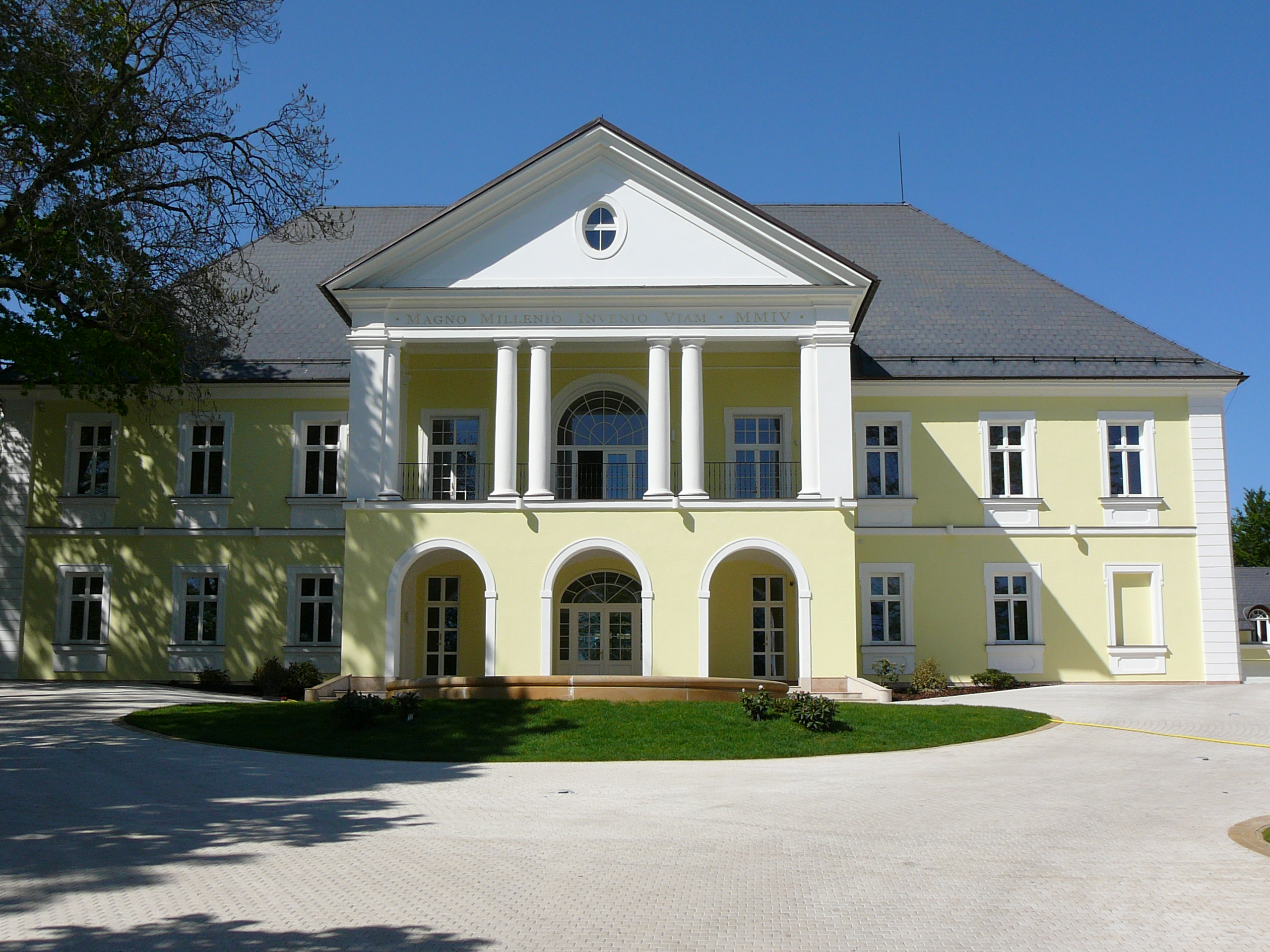
- Klecany Castle

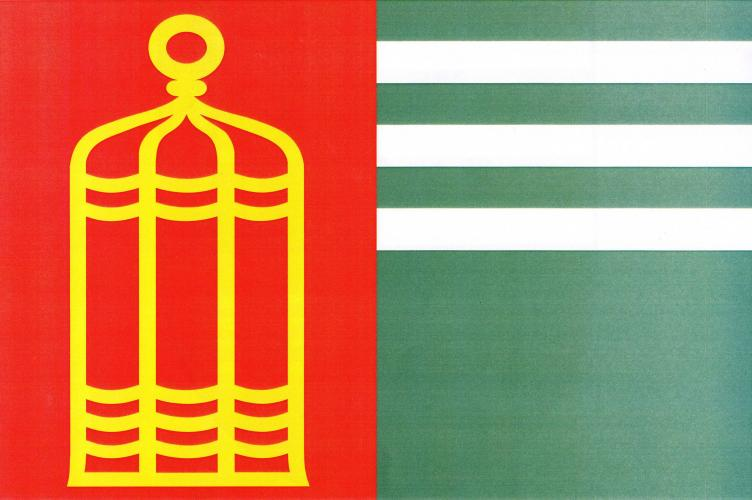
- Flag Coat of arms

- Location in the Czech Republic
- Coordinates: 50°10′30″N 14°25′0″E
- Country: Czech Republic
- Region: Central Bohemian
- District: Prague-East
- First mentioned: 1316

Government
  - Mayor: Daniel Dvořák

Area
  - Total: 10.16 km^{2} (3.92 sq mi)
- Elevation: 265 m (869 ft)

Population (2026-01-01)
  - Total: 3,997
  - Density: 393.4/km^{2} (1,019/sq mi)
- Time zone: UTC+1 (CET)
  - Summer (DST): UTC+2 (CEST)
- Postal code: 250 67
- Website: www.mu-klecany.cz

Klecany (Czech pronunciation: [ˈklɛtsanɪ]) is a town in Prague-East District in the Central Bohemian Region of the Czech Republic. It has about 4,000 inhabitants. The town is located on the Vltava River in the Prague Plateau. Klecany was founded in the 14th century at the latest, but it became a town only in 1994.

== Administrative division ==
Klecany consists of four municipal parts (in brackets population according to the 2021 census):

- Klecany (3,477)
- Drasty (63)
- Klecánky (211)
- Zdibsko (6)

== Etymology ==
According to the most probable theory, the name is derived from the Czech word klec (i.e. 'cage') and refers to the fact that people who lived here had the duty of making falconry cages for the king.

== Geography ==
Klecany is located about 5 kilometres (3 mi) north of Prague. It lies in the Prague Plateau, on the right bank of the Vltava River. The highest point is at 300 m (984 ft) above sea level.

== History ==
The first written mention of Klecany is from 1316. In 1507, it was promoted to a market town by King Vladislaus II. Among the notable owners of Klecany were members of the noble families of Lobkowicz, Trautmannsdorf, Sternberg and Clam-Gallas.

In 1994, Klecany obtained the title of a town.

== Demographics ==
Historical population

Year	Pop.	±%
1869	958	—
1880	1,055	+10.1%
1890	1,146	+8.6%
1900	1,266	+10.5%
1910	1,337	+5.6%

Year	Pop.	±%
1921	1,332	−0.4%
1930	1,760	+32.1%
1950	1,676	−4.8%
1961	2,004	+19.6%
1970	2,146	+7.1%

Year	Pop.	±%
1980	2,081	−3.0%
1991	1,924	−7.5%
2001	1,958	+1.8%
2011	3,142	+60.5%
2021	3,757	+19.6%

Source: Censuses

== Transport ==
The D8 motorway from Prague to Ústí nad Labem (part of the European route E55) runs through the eastern part of the municipal territory.

== Sights ==
The main landmark of Klecany is the Klecany Castle. After it was destroyed by fire, it was rebuilt to its current neo-Empire form in 1924. Today the castle is privately owned and inaccessible to the public.

In Drasty is a valuable barnyard from the turn of the 18th and 19th centuries.

== Notable people ==
- Václav Beneš Třebízský (1849–1884), writer; worked here as a chaplain in 1876–1884
