= Děčany =

- Municipality
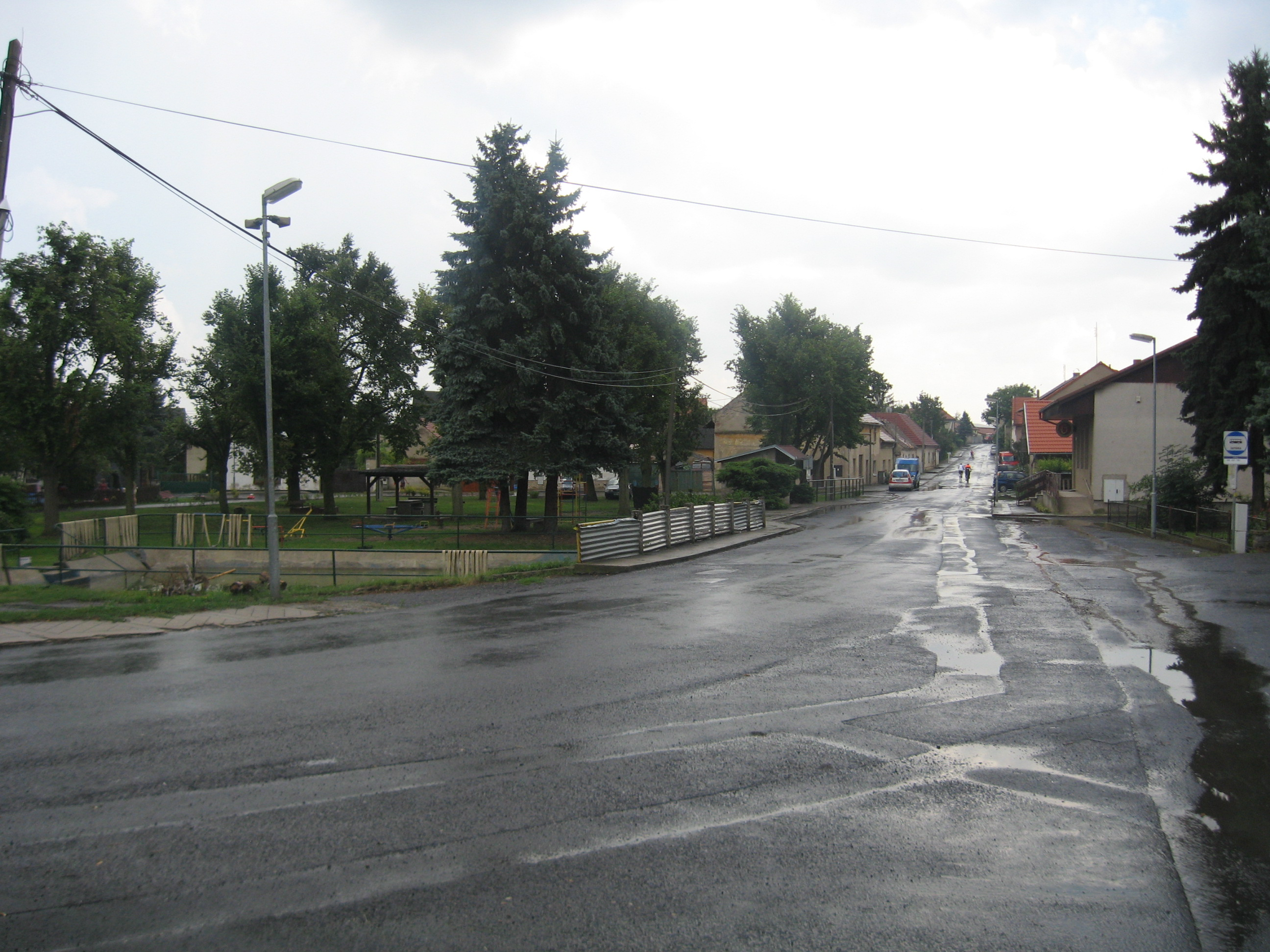
- Centre of Děčany

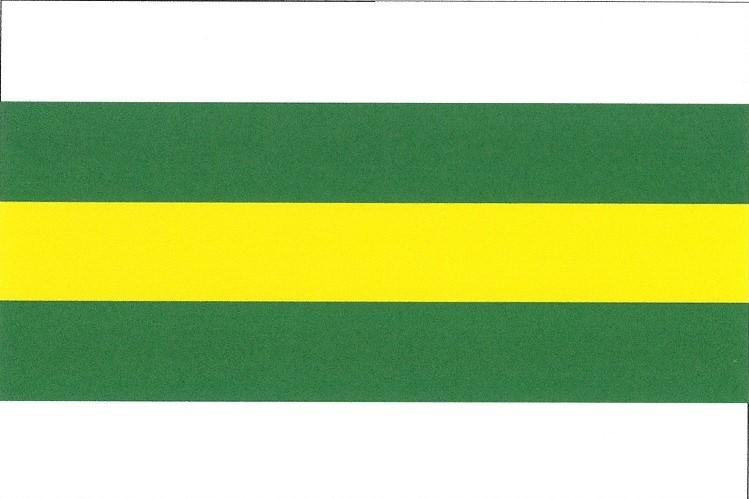
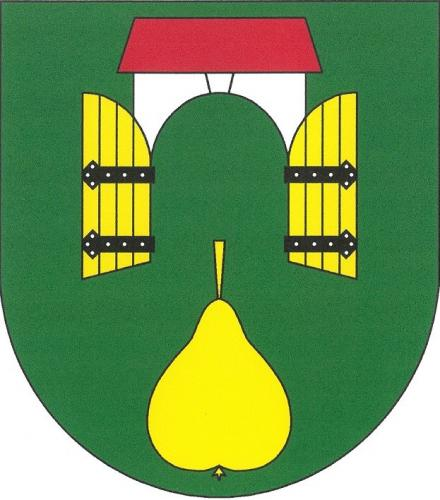
- Flag Coat of arms

- Location in the Czech Republic
- Coordinates: 50°26′19″N 13°54′31″E
- Country: Czech Republic
- Region: Ústí nad Labem
- District: Litoměřice
- First mentioned: 1226

Area
  - Total: 12.37 km^{2} (4.78 sq mi)
- Elevation: 224 m (735 ft)

Population (2026-01-01)
  - Total: 380
  - Density: 31/km^{2} (80/sq mi)
- Time zone: UTC+1 (CET)
  - Summer (DST): UTC+2 (CEST)
- Postal code: 411 15
- Website: www.decany.cz

Děčany is a municipality and village in Litoměřice District in the Ústí nad Labem Region of the Czech Republic. It has about 400 inhabitants.

Děčany lies approximately 19 kilometres (12 mi) south-west of Litoměřice, 27 km (17 mi) south of Ústí nad Labem, and 54 km (34 mi) north-west of Prague.

== Administrative division ==
Děčany consists of four municipal parts (in brackets population according to the 2021 census):

- Děčany (127)
- Lukohořany (41)
- Semeč (38)
- Solany (173)

== Demographics ==
Historical population
Year	Pop.	±%
1869	955	—
1880	1,000	+4.7%
1890	969	−3.1%
1900	969	+0.0%
1910	944	−2.6%
1921	898	−4.9%
1930	851	−5.2%
1950	626	−26.4%
1961	562	−10.2%
1970	475	−15.5%
1980	448	−5.7%
1991	429	−4.2%
2001	355	−17.2%
2011	343	−3.4%
2021	379	+10.5%
Source: Censuses
