= Maximilian Pirner =

Czech painter (1854–1924)

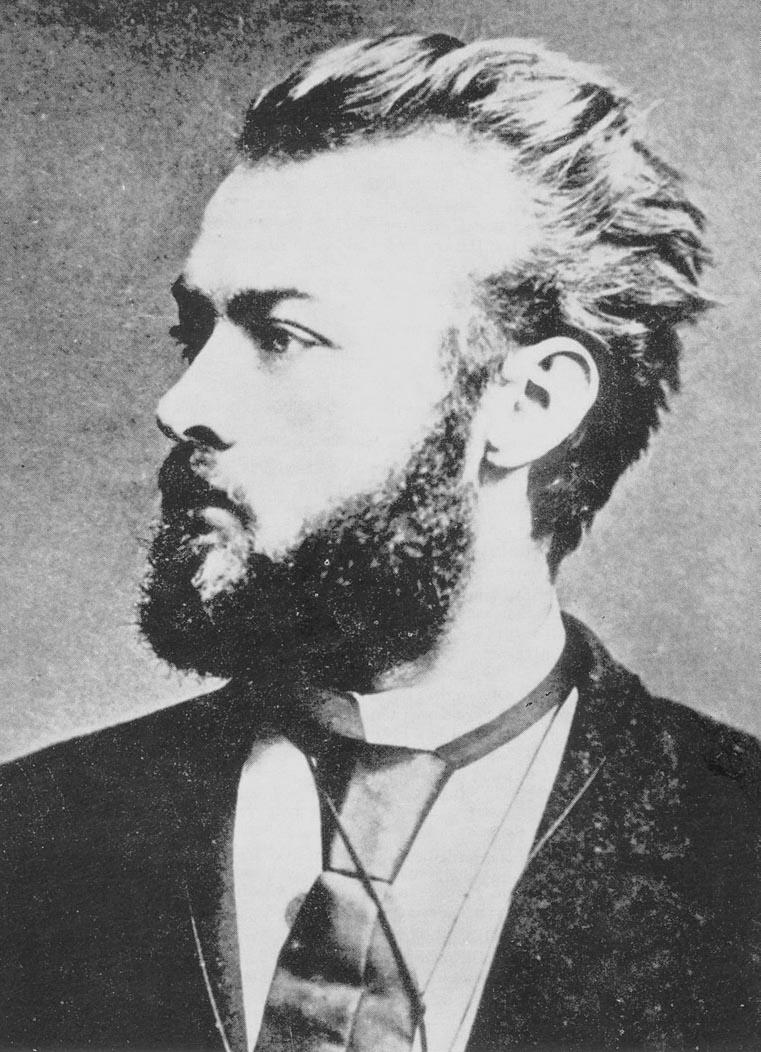
- Pirner in c. 1880
- Born: Maxmilián Pirner; 13 February 1854; Sušice, Bohemia, Austrian Empire
- Died: 2 April 1924 (aged 71); Prague, Czechoslovakia
- Education: Academy of Fine Arts, Vienna
- Notable work: Sleepwalker
- Movement: Vienna Secession

Maximilian Pirner (Czech: Maxmilián Pirner; 13 February 1854 – 2 April 1924) was a Czech painter. He was a member of the Vienna Secession, and associated with the Mánes Union of Fine Arts.

== Life and work ==
Pirner was born on 13 February 1854 in Sušice. He was enrolled from 1872 to 1874 at the Academy of Fine Arts, Prague and from 1875 to 1879 at the Academy of Fine Arts, Vienna, where he studied with his countryman, Josef Matyáš Trenkwald. He remained in Vienna until 1887, although he was not an active participant in the local artistic community. At that time, he became a teacher at the Academy in Prague and was named a Professor there in 1896.

Pirner's usual themes were classical mythology (such as his Medusa (1891) and Hecate (or Hekate; 1901)) and the macabre (such as Sleepwalker (or Girl in Her Nightie Walks on the Window-Ledge; 1878), Daemon Love (1893), and Allegory of Death (1895)). Pirner completed a number of sketches of female figures, many of them nudes. He also did stained glass windows and medals.

Described by one critic as having achieved "mastery of the sinuous line". Pirner also had his detractors. One contemporary critic, while acknowledging Pirner's talent, considered him an "over-sophisticated mystic."

He died on 2 April 1924 in Prague.

== Selected works ==
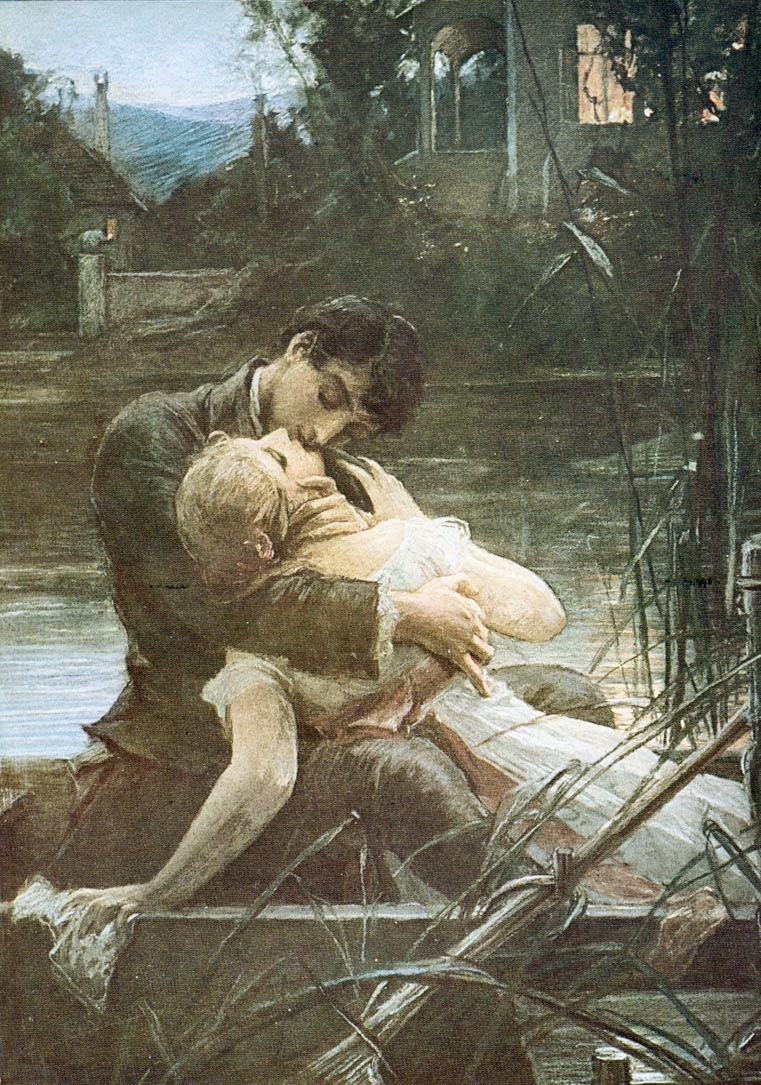
At the Heights (1883–84)

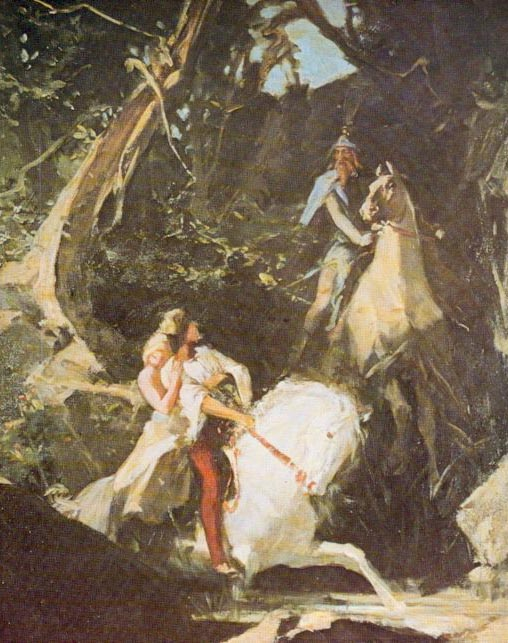
Lovers (1885)

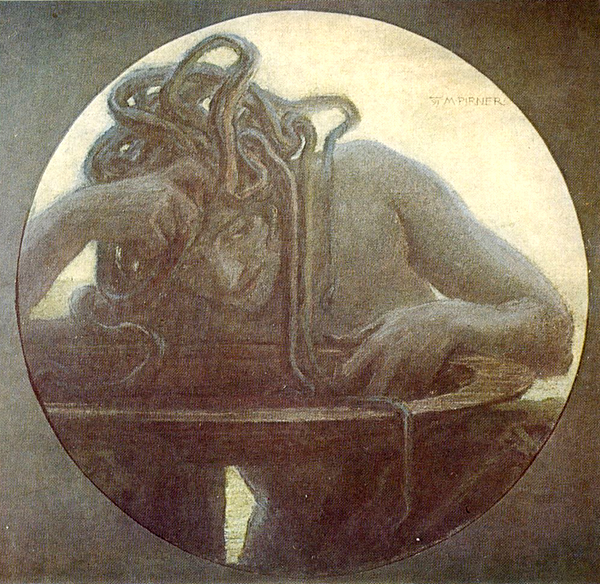
Medusa

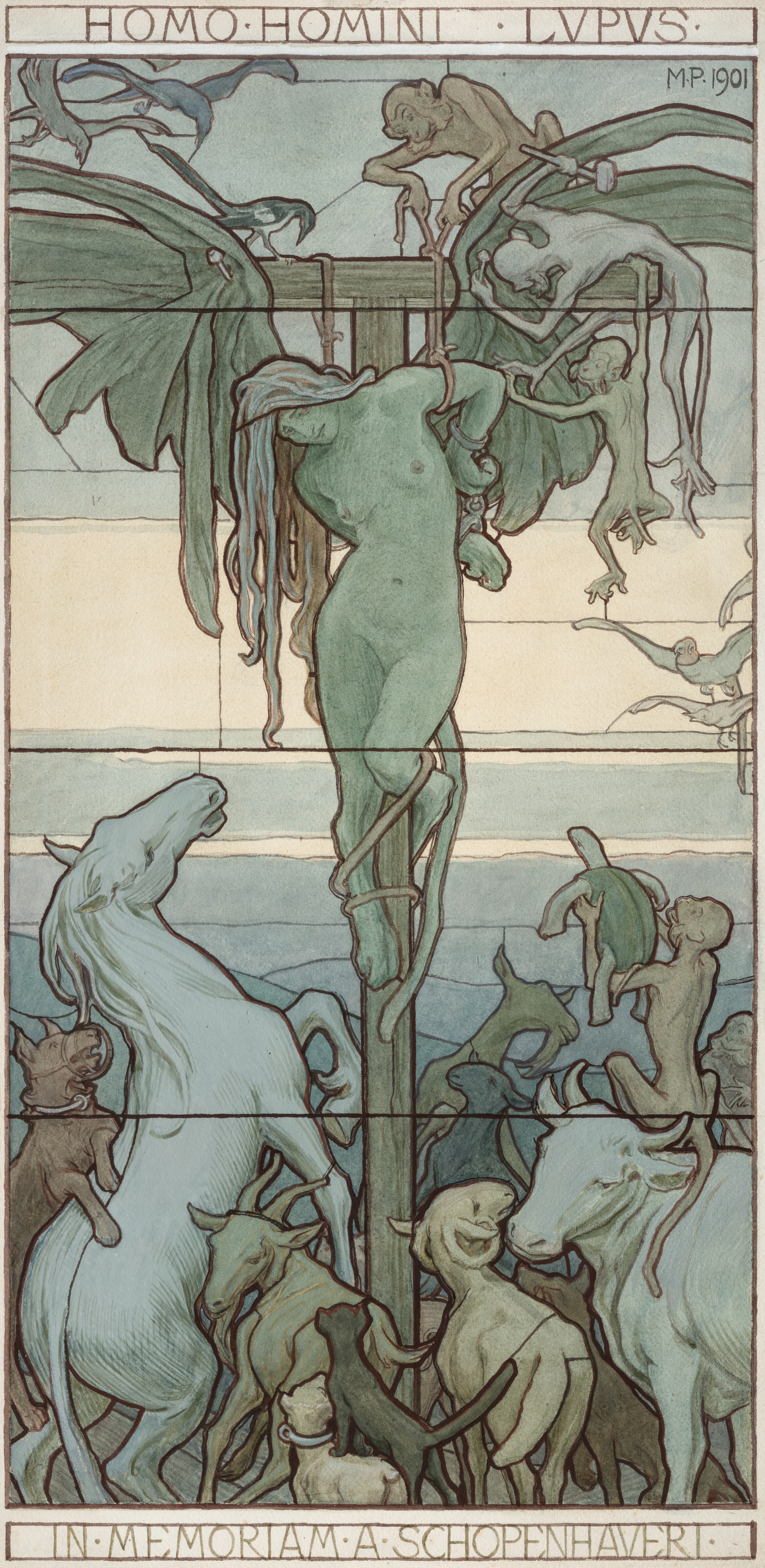
Homo homini lupus (1901)

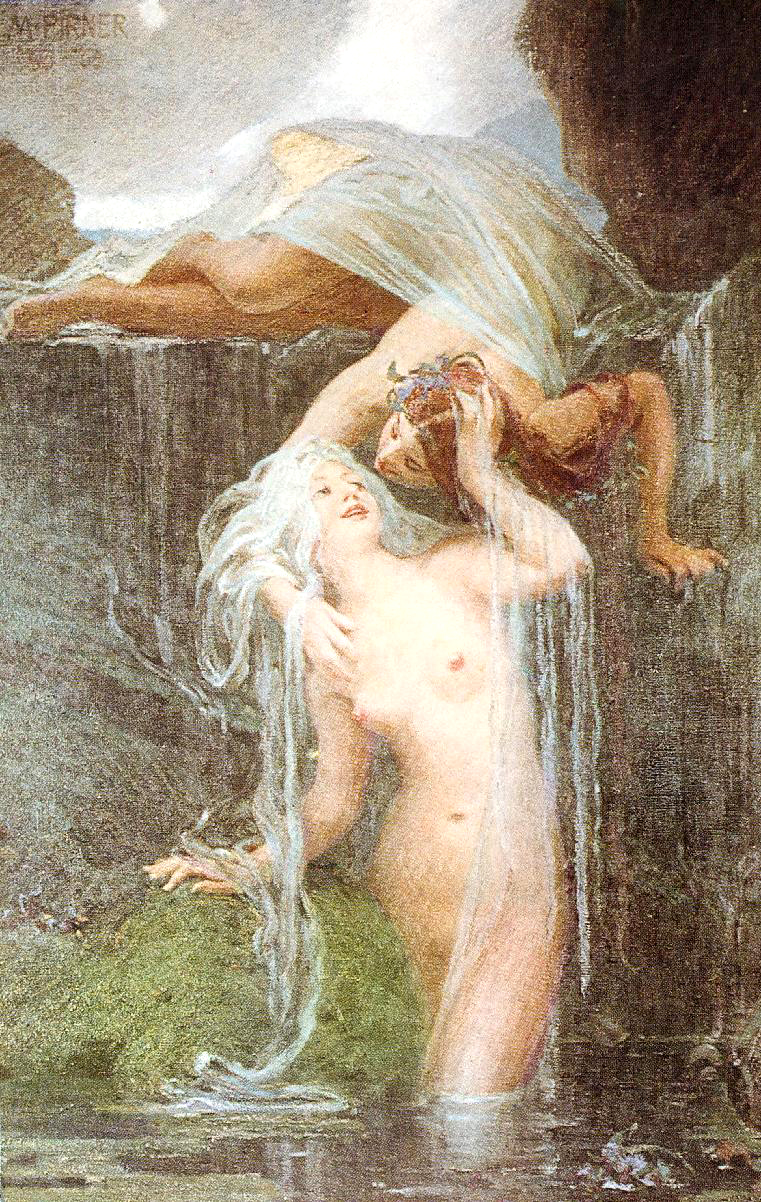
The Stream (1903)
