= Zlatá Praha =

Czech illustrated literary magazine

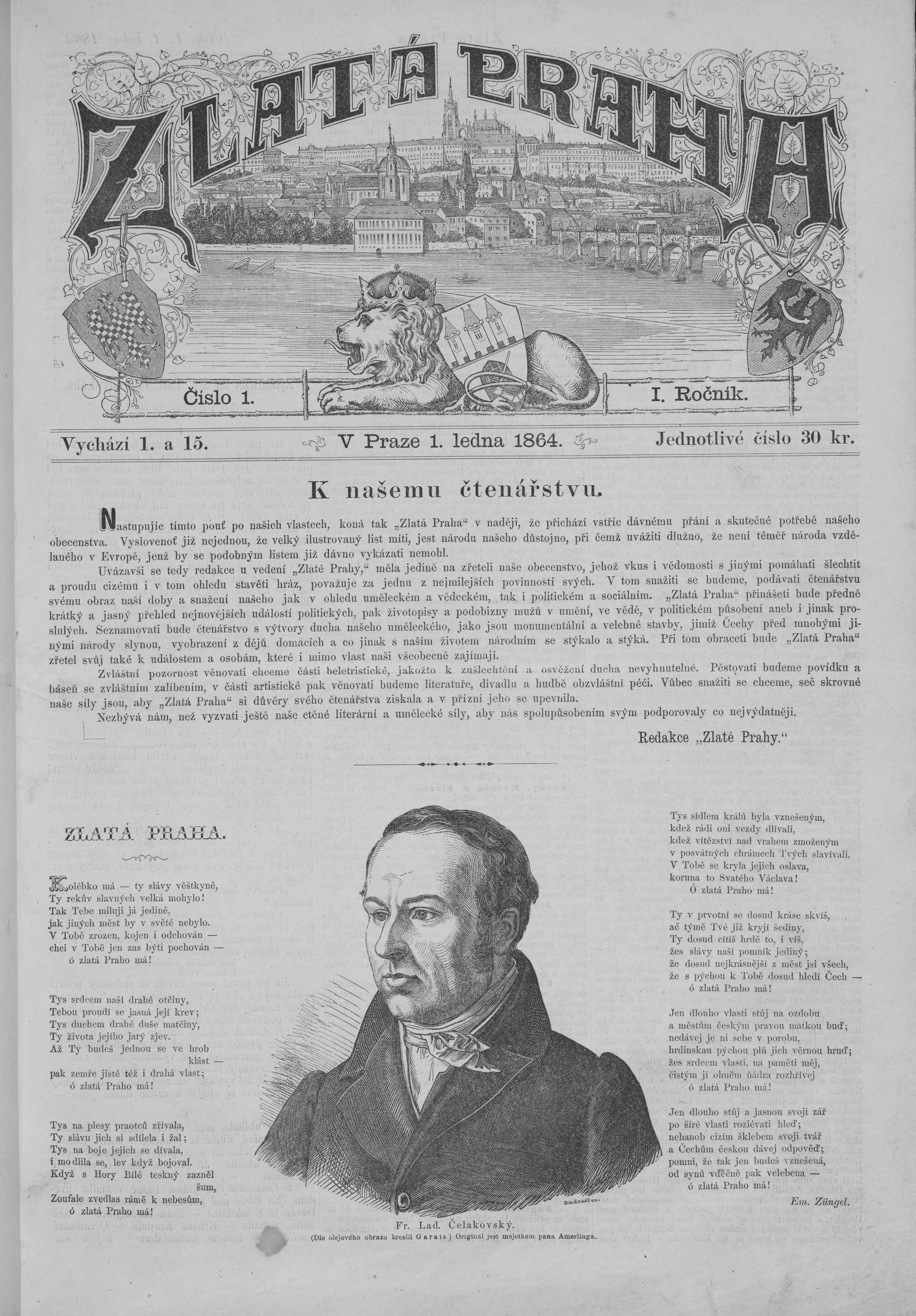
The cover of the first issue of the magazine from January, 1864

Zlatá Praha (Golden Prague) was a Czech illustrated literary magazine. Founded by poet Vítězslav Hálek, it was published separately from 1864 to 1865 before it was restarted again in 1884 by publisher Jan Otto, with Ferdinand Schulz, poet and editor-in-chief. It was then published from 1884 until 1929. The magazine published a lot of literary works (poems, short stories, novels, serialized translations etc.) and articles on culture and politics. It also featured many illustrative paintings, portraits and photographs, as well as monochrome reproductions of contemporary art. Acclaimed for its high quality content and graphics, many paintings and articles published there are now in the public domain.

== Beginnings (1864–1865) ==
The magazine Zlatá Praha was founded by Vítězslav Hálek and produced by the publishing house of Karel Seyfried from early 1864. The aim was to offer to Czech readers a format of magazine similar to that which was popular in Europe at that time. Zlatá Praha was published twice a month (on the 1st and 15th day) and included a summary of political events, biographies of important personalities, descriptions of works of art, local history articles and literary works, accompanied by high-quality illustrations.

The first issue, dated 1 January 1864, was released with a one-week delay, on 8 January 1864. It contained articles by Karel Jaromír Erben (Stará radní síň, Old Councillor Hall), Karel Vít Hof (Pouť na Velehrad, Pilgrimage to Velehrad) and Emanuel Tonner (Starý hřbitov židovský v Praze, Old Jewish Cemetery in Prague), a section focused on literature and theater, a short story by Karolína Světlá (Lamač a jeho dcera, Lamač and his Daughter), and poems by Vítězslav Hálek and Emanuel Züngel. The cover featured a portrait of František Ladislav Čelakovský. In a reaction, the magazine Národní listy appreciated the high quality of illustrations and text and supported subsequent activities of Zlatá Praha.

The promising development of the magazine ended in mid-1865, after its publisher Karel Seyfried committed suicide by shooting himself in the woods surrounding Teplice (on 22 June 1865). The last issue was published on 15 June 1865 (Volume 2, Number 12 ). In July 1865, the Národní listy reported that publishing of Zlatá Praha would apparently stop, due to the delayed settling of Seyfried's estate. Later, the administrators of the estate announced that the magazine had ceased to be published and that the subscribers would be refunded.

== In Otto's publishing house (1884–1929) ==
With the renewed publishing of the magazine from 4 January 1884, publisher Jan Otto announced his intention to make it a "sheet dedicated to the noble entertainment and spiritual life of the Czech nation." Zlatá Praha was published weekly and brought articles from the fields of science and culture, geography, philosophy and aesthetics. It also continued in the publishing of literary works and art reproductions. The first editor was Ferdinand Schulz. It was not the only illustrated weekly magazine in Bohemian lands at that time, Zlatá Praha competed with the magazine Světozor, published from 13 July 1867.

Vilém Weitenweber led the pictorial part of the magazine for more than ten years. During his tenure, the illustrations in Zlatá Praha attained a high artistic level. The magazine introduced the works of emerging and well-known Czech artists to the general public.

In 1900, Zlatá Praha and Světozor merged. Its 1000th issue was published on 16 January 1903 (Volume 20, no. 12). A series of articles described the evolution of the magazine in the previous years and presented portraits of its co-workers.

From 1923, the magazine generated a loss and ceased to be published after 26 September 1929 (Volume 46). It is considered an important archive monitoring the development of Czech art and literature in the 19th and 20th century.
