= Světozor =

Czech-language illustrated magazine

Front page of 1893 Světozor with painting by Ilya Repin

Světozor ("Seeing the World") was a Czech-language illustrated magazine published in 19th and 20th century.

== History and profile ==
Světozor was created by Pavel Josef Šafařík in 1834. Šafařík was inspired by the British penny press and the German Pfennig-Magazin. The newspaper, trying to entertain the readers with curiosities, did not incite much interest and closed down in two years.

In 1867 the magazine was reestablished by František Skrejšovský (1837–1902), an entrepreneur and politician. A substantial portion of the weekly was dedicated to the literature and the arts. Since 1899 for more than 30 years the magazine was owned by the publishing house of Jan Otto. Between 1933 and 1939 the magazine was owned by leftist journalist and photographer Pavel Altschul (1900–1944).
