= Josef Brožek =

Czech psychologist (1913–2004)

Josef Maria Brožek
- Born: August 14, 1913; Mělník, Czech Republic
- Died: January 18, 2004 (aged 90)
- Occupation: Psychologist
- Known for: Contributing to the Minnesota Starvation Experiment

Josef Maria Brožek (14 August 1913 – 18 January 2004) was a Czech psychologist who spent most of his life in the United States. He is known for contributing to the Minnesota Starvation Experiment during the end of World War II at the University of Minnesota, where he was a professor for 17 years. As the 8th president of the Society for the History of Psychology (part of the American Psychological Association), Josef M. Brožek was also active in international cooperation of psychologists.

== Background ==
Josef Maria Brožek was born on 14 August 1913, Born in Mělník in what is now the Czech Republic, he spent years in Poland and Siberia as a child. He left Czechoslovakia in 1939 and could not return to his homeland as a result of the Second World War and other cimcumstances, but he never considered himself an emigrant.

== Career ==
His PhD thesis on memory from the Charles University was awarded in 1937, shortly before the Munich Agreement. After working as an industrial psychologist in the Bata Corporation, Brožek left Czechoslovakia for the University of Pennsylvania in 1939. Later, he joined the University of Minnesota. At Lehigh University, Brožek served as departmental chair between 1959 and 1963.

In 1957, he organised a symposium in the United States named "Nutrition and Behavior". At international conferences in the 1970s, Brožek stressed the effect of malnutrition on behavior.

Along with the 7th president of the Society for the History of Psychology, Solomon Diamond, Brožek wrote the chapter "'The Roots of Objective Psychology" for the encyclopedia Die Psychologie des 20. Jahrhunderts.

After the Velvet Revolution in Prague, Brožek arranged for English literature to be distributed among Czech universities. In 1996, Charles University awarded him with a gold medal. In 1999, Masaryk University awarded him a honoris causa. Often publishing with Jiří Hoskovec, Josef M. Brožek made many research trips to Prague, with William R. Woodward as an assistant, where he studied Czech authors oriented towards psychology, such as T. G. Masaryk or J. E. Purkyně.
