= Mělník =

Town in Central Bohemian Region, Czech Republic

- Town
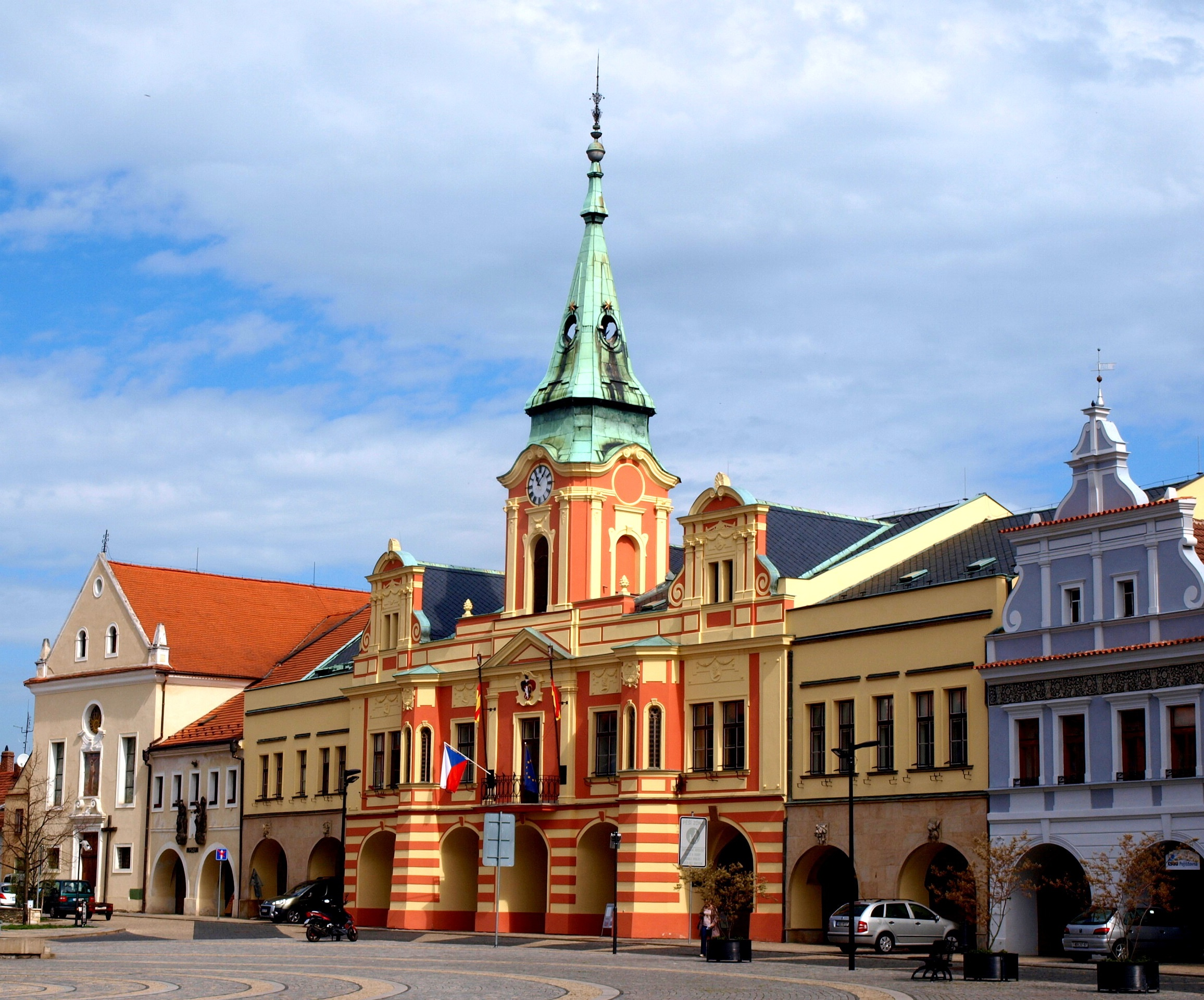
- Náměstí Míru with the town hall and former Capuchin monastery

- Flag Coat of arms

- Location in the Czech Republic
- Coordinates: 50°21′7″N 14°28′30″E
- Country: Czech Republic
- Region: Central Bohemian
- District: Mělník
- First mentioned: 1006

Government
  - Mayor: Ctirad Mikeš

Area
  - Total: 24.96 km^{2} (9.64 sq mi)
- Elevation: 215 m (705 ft)

Population (2026-01-01)
  - Total: 20,301
  - Density: 813.3/km^{2} (2,107/sq mi)
- Time zone: UTC+1 (CET)
  - Summer (DST): UTC+2 (CEST)
- Postal code: 276 01
- Website: www.melnik.cz

Mělník (Czech pronunciation: [ˈmɲɛlɲiːk]; German: Melnik) is a town in the Central Bohemian Region of the Czech Republic. It has about 20,000 inhabitants. The town is located at the confluence of the two longest Czech rivers, Elbe and Vltava, and is one of the largest river ports of the Czech Republic. Mělník lies in one of the most important agricultural areas of the country and is known for its production of wine.

Mělník is among the longest continuously inhabited locations in the country. It was promoted to a town in 1274 and then it became a dowry town ruled by the queens of Bohemia. The historic town centre is well preserved and is protected as an urban monument zone. The main landmark of Mělník is the Mělník Castle.

== Etymology ==
The name is derived from the Slavic word mělnit, here meaning 'to crumble'. Originally, Mělník was the name of a hill formed by crumbling Cretaceous rocks.

== Geography ==
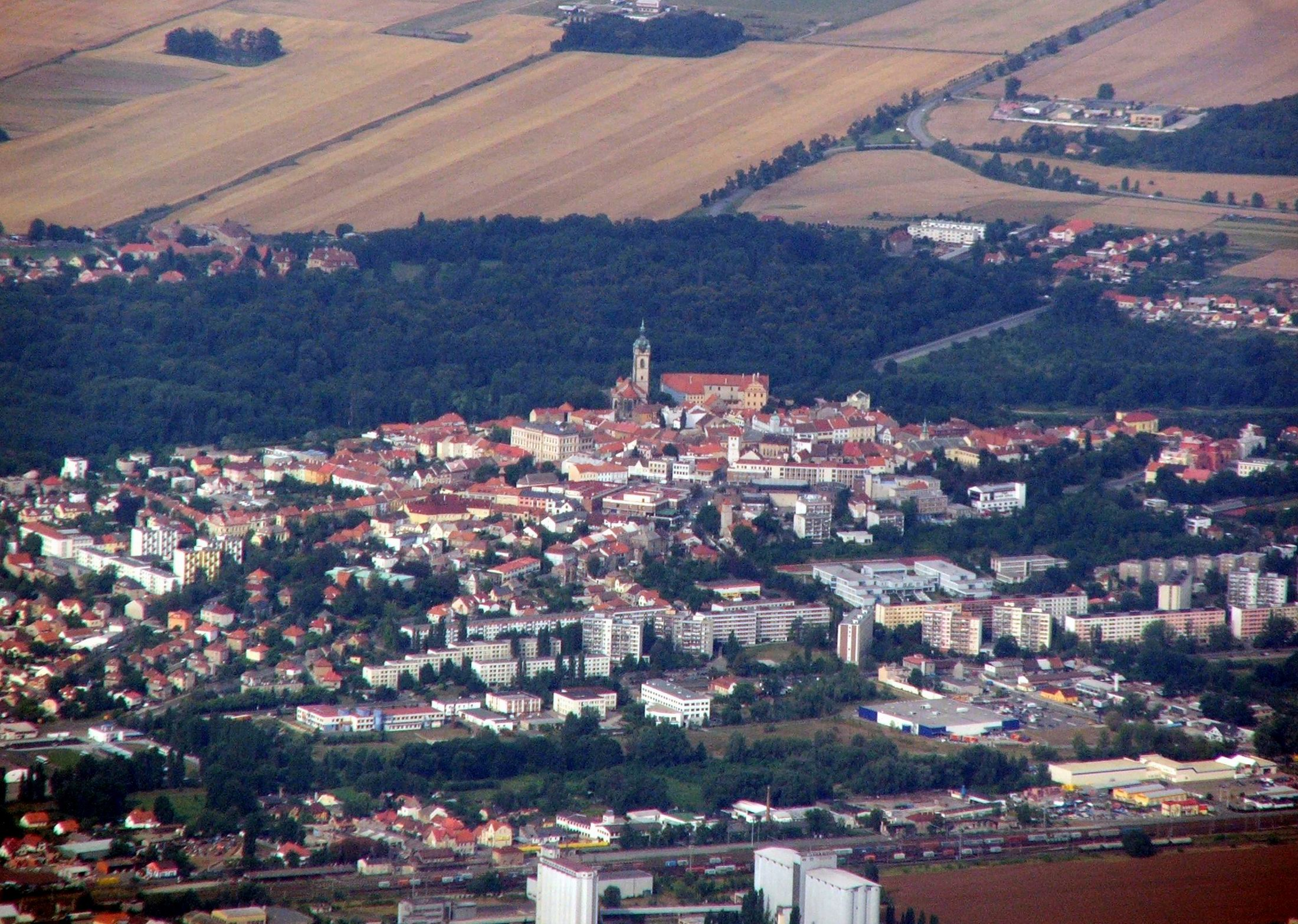
Aerial view of Mělník

Mělník is located about 27 kilometres (17 mi) north of Prague. It is situated on the right bank of the Elbe, at the confluence of the Elbe and Vltava rivers.

The town lies in the Polabí lowlands. The southwestern part of the municipal territory lies in the Central Elbe Table, the northeastern part lies in the Jizera Table. The highest point is the hill Chloumeček at 282 m (925 ft) above sea level.

== History ==
In the 5th and 6th century, many Slavic tribes lived here and the tribe of Pšovans created its main settlement in Mělník. Saint Ludmila (the grandmother of Saint Wenceslaus), who married the Bohemian prince Bořivoj I, belonged to this tribe. Coins of the princess Emma, who died in 1005 or 1006, are the first demonstration of the existence of Mělník. In November 1274, Mělník gained the status of town from King Ottokar II and later became a dowry town belonging to queens of Bohemia.

In 1449, the town gained the right to decide on its own affairs, through councilors headed by the mayor. The town gained fame in the first half of the 16th century thanks to viticulture, the origins of which date back to the end of the 9th century, but the preconditions for its real development were created only by Charles IV, who brought vines from Burgundy to Mělník.

The town suffered from the events of the Thirty Years' War. Mělník became moderately involved in the Bohemian Revolt (1618–1620), and was punished by confiscation of property and gradual re-Catholicisation. In 1628, its population was predominantly Catholic. Mělník had to deal with enemy military incursions, especially the Saxons and the Swedes; it was also affected by devastating fires (1646, 1652, 1681) and by plague. The church, castle and town hall were damaged.

The wars in the 18th century brought considerable damage to the town, but it was most affected by the fire in 1765, which destroyed 42 houses including the town hall and Capuchin monastery. It was followed by another stage of the Baroque transformation of the town.

In 1850, Mělník became a district town. In 1869, a sugar factory was established, for a long time the only industrial company in the town. In 1874 a railway line was brought to Mělník, which helped its economic development. In 1888 a bridge over the Elbe was built, and at the end of the 19th century a transhipment depot was built, the basis of the later port.

== Demographics ==
Historical population

| Year | Pop. | ±% |
|---|---|---|
| 1869 | 7,112 | — |
| 1880 | 7,656 | +7.6% |
| 1890 | 8,247 | +7.7% |
| 1900 | 8,976 | +8.8% |
| 1910 | 9,806 | +9.2% |

| Year | Pop. | ±% |
|---|---|---|
| 1921 | 10,502 | +7.1% |
| 1930 | 12,089 | +15.1% |
| 1950 | 11,914 | −1.4% |
| 1961 | 13,076 | +9.8% |
| 1970 | 15,487 | +18.4% |

| Year | Pop. | ±% |
|---|---|---|
| 1980 | 18,941 | +22.3% |
| 1991 | 19,625 | +3.6% |
| 2001 | 19,271 | −1.8% |
| 2011 | 19,599 | +1.7% |
| 2021 | 19,588 | −0.1% |

Source: Censuses

== Economy ==
The largest industrial employers based in the town are Erwin Junker Grinding Technology (manufacturer of grinding tools) and Vibracoustic CZ (manufacturer of rubber products), both employing more than 500 people. The largest non-industrial employer is the Mělník Hospital.

=== Viticulture ===
Mělník gives its name to the Mělnická wine region, one of the most northerly in Europe. Every year, at the end of September, a wine festival is held in Mělník on the Feast of St. Wenceslaus.

According to legend, the Great Moravian Prince Svatopluk I sent the Bohemian Prince Bořivoj I a barrel of wine to celebrate the birth of his son Spytihněv I. It is said that Ludmila subsequently had vines brought from Moravia and planted not far from her birthplace, the fortified settlement of Pšov, today's Mělník. Ludmila's grandson St. Wenceslaus personally took care of the vineyards, and became the patron saint of winemakers.

== Transport ==
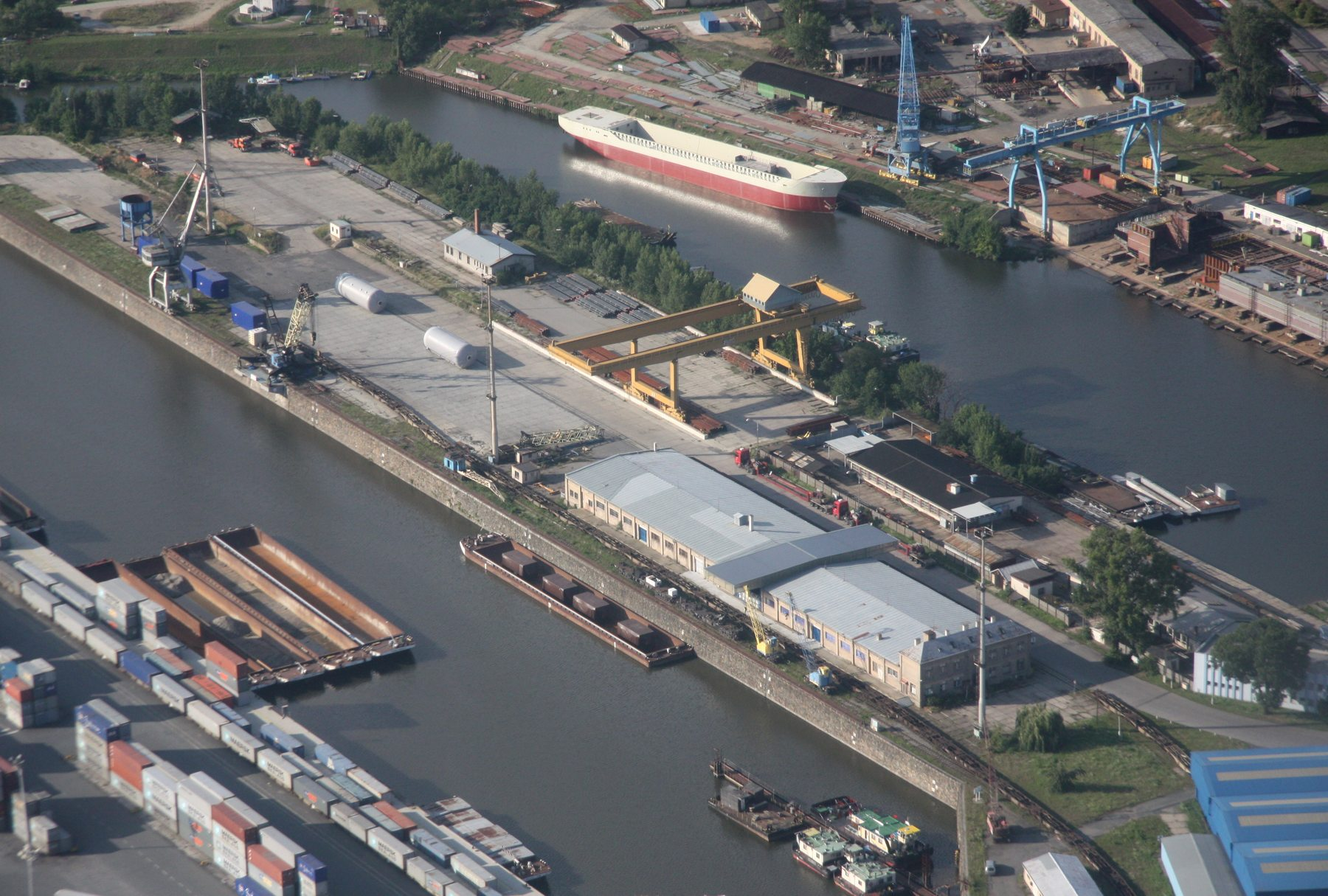
River port in Mělník

Mělník is situated on the crossroads of two first-class roads: the I/9 (which connects the D8 motorway with Česká Lípa and the Czech–German border) and the I/16 (the section from the D8 motorway to Mladá Boleslav).

Mělník is located on the railway lines Ústí nad Labem–Kolín and Prague–Mělník.

Mělník is one of the largest river ports in the Czech Republic and a place of container transshipment. The land part of the port has an area of 42 hectares (100 acres).

== Sights ==
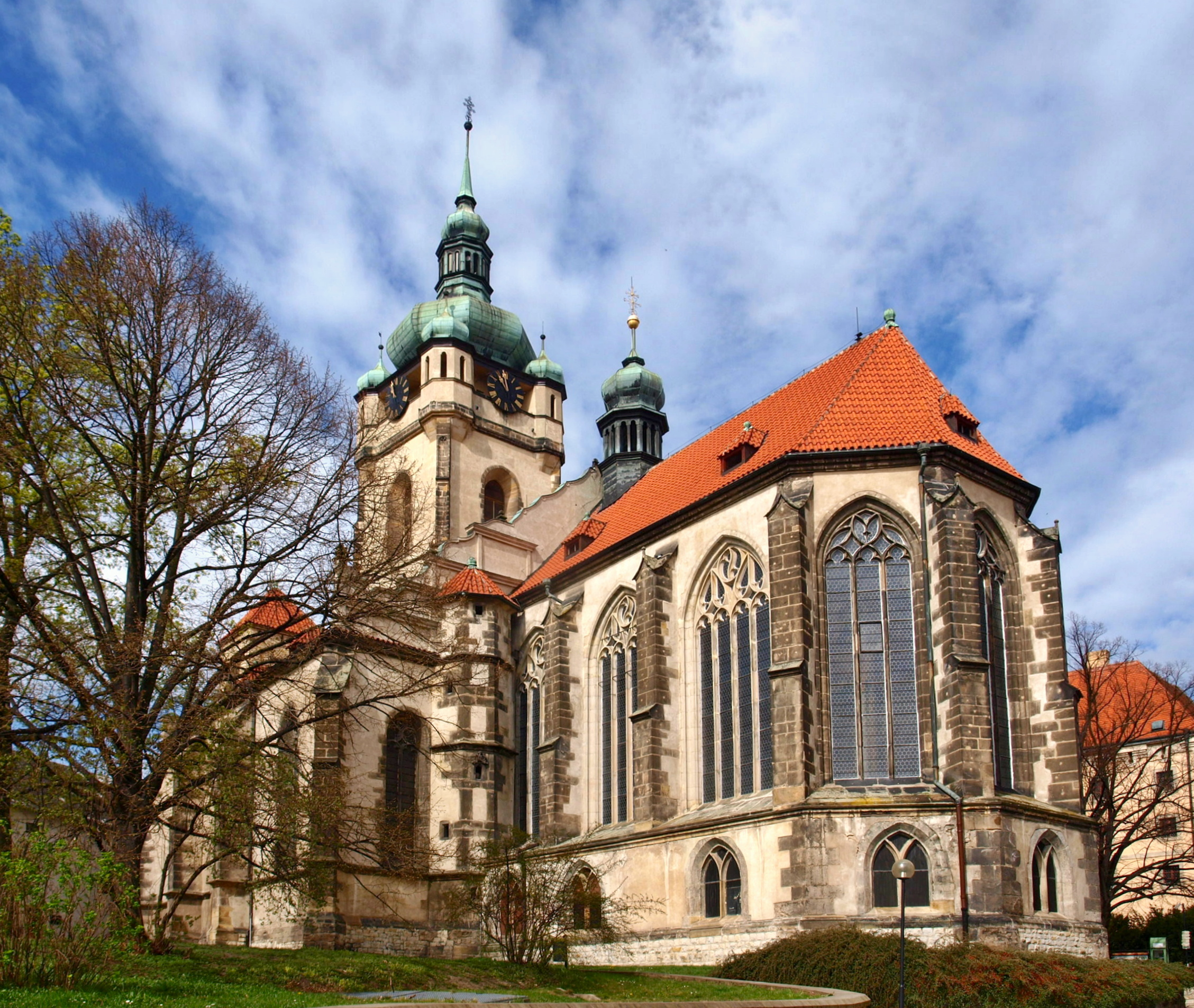
Church of Saints Peter and Paul

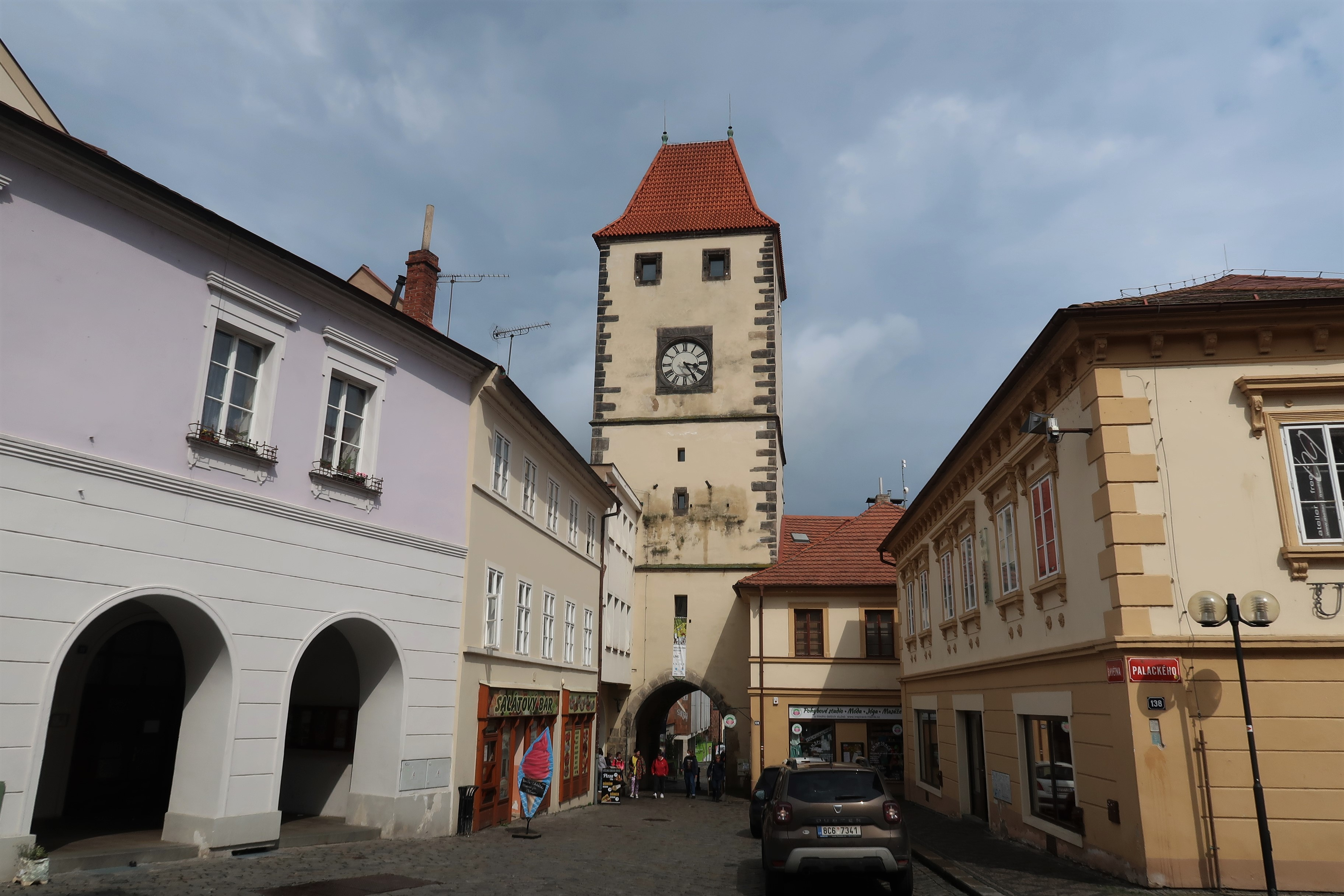
Prague Gate

The square Náměstí Míru is the historic centre of Mělník. It is lined with valuable Renaissance and Neo-Renaissance houses. The main landmark of the square is the town hall with Renaissance archways, Gothic bay window of the Chapel of St. Barbara, and a Baroque tower. The Church of the Fourteen Holy Helpers with the building of former Capuchin monastery are also located on the square.

The Mělník Castle is one of the most important sights of the town. The castle is built in the Renaissance style. Below the castle there are large wine cellars. Confiscated by the communists, it has been restored to its traditional owners, the Lobkowicz family.

Church of Saints Peter and Paul was rebuilt three times. Construction began at the turn of the 10th and 11th centuries, but the oldest preserved part is from the 1480s. The opulent presbytary is from around 1520. Other major reconstructions were made and the fires in 1555 and 1681, when renaissance gables and the baroque dome of a gothic tower were damaged. The current appearance of the church is the result of extensive repairs in 1910 and 1913–1915. The church is still used primarily for religious functions, but it is open for the public. Starting in 2007, the public will be allowed access to the reconstructed church tower. There is a large and elaborate ossuary inside the church. Anthropologist Jindřich Matiegka conducted research here between 1915 and 1919, during which he arranged the remains of 10–15 thousand people.

Behind the church there is a building of the old school, formerly the seat of the Mělník's chapter. It used to be a part of the town's fortifications. Remains of the fortifications are still preserved, including a 20m high water tower from the 16th century. The most preserved part is the Prague Gate from the 1530s. Near the castle there is Villa Carola, where the town library is located, which is a part of the Culture Centre of Mělník.

== Notable people ==
- Ludmila of Bohemia (c. 860 – 921), martyr and saint
- Emma of Mělník (before 950 – 1005/06), wife of Boleslaus II; died here
- John Henry (1322–1375), Count of Tyrol and Margrave of Moravia
- Barbara of Cilli (1392–1451), queen; lived and died here
- Jan Nepomuk Maýr (1818–1888), opera singer, opera director, conductor and composer
- Viktor Dyk (1877–1931), poet and writer
- Bohumil Rameš (1895–1974), cyclist
- Josef Brožek (1913–2004), psychologist
- Pavel Zářecký (born 1940), politician and lawyer
- Kateřina Jacques (born 1971), politician
- Pavel Verbíř (born 1972), footballer
- Rudolf Kraj (born 1977), boxer
- Jitka Čvančarová (born 1978), actress
- Václav Drobný (1980–2012), footballer
- Jiří Prskavec (born 1993), canoeist, Olympic winner

== Twin towns – sister cities ==
Mělník is twinned with:

- Lučenec, Slovakia
- Oranienburg, Germany
- Przeworsk, Poland
- Sandanski, Bulgaria (the municipality also includes Melnik)
- Wetzikon, Switzerland
