= ANO pro Evropu =

NGO based in Prague, Czech Republic

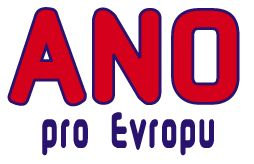
- Official Logo
- Formation: 2002
- Dissolved: N/A
- Type: NGO
- Purpose: To fully integrate the Czech Republic into the EU
- Headquarters: Prague, Czech Rep.
- Chairperson: Monika MacDonagh-Pajerová
- Affiliations: EU

ANO pro Evropu (Czech for 'YES for Europe') was an NGO based in Prague, Czech Republic. ANO pro Evropu seeks to be broadly-based, and is nonpartisan and nonparticipatory in elections.

== Goals and Initiatives ==
ANO pro Evropu was a civic association which intended to achieve the following objectives within the Czech Republic:
1) To work to try to make Europe as much of a 'shared space' as possible in national debate, rather than another area left to partisan fighting.
2) To build awareness of the benefits of taking a positive approach to full engagement in the Union, including the necessity to avoid an elite-focus.
3) To promote the idea that membership is relevant to all groups and communities- that Europe is 'us,' not 'them.'

ANO organized events in cooperation with other groups in accordance with the following principles:

- To provide non-partisan forums which take a practical and accessible approach to issues.
- To create relevant publications with which to inform the public and stimulate a more constructive debate on integration into the EU.
- To create occasions for the general Czech public to receive information and to be able to participate in this debate.
- To involve local government, other NGOs, and businesses throughout the Czech Republic in discussion of major EU membership-related issues.
- To help develop a network of individuals and organizations willing to work together on promoting a positive engagement with EU membership.

== Role in the Czech European Union Referendum ==
Their initial objective as an organization was to design and implement a project to promote a high voter turnout and high affirmative vote in the Czech referendum addressing the proposed accession into the EU by campaigning throughout the Czech Republic beginning in 2002. The organization assembled over 118 prominent campaigners, with former President Václav Havel as the principal supporter. Operationally, the campaign involved:

- 85,000 posters put up throughout the country.
- A series of national press conferences dealing with the main issues which were projected to be effected positively by accession of the Czech Rep. into the EU; including health, education, the environment, democracy, culture, and the economy.
- Over 40 local events with a mixture of prominent speakers and subject experts.
- A major public concert in Prague a few days before polling.
- Publication and circulation of a wide range of "Yes Camp" propaganda.
- Assembling of pro-Europe groups to coordinate their respective activities.

This was the first free referendum in Czech history, and the people voted in favor of membership of the European Union by 77%. ANO's campaign was by far the most prominent non-party effort in the referendum.

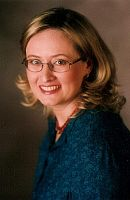
Monika MacDonagh Pajerová

== Leadership ==
- Monika MacDonagh Pajerová, the organization's chairperson, was the official spokesperson for the student revolutionary movement in Prague's Velvet Revolution in 1989.
- Václav Havel, under the auspices of which the organization was founded, is the former president of Czechoslovakia (1989–1992) and of the Czech Republic (1993–2003).

=== Other Supporters ===
- Petr Pithart, Czech senator, and former Prime Minister of the Czech Republic
- Jiří Dienstbier, diplomat and former Minister of Foreign Affairs
- Josef Zieleniec, former Minister of Foreign Affairs
- Jaroslav Šedivý, diplomat and former Minister of Foreign Affairs
- Tomáš Halík, president of Czech Christian Academy
- Jiřina Šiklová, founder of the Center for Gender Studies in Prague
- Jarmila Poláková, managing director of the Film and Sociology Comp.
- Olga Sozanská, managing director of the National Volunteer Center
- Jiří Pehe, director of New York University in Prague

=== Founding Members ===
- Vladimír Špidla, Commissioner of the European Commission, and former Prime Minister of the Czech Republic
- Petr Pithart
- Karel Schwarzenberg
- Jiří Pehe
- Jiřina Šiklová
- Marta Kubišová, Czech singer
- Svatopluk Karásek, Czech singer
- Monika MacDonagh Pajerová
