= Erwin Junker =

German manufacturer (1930–2024)

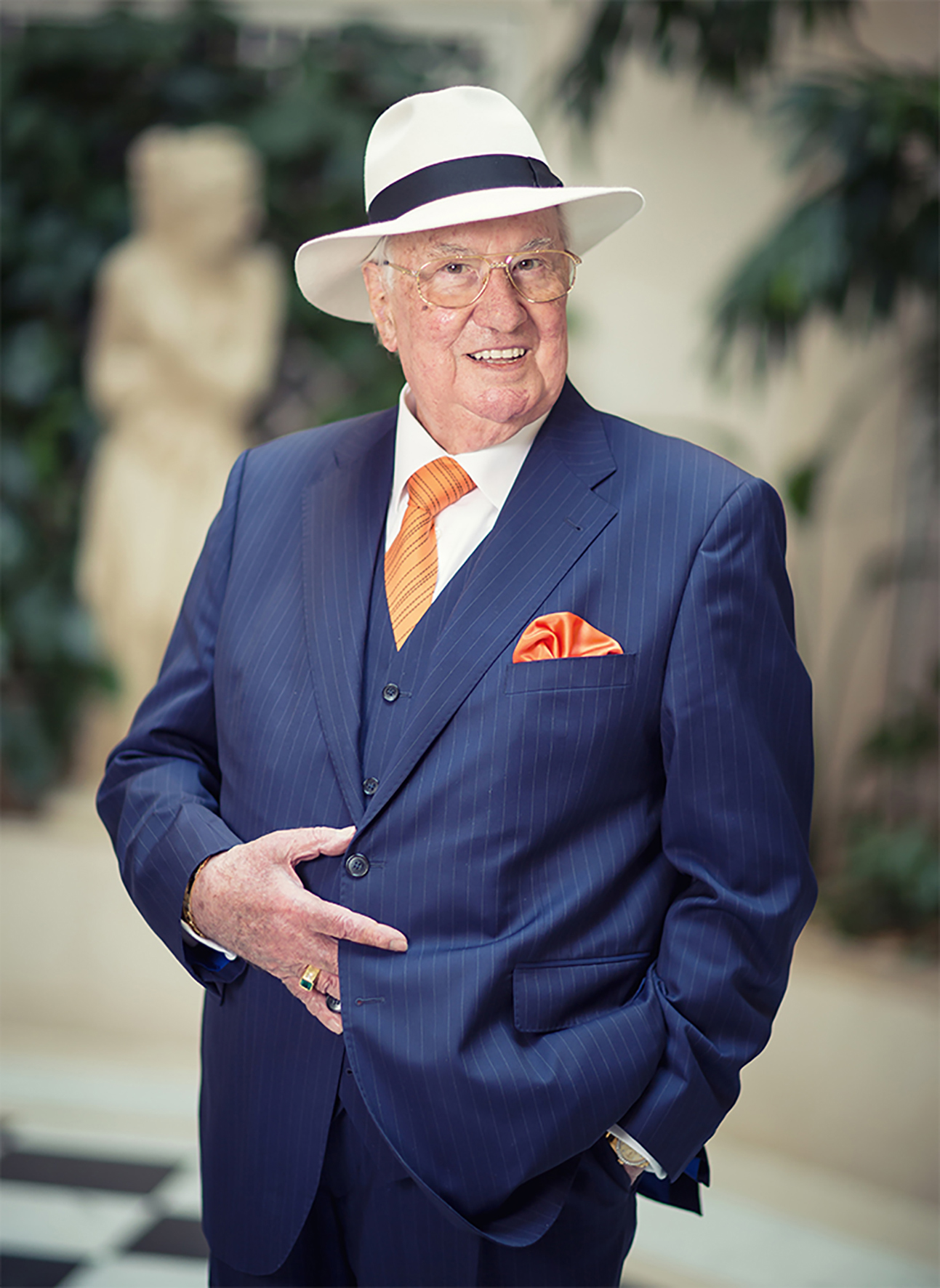
Portrait of Erwin Junker

Erwin Junker (15 April 1930 – 13 July 2024) was a German manufacturer who was the owner and founder of the Junker Group.

== Early life and education ==
Erwin Junker was born on 15 April 1930, in the Black Forest town of Nordrach, near Offenburg, Germany, to saw mill owners Zäzilia and Ludwig Junker as the oldest of five children. After attending the elementary school in the Kolonie district, he worked for his parents’ company for three years. However, instead of taking over his parents’ business, as was the tradition, Erwin Junker opted for a career in mechanical engineering. In 1947, he started an apprenticeship with the Haas Company. After a year he switched to the Company Prototyp in Zell am Harmersbach, where he was working from 1948 to 1962. Starting out as an apprentice, he worked his way up to becoming an assistant mechanical engineer before continuing his education to receive his master craftsman degree. Subsequently, he moved to the mechanical engineering department, where he was in charge or training apprentices for 10 years. It was here, where he also invented a fully automated machine for grinding the tips of machine screw taps. He was promoted to the department head and soon also put in charge of a newly created grinding machine department. Following some disagreements with management, he resigned and founded his own company.

== Manufacturer ==
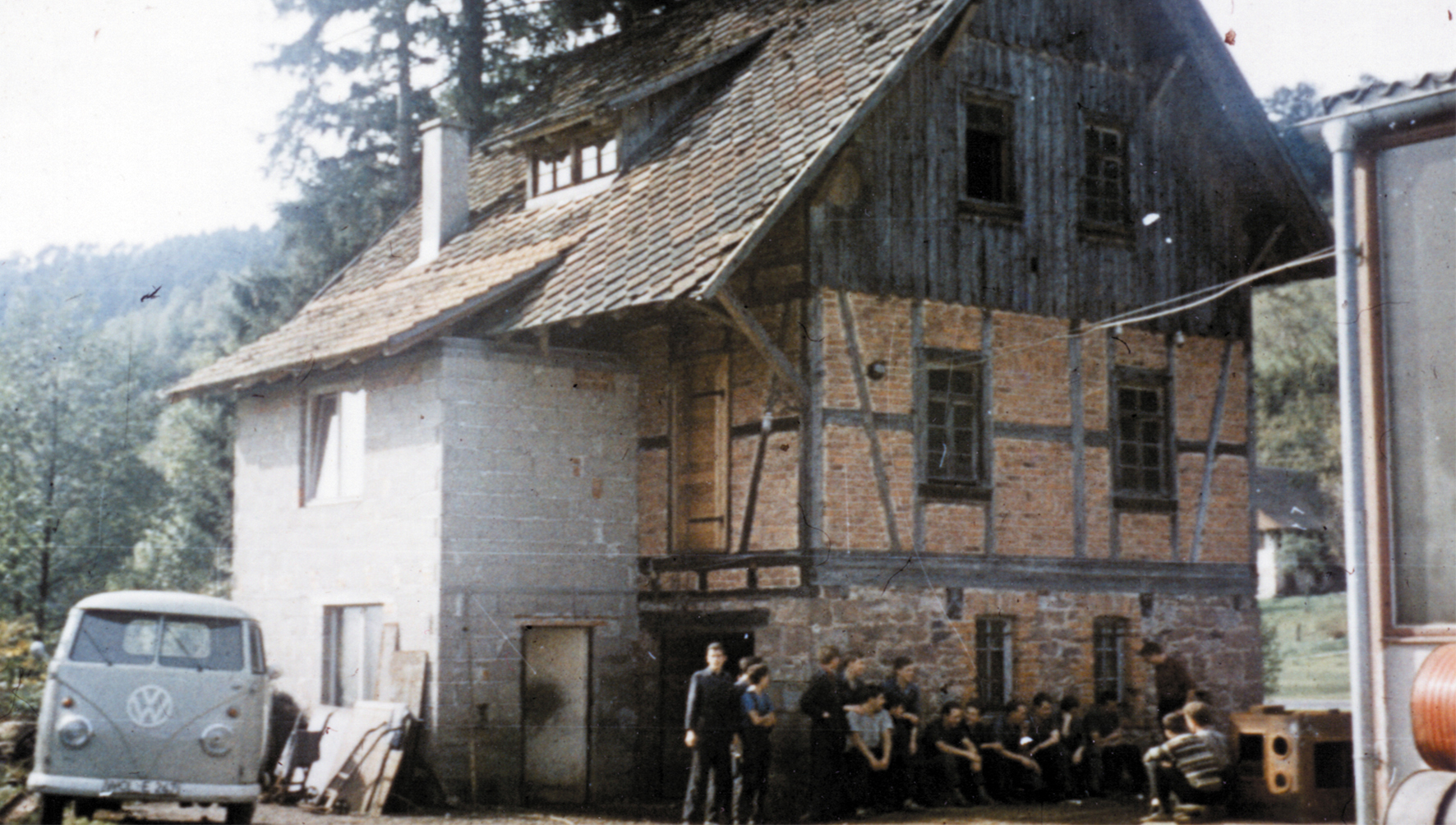
Grain mill in Nordrach, Germany

In 1962, after receiving his master craftsman’s diploma at the age of 28, and backed by a 15,000 DM guarantee from his father and 8,000 DM of his own savings, Erwin Junker founded the company “Erwin Junker Maschinen- und Apparatebau” in Nordrach. He threw all his energy into his business, which was based in a former grain mill, sometimes working up to twenty hours a day and spending up to 250 days a year on business trips. On these trips, Erwin Junker formed many connections which helped him to expand his business abroad. He also maintained trade relations with China and the Soviet Union as one of the first businesses to do so. In the following years, the company premises around the mill continued to grow and the business expanded internationally. In 1992, Erwin Junker decided to take over three Czech grinding machine manufacturers. In 1995, LTA Lufttechnik GmbH, a manufacturer of filtration systems, became part of the Junker Group. And finally, Brazilian grinding machine manufacturer ZEMA Zselics Ltda. also joined the company group in 2015. In August 2016, the entrepreneur founded the Erwin Junker Manufacturer Foundation. In doing so, Erwin Junker paved the way for maintaining the current structure of the JUNKER Group, ensuring that it does not end up fragmented and in third-party hands and will instead be able to continue to operate successfully on the global market. As of 2018, the JUNKER Group has over 1500 employees at 14 sites.

== Innovations ==
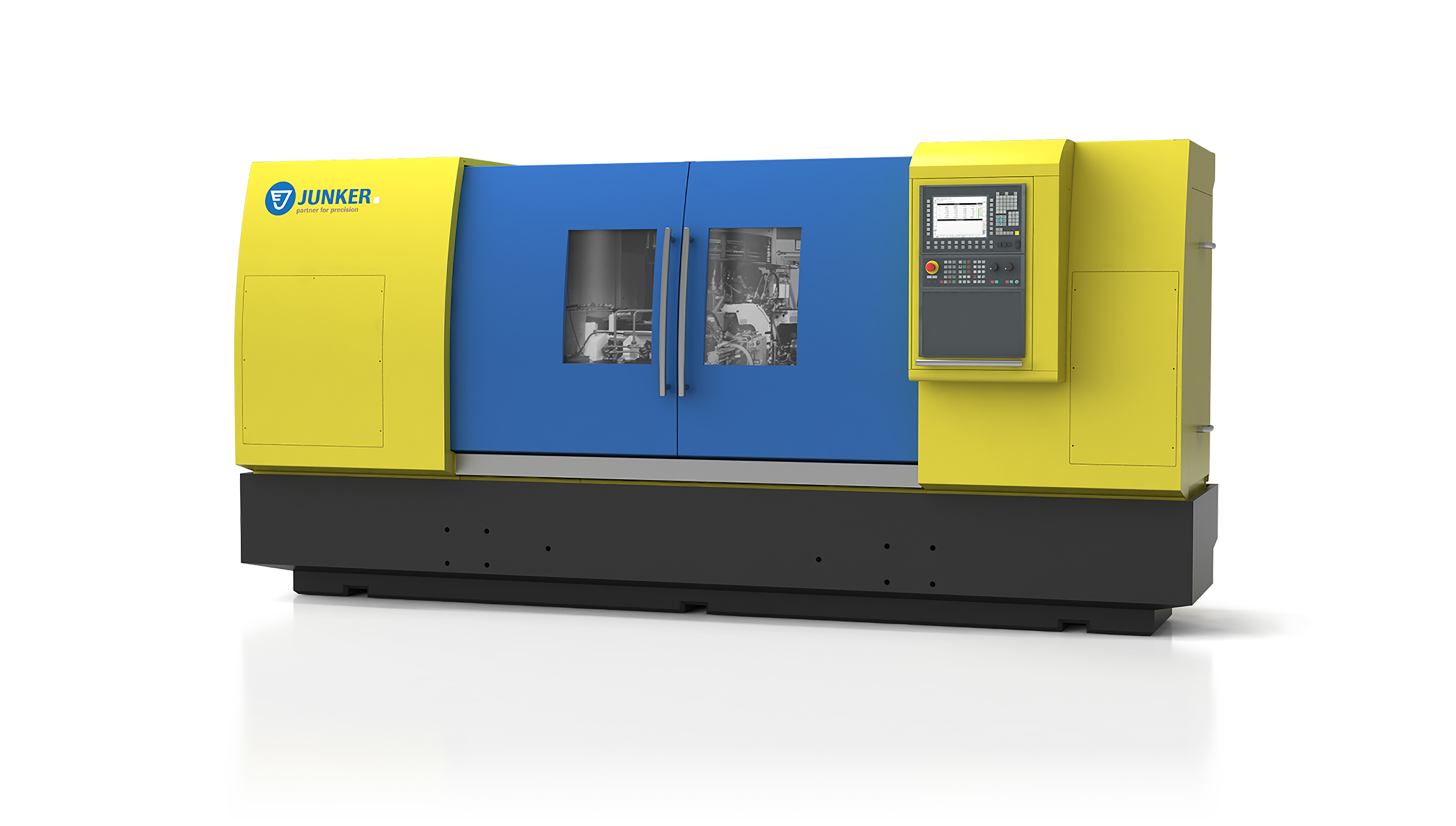
Machine with Quickpoint

Even as a child, Erwin Junker had an exceptional talent for invention. Growing up in Nordrach, where, for example, replacement parts for his gramophone were not readily available, he simply built the parts himself. As of 2018, the Junker Group has filed over 80 patents, including groundbreaking technology for the grinding industry. Erwin Junker also holds the rights to his Quickpoint technology, invented in 1984, which aligns the abrasive wheel to the tool axis. With this new point grinding, it was possible to handle all possible contours in one setup in just a single clamping operation. The computer-controlled grinding wheel moves along the programmed contour with pinpoint accuracy and machines almost any material from plastic to carbide.

== Political, social and cultural activities ==
Erwin Junker had a strong connection to his home community. At the age of 24, he started running the local Horex motorcycle club, and at 29, became the head of the volunteer fire brigade. He also was involved in organizing the preservation and renovation of the local church. In 1962, Erwin Junker was elected into the town council and received more votes than any other candidate in Nordrach before him. For the following decade, he was the acting mayor. He was also elected to the supervisory board for the Volksbank in Zell and was a member of the advisory board for a trade association. Furthermore, in 1968, Erwin Junker was named an honorary commander of the voluntary fire brigade in Nordrach, in recognition of his exceptional contributions. In 1987, he was awarded the Federal Cross of Merit. Ultimately, he sent this back, as a response to his disappointment in the German state. In 1990, he was named an honorary citizen of Nordrach in recognition of his efforts.

== Social involvement ==
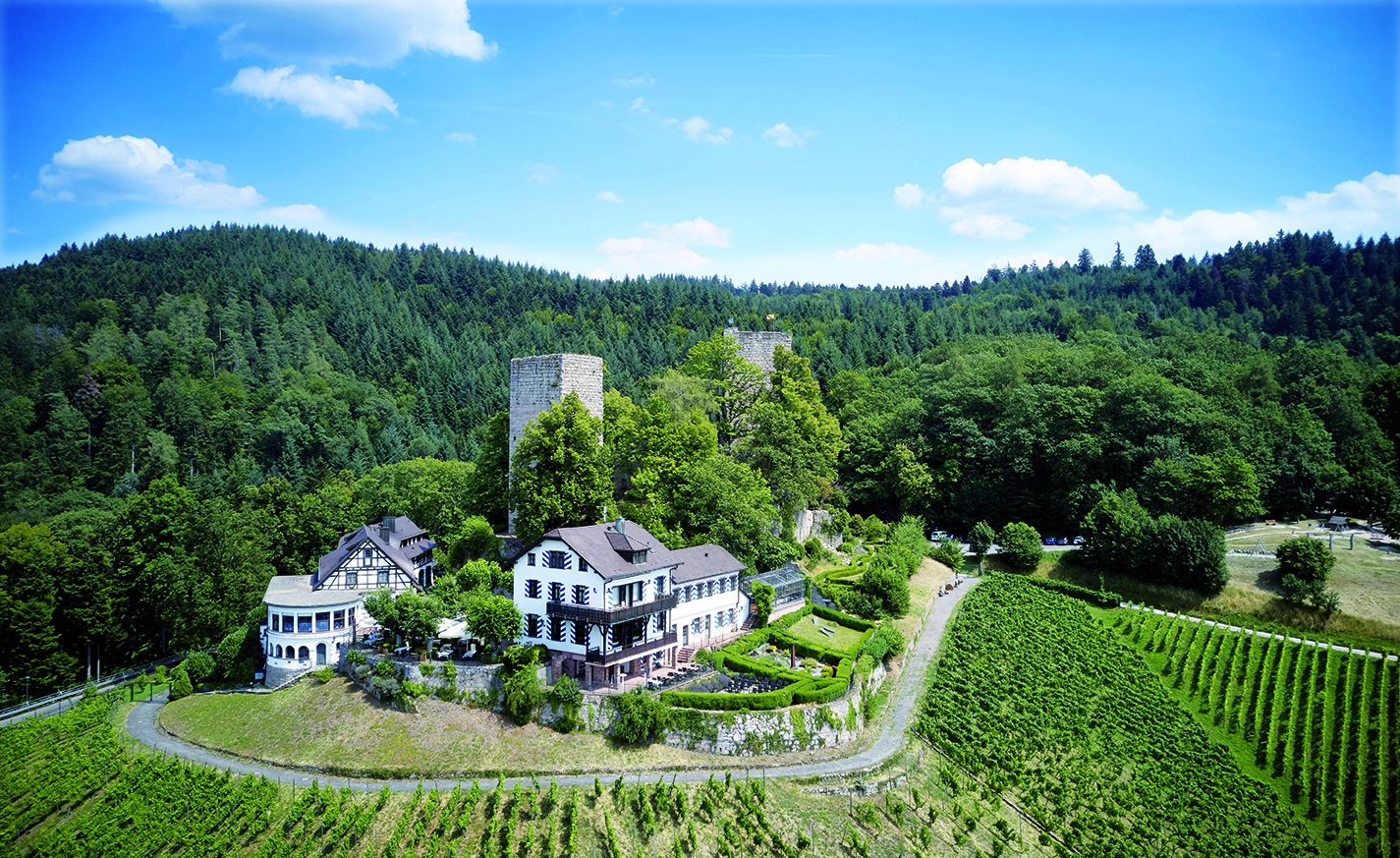
Windeck castle

In 2018, Erwin Junker purchased the late-romantic Windeck castle in Bühl, Baden, thereby preserving this historic monument. He also owned the Finkenzeller Hof in Nordrach.

== Miscellaneous ==
The Junker Group own several company helicopters and aircraft so that they can, for example, quickly take customers and spare parts from A to B and be rapidly available at the Czech and German sites.

== Personal life and death ==
Junker married Marlies Junker (née Marlies Nennker, born 1942) in 1997. He had a daughter, Ingeborg Junker (born 1959), and a son, Manfred Junker (1960–2023), both from his first marriage.

Junker died on 13 July 2024, at the age of 94.

== Writings ==
- Erwin Junker: Erwin Junker – The Manufacturer: My Life Story Books on Demand, Norderstedt 2018, ISBN 978-3-7528-7994-0
- Burg Windeck
