= Monika MacDonagh-Pajerová =

Czech activist, university teacher and diplomat

- Born: Monika Pajerová; 8 January 1966 (age 60); Janov, Czechoslovakia
- Education: Charles University
- Occupations: diplomat, pedagogue, university teacher
- Years active: 1989–present
- Spouse: Peter MacDonagh
- Children: Emma Smetana, Tomáš MacDonagh
- Relatives: Kateřina Jacques (sister); Jan Roth (great grandfather)

Monika MacDonagh-Pajerová (born 8 January 1966) is a Czech activist, university teacher and former diplomat. She was the leading personality from the 1989 Velvet Revolution and chairperson of the pro-European organization ANO pro Evropu (YES for Europe) which campaigned for Czech membership of the European Union and higher public understanding of European issues.

She is currently a lecturer in the Centre for International Education and Exchange CIEE attached to the Charles University in Prague.

== Biography ==
Monika MacDonagh-Pajerová was born on 8 January 1966 in Janov, Czechoslovakia (now the Czech Republic). She came to public prominence during the 1989 Velvet Revolution in Czechoslovakia, serving as the official spokesperson for University Strike Committee and was a founding member of the Civic Forum. She was a principal organiser and opening speaker at the mass demonstration on 17 November 1989 which is viewed as the starting point of the Revolution. Due to the prominence which she and other student leaders have played as critics of the later Czech politicians Václav Klaus, Miloš Zeman and Andrej Babiš and their closeness to Václav Havel there have been attempts by the supporters of Klaus, Zeman and Babis to claim that the students were compromised by the fact that they adopted a tactic used by German and Czech dissidents of getting permission for their demonstration.

Following 1989 she was a diplomat, serving at different times in the Czechoslovak embassy in Paris, member of the Minister's private office and official spokesperson for the Ministry (Director of the Press Department). She spent four years as principal official responsible for cultural matters in the Council of Europe. Subsequently she presented programmes on European affairs on the Czech Television and Czech Radio as well as leading the principal non-political organisation which successfully campaigned for a Yes vote in the 2004 referendum on accession to the European Union.

== Personal life ==
Her father is the photographer Ota Pajer. She has a doctorate from the Charles University, Prague specializing in literature. She has edited and contributed to various books on art, the Velvet Revolution, political culture and Europe. In 2000 she received a national book prize for a work with Czech Artist Jiří Kolář. Her sister, Kateřina Jacques is a former deputy chairperson of the Green Party and former member of the Chamber of Deputies of the Czech Parliament.

She is married and has two children.
