= Mělnická wine =

The sub-province Mělník (Czech: Mělnická podoblast) is one two wine regions in Bohemia and consists of 37 official wine municipalities. The sub-province is situated on the Elbe river. Although it is named after the town of Mělník in central Bohemia, it contains wineyards located in many parts of Bohemia - in Prague, around Čáslav, Roudnice nad Labem, even in Trutnov under the Giant Mountains. Simply said, all vineyards in Bohemia, that are not part of the sub-province Litoměřice, belong to the sub-province Mělník.

== Mělník ==
Mělník lies on the confluence of Elbe and Vltava rivers. This area has been known since the medieval for Pinot noir. This sort has been brought from Burgundy together with French wine growers.

== Prague ==
The wine production was very important for Prague. The vineyards produced wine for the royal court. The wine history of Prague is still present in local names, for example, one the Prague quarters is called Vinohrady (the Czech word for vineyards). However, wine production is recently somewhat less intensive. Small vineyards have remained in Trója or Malá Strana, the wine grown there is quite exclusive and expensive. The typical sort is Müller Thurgau.

== Other areas ==
Especially Roudnice nad Labem also has rich history of wineries. Vineyards may also be found around the towns of Čáslav, Kolín, Kutná Hora, Trutnov and Beroun (this only town lies southward of Prague and thus has no relation to Elbe river).
