= Janov (Děčín District) =

- Municipality
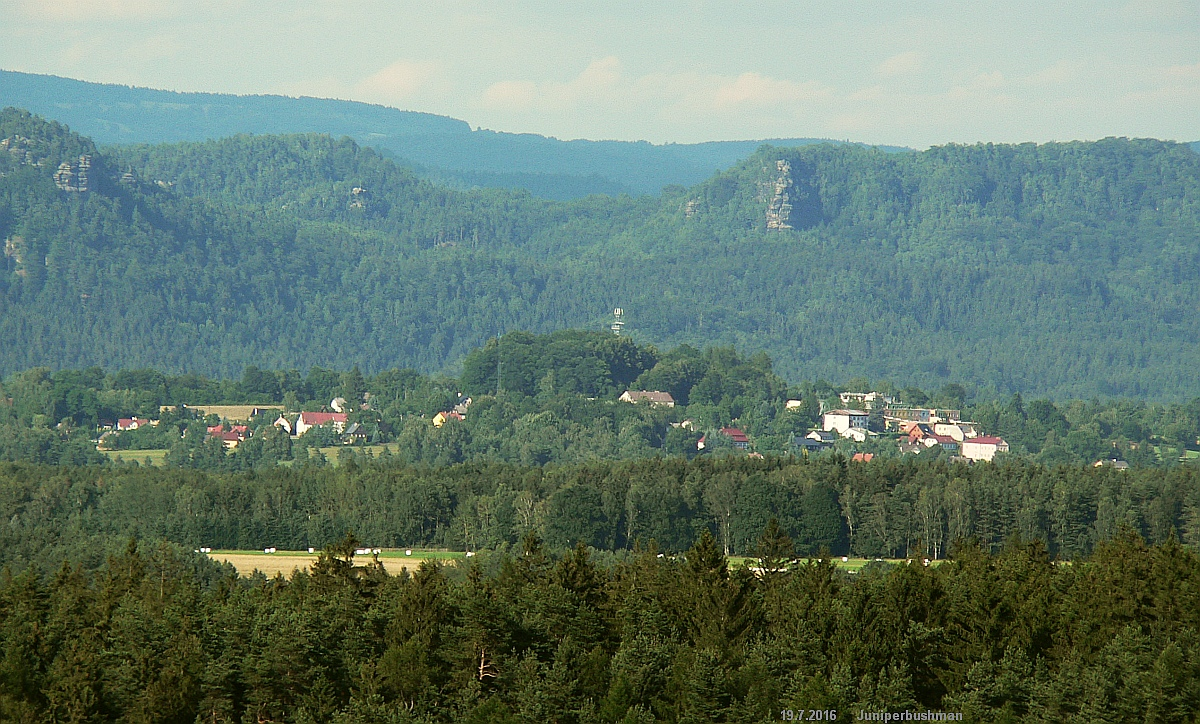
- General view

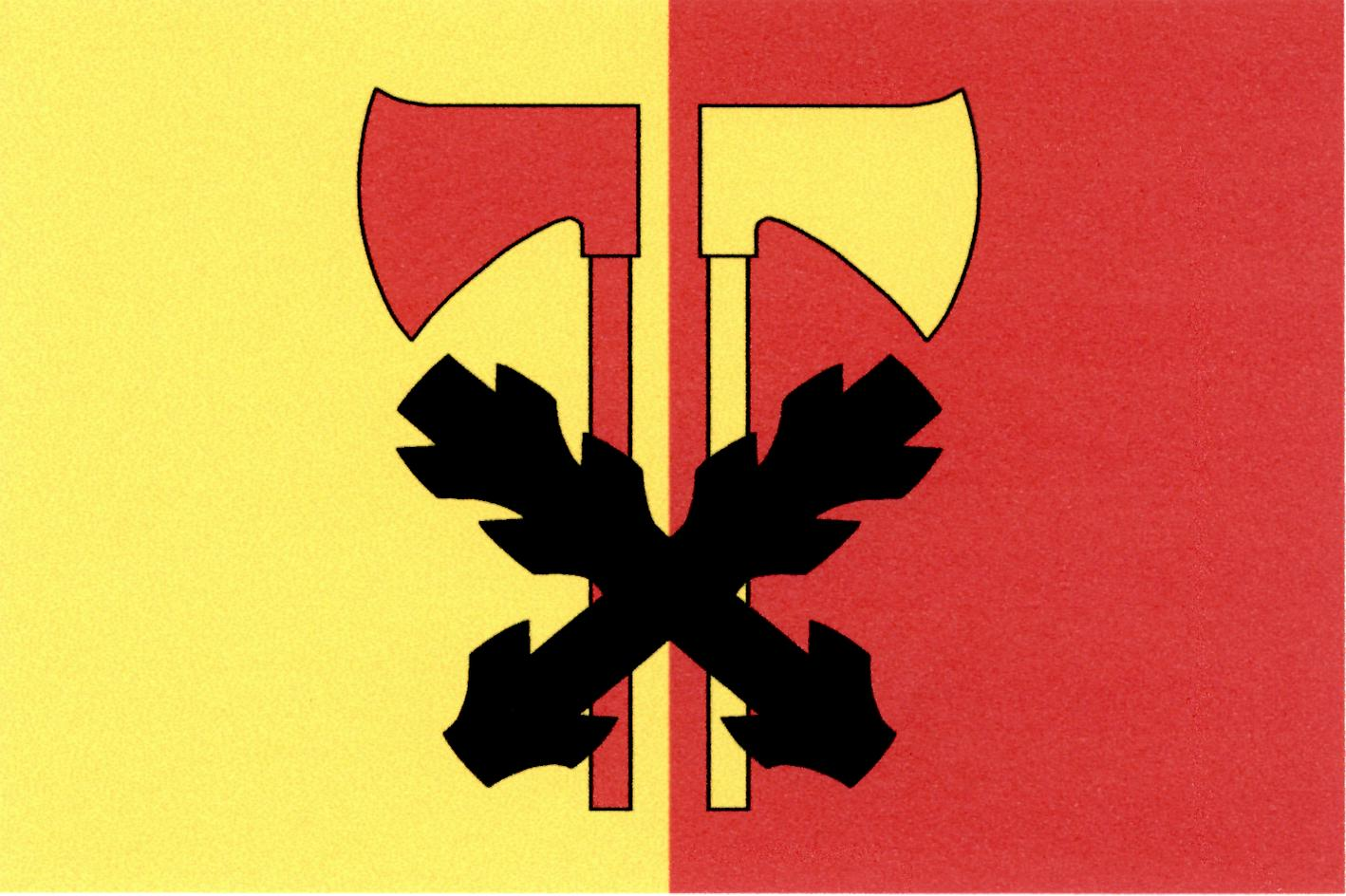
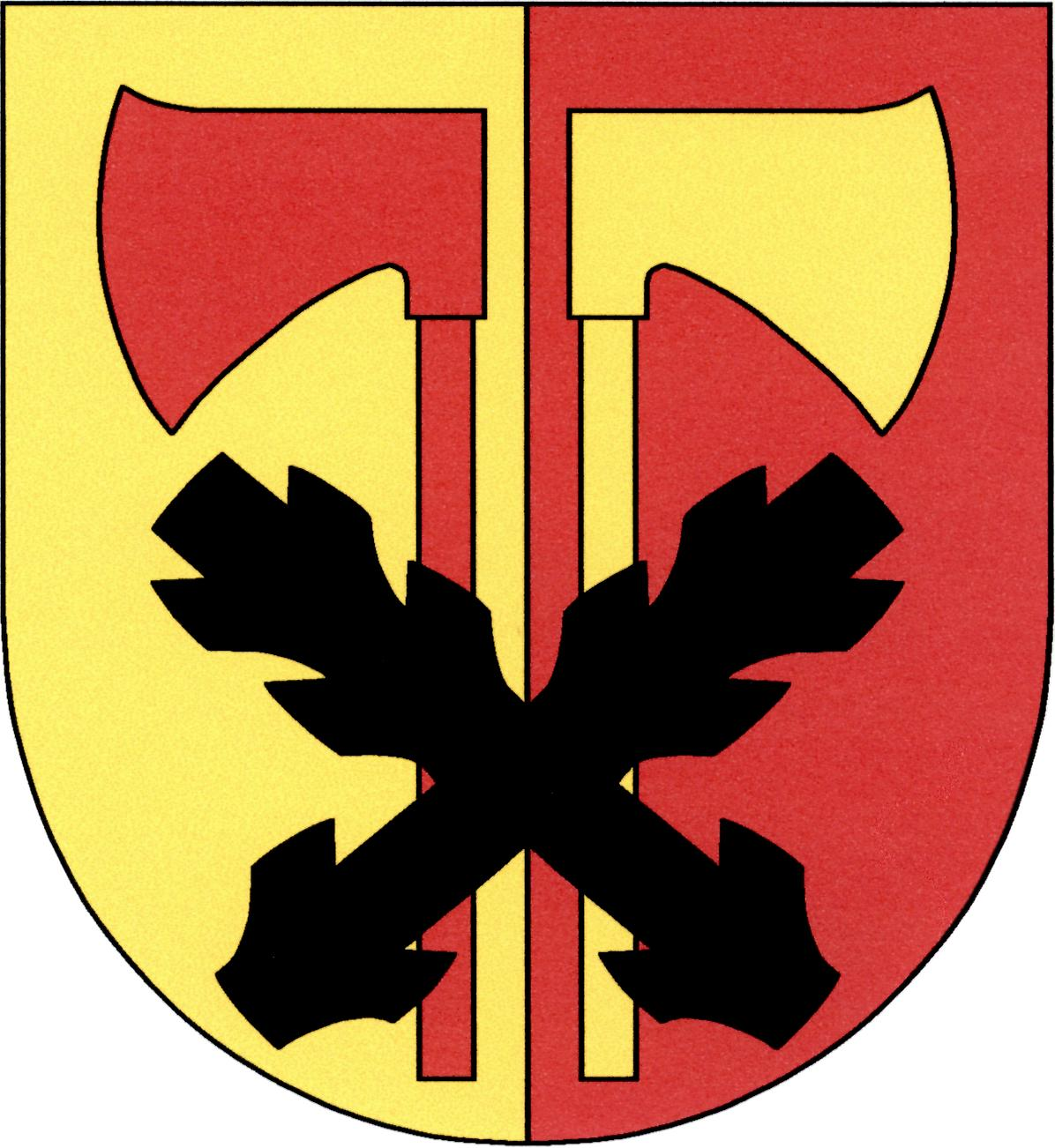
- Flag Coat of arms

- Location in the Czech Republic
- Coordinates: 50°51′37″N 14°15′55″E
- Country: Czech Republic
- Region: Ústí nad Labem
- District: Děčín
- First mentioned: 1446

Area
  - Total: 4.65 km^{2} (1.80 sq mi)
- Elevation: 321 m (1,053 ft)

Population (2026-01-01)
  - Total: 324
  - Density: 69.7/km^{2} (180/sq mi)
- Time zone: UTC+1 (CET)
  - Summer (DST): UTC+2 (CEST)
- Postal code: 405 02
- Website: www.janovuhrenska.cz

Janov (German: Jonsdorf) is a municipality and village in Děčín District in the Ústí nad Labem Region of the Czech Republic. It has about 300 inhabitants.

Janov lies approximately 13 kilometres (8 mi) north-east of Děčín, 28 km (17 mi) north-east of Ústí nad Labem, and 87 km (54 mi) north of Prague.

== Demographics ==
Historical population
Year	Pop.	±%
1869	1,124	—
1880	1,205	+7.2%
1890	1,177	−2.3%
1900	1,147	−2.5%
1910	1,213	+5.8%
1921	998	−17.7%
1930	962	−3.6%
1950	361	−62.5%
1961	295	−18.3%
1970	242	−18.0%
1980	163	−32.6%
1991	116	−28.8%
2001	185	+59.5%
2011	289	+56.2%
2021	315	+9.0%
Source: Censuses

== Notable people ==
- Monika MacDonagh-Pajerová (born 1966), activist
