= Minnesota Starvation Experiment =

1944–1945 US medical experiment

The Minnesota Starvation Experiment, also known as the Minnesota Semi-Starvation Experiment, the Minnesota Starvation-Recovery Experiment and the Starvation Study, was a clinical study performed at the University of Minnesota between November 19, 1944, and December 20, 1945. The investigation was designed to determine the physiological effects of severe and prolonged dietary restriction and the effectiveness of dietary rehabilitation strategies.

The purpose of the study was twofold: first, to produce a definitive treatise on the physical and psychological effects of prolonged, famine-like semi-starvation on healthy men, as well as subsequent effectiveness of dietary rehabilitation from this condition and, second, to use the scientific results produced to guide the Allied relief assistance to famine victims in Europe and Asia at the end of World War II. It was recognized early in 1944 that millions of people were in grave danger of mass famine as a result of the conflict, and information was needed regarding the effects of semi-starvation—and the impact of various rehabilitation strategies—if postwar relief efforts were to be effective.

The study was developed in coordination with the Civilian Public Service (CPS, 1941–1947) of conscientious objectors and the Selective Service System and used 36 men selected from a pool of over 200 CPS volunteers.

The study was divided into four phases: A twelve-week baseline control phase; a 24-week starvation phase, causing each participant to lose an average of 25% of his pre-starvation body weight; and two recovery phases, in which various rehabilitative diets were tried. The first rehabilitative stage was restricted by eating 2,000–3,000 calories a day. The second rehabilitative phase was unrestricted, letting the subjects eat as much food as they wanted.

Among the conclusions from the study was the confirmation that prolonged semi-starvation produces significant increases in depression, hysteria and hypochondriasis; most of the subjects experienced periods of severe emotional distress and depression. Participants exhibited a preoccupation with food, both during the starvation period and the rehabilitation phase. Sexual interest was drastically reduced, and the volunteers showed signs of social withdrawal and isolation.

Preliminary pamphlets containing key results from the Minnesota Starvation Experiment were used by aid workers in Europe and Asia in the months after World War II. In 1950, Ancel Keys and colleagues published the results in a two-volume, 1,385 page text entitled The Biology of Human Starvation (University of Minnesota Press).

This study was independent of the much broader Warsaw Ghetto Hunger Study performed in 1942 in the Warsaw Ghetto by 28 doctors of The Jewish Hospital in Warsaw. Their results were published in 1946.

== Principal investigators ==
Physiologist Ancel Keys was the lead investigator of the Minnesota Starvation Experiment. He was directly responsible for the X-ray analysis and administrative work and the general supervision of the activities in the Laboratory of Physiological Hygiene which he had founded at the University of Minnesota in 1940 after leaving positions at the Harvard Fatigue Laboratory and the Mayo Clinic. Starting in 1941, he served as a special assistant to the U.S. Secretary of War and worked with the Army to develop rations for troops in combat, the K-rations. Keys was Director for the Laboratory of Physiological Hygiene for 26 years, retired in 1972 and died in 2004 at the age of 100.

Olaf Mickelsen, a biochemist with a Ph.D. from the University of Wisconsin in 1939, was responsible for the chemical analyses conducted in the Laboratory of Physiological Hygiene during the Starvation Study, and the daily dietary regime of the CPS subjects—including the supervision of the kitchen and its staff. During the study, he was an associate professor of biochemistry and physiological hygiene at the University of Minnesota.

Henry Longstreet Taylor, with a Ph.D. from the University of Minnesota in 1941, had the major responsibility of recruiting the 36 CPS volunteers and maintaining the morale of the participants and their involvement in the study. During the study he collaborated with Austin Henschel in conducting the physical performance, respiration and postural tests. He joined the faculty at the Laboratory of Physiological Hygiene, where he held a joint appointment with the Department of Physiology. His research concentrated on problems in cardiovascular physiology, temperature regulation, metabolism, nutrition, aging, and cardiovascular epidemiology.

Austin Henschel shared the responsibility of screening the CPS volunteers with Taylor for selection, had charge of the blood morphology, and scheduling all the tests and measurements of the subjects during the course of the study. He was a member of the faculty in the Laboratory of Physiological Hygiene and the Department of Medicine at the University of Minnesota.

Josef M. Brožek (1913–2004) was responsible for psychological studies during the Starvation Study, including the psychomotor tests, anthropometric measurements, and statistical analysis of the results. He received his Ph.D. in psychology from Charles University in Prague, Czechoslovakia, in 1937 and emigrated to the United States in 1939. He joined the Laboratory of Physiological Hygiene at the University of Minnesota in 1941, where he served in a succession of positions over a 17-year period. His research concerned malnutrition and behavior, visual illumination and performance, and aging.

== Methods ==
=== Recruitment of volunteers ===
The experiment was planned in cooperation with the Civilian Public Service (CPS) and the Selective Service System, using volunteers selected from the ranks of conscientious objectors who had been inducted into public wartime service. Ancel Keys obtained approval from the War Department to select participants from the CPS. Availability of a sufficient number of healthy volunteers willing to subject themselves to the year-long invasion of privacy, nutritional deprivation, and physical and mental hardship was essential for the successful execution of the experiment.

In early 1944, a recruitment brochure was drafted and distributed within the network of CPS work camps throughout the United States. Over 400 men volunteered to participate in the study as an alternative to military service; of these, about 100 were selected for examination. Taylor, Brožek, and Henschel from the Minnesota Laboratory of Physiological Hygiene traveled to the various CPS units to interview the potential candidates and administer physical and psychological tests to the volunteers.

Thirty-six men were ultimately selected who demonstrated evidence of the required mental and physical health, the ability to get along reasonably well within a group while enduring deprivation and hardship, and sufficient commitment to the relief and rehabilitation objectives of the investigation to complete the study. All subjects were white males, with ages ranging from 22 to 33 years old.

Of the 36 volunteer subjects, 15 were members of the Historic Peace Churches (Mennonites, Church of the Brethren and Quakers). Others there included Methodists, Presbyterians, Baptists, and one of each who was Jewish, Episcopalian, Evangelical & Reformed, Disciples of Christ, Congregational, and Evangelical Mission Covenant, along with two participants without a declared religion.

The 36 CPS participants in the Minnesota Starvation Experiment were: William Anderson, Harold Blickenstaff, Wendell Burrous, Edward Cowles, George Ebeling, Carlyle Frederick, Jasper Garner, Lester Glick, James Graham, Earl Heckman, Roscoe Hinkle, Max Kampelman, Sam Legg, Phillip Liljengren, Howard Lutz, Robert McCullagh, William McReynolds, Dan Miller, L. Wesley Miller, Richard Mundy, Daniel Peacock, James Plaugher, Woodrow Rainwater, Donald Sanders, Cedric (Henry) Scholberg, Charles Smith, William Stanton, Raymond Summers, Marshall Sutton, Kenneth Tuttle, Robert Villwock, William Wallace, Franklin Watkins, W. Earl Weygandt, Robert Wiloughby, and Gerald Wilsnack.

=== Study period and phases ===
The 12-month clinical study was performed at the University of Minnesota Laboratory of Physiological Hygiene between November 19, 1944 and December 20, 1945. Throughout the duration of the study each man was assigned specific work tasks, was expected to walk 22 miles (35 km) each week and required to keep a personal diary. An extensive battery of tests was periodically administered, including the collection of metabolic and physical measurements; X-ray examinations; treadmill performance; and intelligence and psychological evaluation.

The study was divided into four distinct phases:

1. Control Period (12 weeks): This was a standardization period when the subjects received a controlled diet of approximately 3,200 calories of food each day. The diet of the subjects who were close to their "ideal" weight was adjusted so as to maintain caloric balance, while the diets of the underweight and overweight individuals was adjusted so as to bring them close to their ideal weight. On average, the group ended up slightly below their "ideal" weight. In addition, the clinical staff of the Laboratory of Physiological Hygiene routinely conducted a series of anthropometric, physiological and psychological tests designed to characterize the physical and mental health of each participant under normal conditions.
2. Semi-Starvation Period (24 weeks until July 28, 1945): During the 6-month semi-starvation period, each subject's dietary intake was immediately cut in half to about 1,560 calories per day. If he didn't lose enough weight, his calorie intake was cut further. His meals were composed of foods that were expected to typify the diets of people in Europe during the latter stages of the war: potatoes, rutabagas, turnips, bread and macaroni. On July 30, 1945, a photo published in Life magazine showed the shirtless, bony participants.
3. Restricted Rehabilitation Period (12 weeks): The participants were divided into four groups of eight men; each group received a strictly-controlled rehabilitation diet, consisting of one of four different caloric energy levels. In each energy-level group, the men were further subdivided into subgroups receiving differing regimens of protein and vitamin supplements. In this manner, the clinical staff examined various energy, protein and vitamin strategies for re-nourishing the subjects from the conditions of famine.
4. Unrestricted Rehabilitation Period (8 weeks): For the final rehabilitation period, caloric intake and food content was unrestricted but carefully recorded and monitored.

During the starvation period, the subjects received two meals per day designed to induce the same level of nutritional stress for each participant. Since each subject had distinct metabolic characteristics, the diet of each man was adjusted throughout the starvation period to produce roughly a 25% total weight loss over the 24-week period.

The researchers tracked each subject's weight as a function of time elapsed since the beginning of the starvation period. For each subject, the weight versus time plot was expected—as well as enforced—to form a particular curve, the prediction weight-loss curve, whose characteristics were decided before the commencement of the experiment. The postulated curves turned out to be quite predictive for most subjects.

If a subject veered off his curve in any given week, his caloric intake for the next week would be adjusted, by varying the amount of bread and potatoes, to bring him back to the curve. The required adjustments were usually minor. The shapes of the curves were chosen "based on the concept that the rate of weight loss would progressively decrease and reach a relative plateau" at the final weight.

For each subject, the weight vs. time curve was taken to be quadratic in time (in fact, an upward-opening parabola) with the minimum located at 24 weeks, at which point the weight is supposed to be equal to the final target body weight (the minimum is where the curve has zero slope; this corresponds to the "plateau" mentioned above). Mathematically, this means that the curve for each subject was given by

$$W(t)=W_{f}+K\, (24-t)^{2},$$

where $t$ is the time (measured in weeks) elapsed since the beginning of the starvation period, $W(t)$ is the subject's weight at time $t$, and $W_{f}$ is the final weight that the subject was supposed to reach at the end of the 24-week period. The constant $K$ is determined by the requirement that $W(t=0)$ be the initial weight $W_{i}$, i.e. by solving

$$W_{i}=W_{f}+K\, (24-0)^{2}$$

for $K$; this gives

$$K=\frac{W_{i}-W_{f}}{24^{2}}$$.

The authors expressed this in terms of the percent total weight loss $P$,

$$P=100 \times \frac{W_{i}-W_{f}}{W_{i}}$$

(which, as stated above, was supposed to be about 25% for all subjects), obtaining

$$K=\frac{P}{100 \times 24^{2}}\,W_{i}$$.

== Results ==
Preliminary pamphlets containing key results from the Minnesota Starvation Experiment were produced and used extensively by aid workers in Europe and Asia in the months after World War II.

In 1950, the full report of results from the Minnesota Starvation Experiment was published in a two-volume, 1,385-page text titled The Biology of Human Starvation, University of Minnesota Press. The 50-chapter work contains an extensive analysis of the physiological and psychological data collected during the study, and a comprehensive literature review.

Two subjects were dismissed for failing to maintain the dietary restrictions imposed during the starvation phase of the experiment, and the data for two others were not used in the analysis of the results.

Among the conclusions from the study was the confirmation that prolonged semi-starvation produces significant increases in depression, hysteria and hypochondriasis as measured using the Minnesota Multiphasic Personality Inventory. Most of the subjects experienced periods of severe emotional distress and depression.

The rehabilitation phase proved to be psychologically the hardest phase for most of the men, with extreme effects including self-mutilation, where one subject, Sam Legg, amputated three fingers of his hand with an axe, though the subject was unsure if he had done so intentionally or accidentally. Participants exhibited a preoccupation with food, both during the starvation period and the rehabilitation phase. Sexual interest was drastically reduced, and the volunteers showed signs of social withdrawal and isolation.

The participants reported a decline in concentration, comprehension and judgment capabilities, although the standardized tests administered showed no actual signs of diminished capacity. There were marked declines in physiological processes indicative of decreases in each subject's basal metabolic rate (the energy required by the body in a state of rest), reflected in reduced body temperature, respiration and heart rate. Some of the subjects exhibited edema in their extremities.

== Related work ==
One of the crucial observations of the Minnesota Starvation Experiment discussed by a number of researchers in the nutritional sciences—including Ancel Keys—is that the physical effects of the induced semi-starvation during the study closely approximate the conditions experienced by people with a range of eating disorders such as anorexia nervosa and bulimia nervosa. As a result of the study it has been postulated that many of the profound social and psychological effects of these disorders may result from undernutrition, and recovery depends on physical re-nourishment as well as psychological treatment.

== See also ==
- Dieting
- Eating disorders
- Human subject research

== Bibliography ==
- Handbook for the Treatment of Eating Disorders, D.M. Gardner and P.E. Garfinkel (editors), Gilford Press, New York, N.Y., 1997.
- Kalm, Leah M.; Semba, Richard D. "They starved so that others can be fed better: Remembering Ancel Keys and the Minnesota Experiment," Journal of Nutrition, Vol. 135, June 2005, 1347–1352.
- Keys, A., Brozek, J., Henschel, A., Mickelsen, O., & Taylor, H. L., The Biology of Human Starvation (2 volumes), University of Minnesota Press, 1950.
- Palesty, J. A.; Dudrick, S. J. "The Goldilocks Paradigm of Starvation and Refeeding," Nutrition in Clinical Practice, April 1, 2006; 21(2): 147 – 154.
- Tucker, Todd. The Great Starvation Experiment: The Heroic Men Who Starved so That Millions Could Live, Free Press, A Division of Simon & Schuster, Inc., New York, New York, ISBN 978-0-7432-7030-4, 2006.
