= Kateřina Jacques =

Czech politician

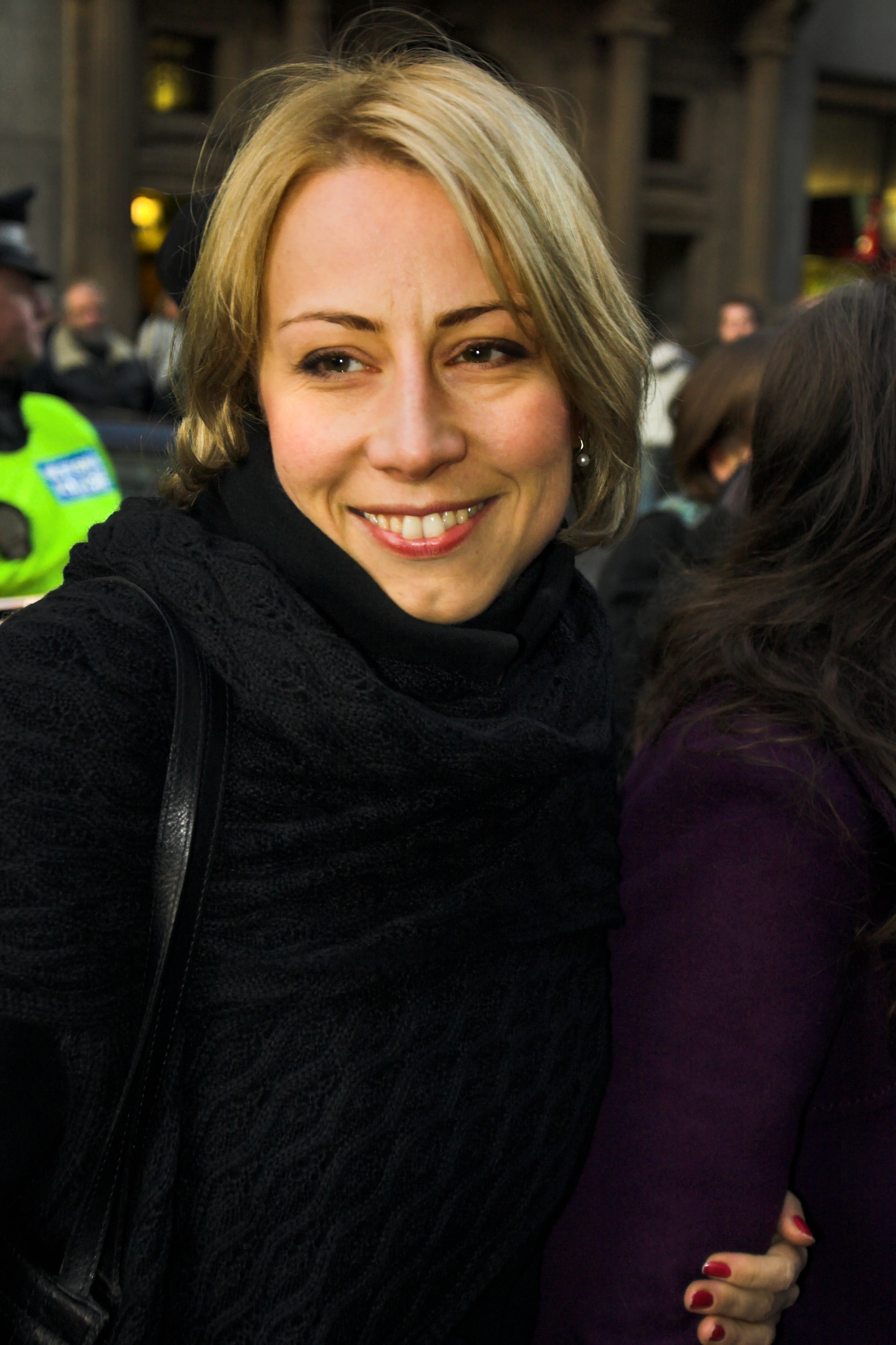
Kateřina Jacques

Kateřina Jacques (Czech pronunciation: [ˈkatɛr̝ɪna ˈʒak]) (born 2 June 1971) is a Czech Green Party politician. She was elected to the lower house of the Parliament of the Czech Republic in the June 2006 election, representing the Prague electoral district. Before the election she was director of the human rights section of the prime minister's office. She gained media attention when she was assaulted by a policeman while protesting against a neo-Nazi rally on 1 May 2006.

== Biography ==
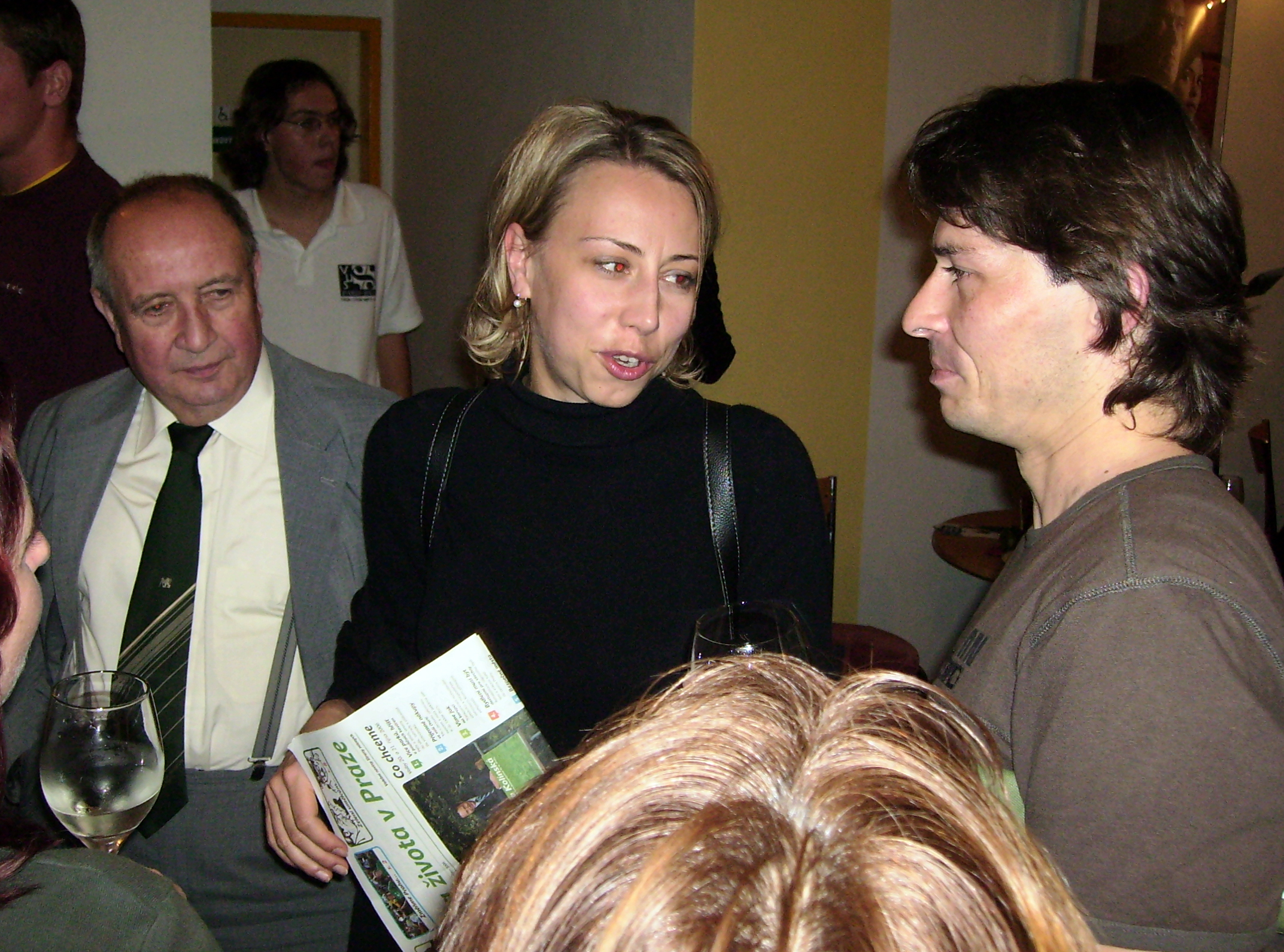
Kateřina Jaques in Klánovice, 2006

Kateřina Jacques was born Kateřina Pajerová in the central Bohemian town of Mělník. Her father is Ota Pajer, a photographer and brother of the documentary photographer Alan Pajer; her older sister is Monika MacDonagh-Pajerová, a diplomat and political activist. After finishing secondary school in 1990, she worked as an au pair in Germany while studying at the Free University of Berlin. She met her French husband Christian Jacques there, and they lived together for a year (1997–1998) in Strasbourg, where she studied. She used the surname Jacques-Pajerová for a time, but later adopted his family name Jacques without the suffix -ová, which is customary in Czech for female surnames, when this was allowed by a change in the Czech registry law. They have two children, Nina (born 1994) and Sebastian Maxmilian (born 1995).

From 1994 to 2002 she studied political science and German translation at Charles University in Prague, working as a translator and interpreter during her studies. Her master's thesis Comparison of Palacký's interpretation of selected themes in Czech and German edition of his »Czech History« (Srovnání Palackého výkladů vybraných témat v českém a německém vydání jeho »Českých dějin«) won the university's Bolzano Prize. After graduation she worked in the German Academic Exchange Service. In 2006 she gained a professional doctorate in political science.

Since 2003 she has worked in the Czech government's office. In 2005 she was appointed cabinet director of deputy prime minister Pavel Němec. A year later she became director of the office for human rights and equal opportunities.

In April 2005 at a seminar about national minorities Jacques defended a government promotional campaign against racism, which was criticised for advocating integration of the Romani people.

Kateřina Jacques joined the Green Party in spring 2005 and was elected to the central revision committee at their congress in August 2005. In the primary election in January 2006 she received the second eligible place on the Green ticket, just after chairman Martin Bursík. The Green Party places emphasis on representation of women, and the young and photogenic Jacques was featured in Prague election campaign posters and was accompanied by Bursík on billboards of the Green Party. She received 6,926 preferential votes (11.46% of the total for the Green Party), 185 more than Bursík, so she overtook him in the order for assigning mandates.

In 2015 she married Bursík; their daughter was born in 2009.

== May Day incident ==
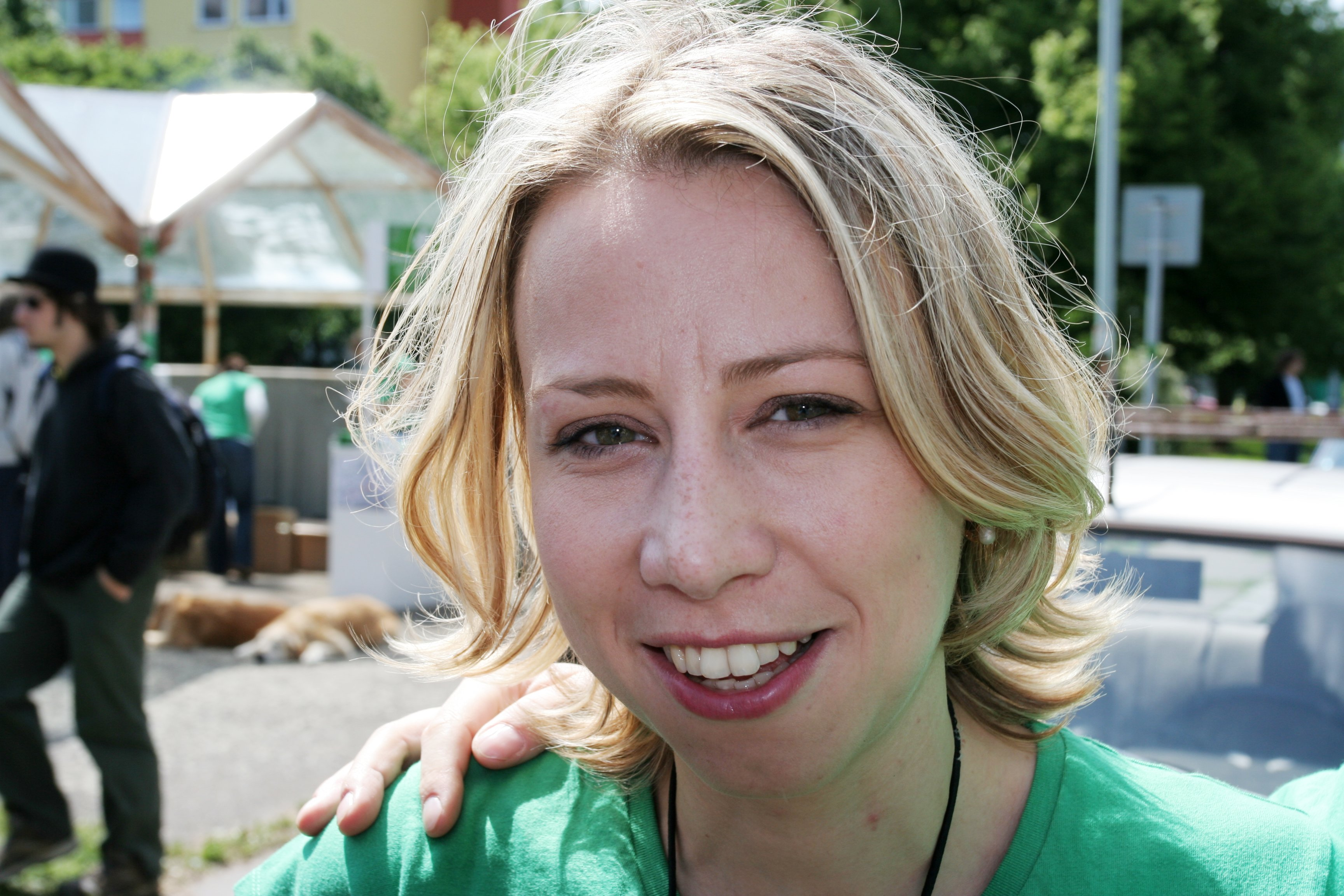
Kateřina Jacques on election campaign of Green Party, 28 May 2006

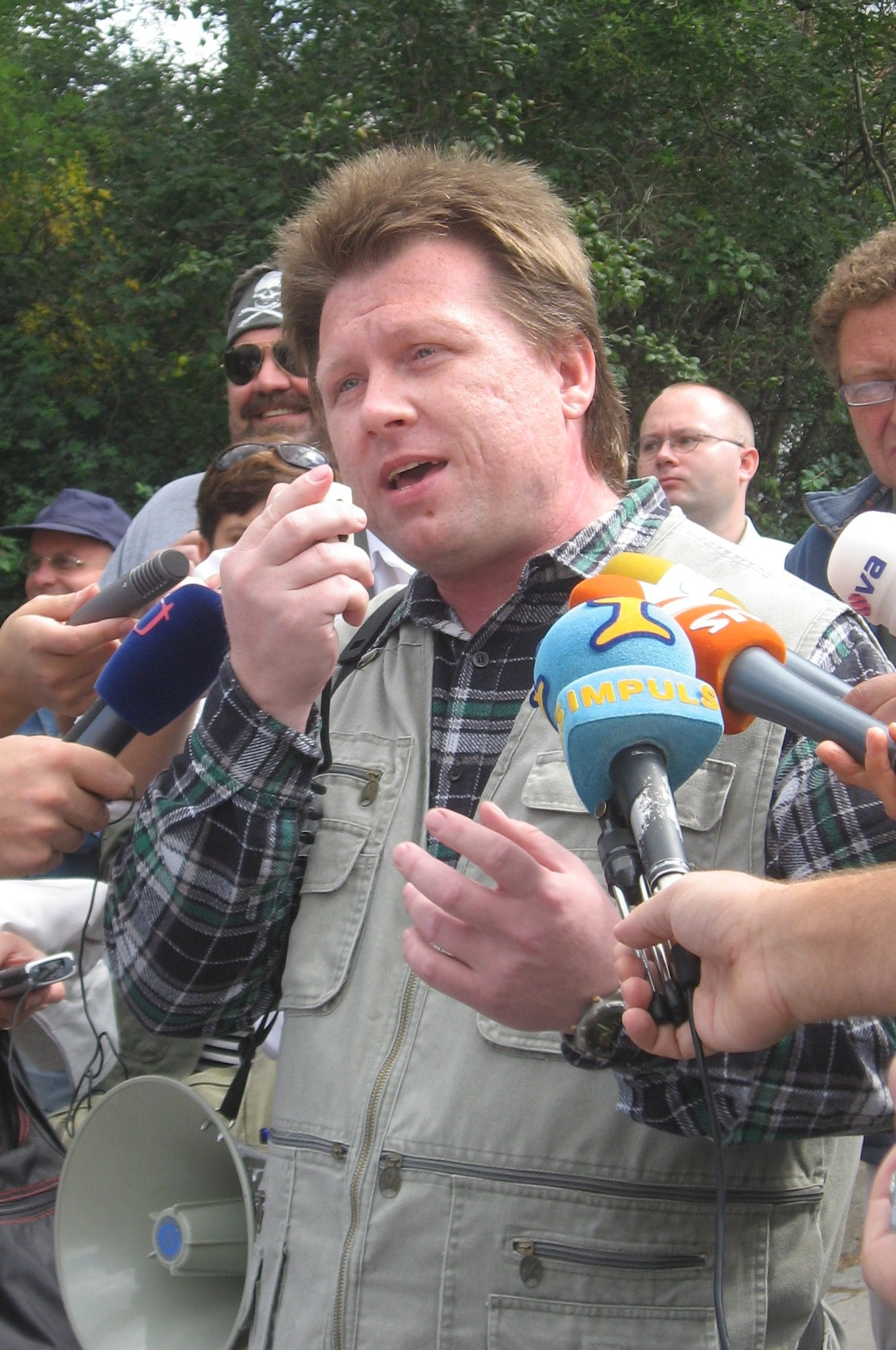
Tomáš Čermák

On 1 May 2006, neo-nazi group Národní odpor (transl. National Resistance) announced a demonstration on Palacký Square in Prague, which wasn't banned by the authorities despite human rights activists' objections. A group of Green Party members participated in the protest actions at the place guarded by police, which separated neo-Nazis and their opponents. When they followed departing National Resistance members to Karlovo náměstí, Jacques got into conflict with the police officer Tomáš Čermák from the local police department, which had relieved hoplites from special police forces. Čermák claims that he used compulsory means (when arresting her), when Jacques did not comply to his prompts to stop provoking violence; according to her and several witnesses, she was beaten without justification, however these claims were disputed. Following the incident, one photographer was detained and escorted to a police station.

Hana Marvanová, a member of the Parliament for the Freedom Union–Democratic Union declared that she witnessed the incident from a tram, which had stopped nearby. She said she saw one of the policemen suddenly run towards a woman and drag her down to the ground. She did not see the beating because other policemen surrounded them.

There was a strong public reaction when the video was broadcast; Prime Minister Jiří Paroubek said that the behaviour of the police was unacceptable. An investigation by The Ministry of Interior found that Čermák should be prosecuted on three charges: abuse of authority, injury, and restraint of personal freedom. On 9 August 2006 Čermák asked the President for a pardon. Čermák was found not guilty by the first level court. In the following trial, Čermák's case was brought by the state prosecutor to appeal court which finally confirmed the first level court's decision. On 23 August Čermák's advocate Jaroslav Janeček sued Kateřina Jacques for assaulting a policeman (together with her colleague Petr Slunéčko), false allegation, and false testimony. He also claimed that the incident was arranged by her to draw attention to herself and her political party before the election.
