= Jiří Hoskovec =

Czech professor of psychology

Jiří Hoskovec

Jiří Hoskovec (19 February 1933 – 11 July 2011) was a Czech professor of psychology, specializing mainly in the psychology of transport and the history of psychology. He is the author and co-author of 36 books and numerous articles in the area of general and applied psychology. He was editor-in-chief of the journal Československá psychologie (Czechoslovak Psychology) and was co-editor of several scientific journals in various countries.
