= Junker Group =

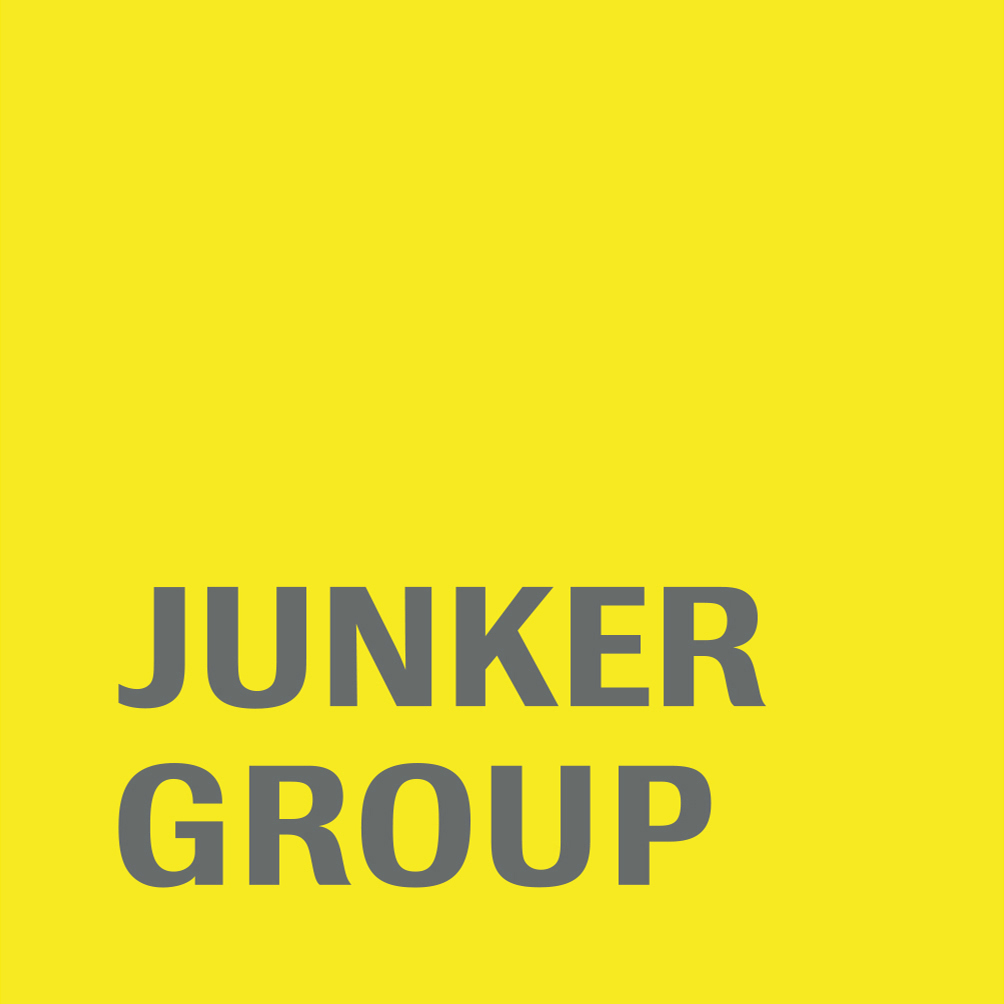
- Company type: GmbH
- Industry: Mechanical engineering
- Founded: 1962
- Founder: Manufacturer Erwin Junker
- Headquarters: Nordrach, Germany
- Number of employees: 1500
- Website: junker-group.com

The JUNKER Group is a company group consisting of the brands JUNKER, LTA, and ZEMA. It manufactures machines for CBN and corundum grinding, and filtration systems for industrial air purification.

== History ==
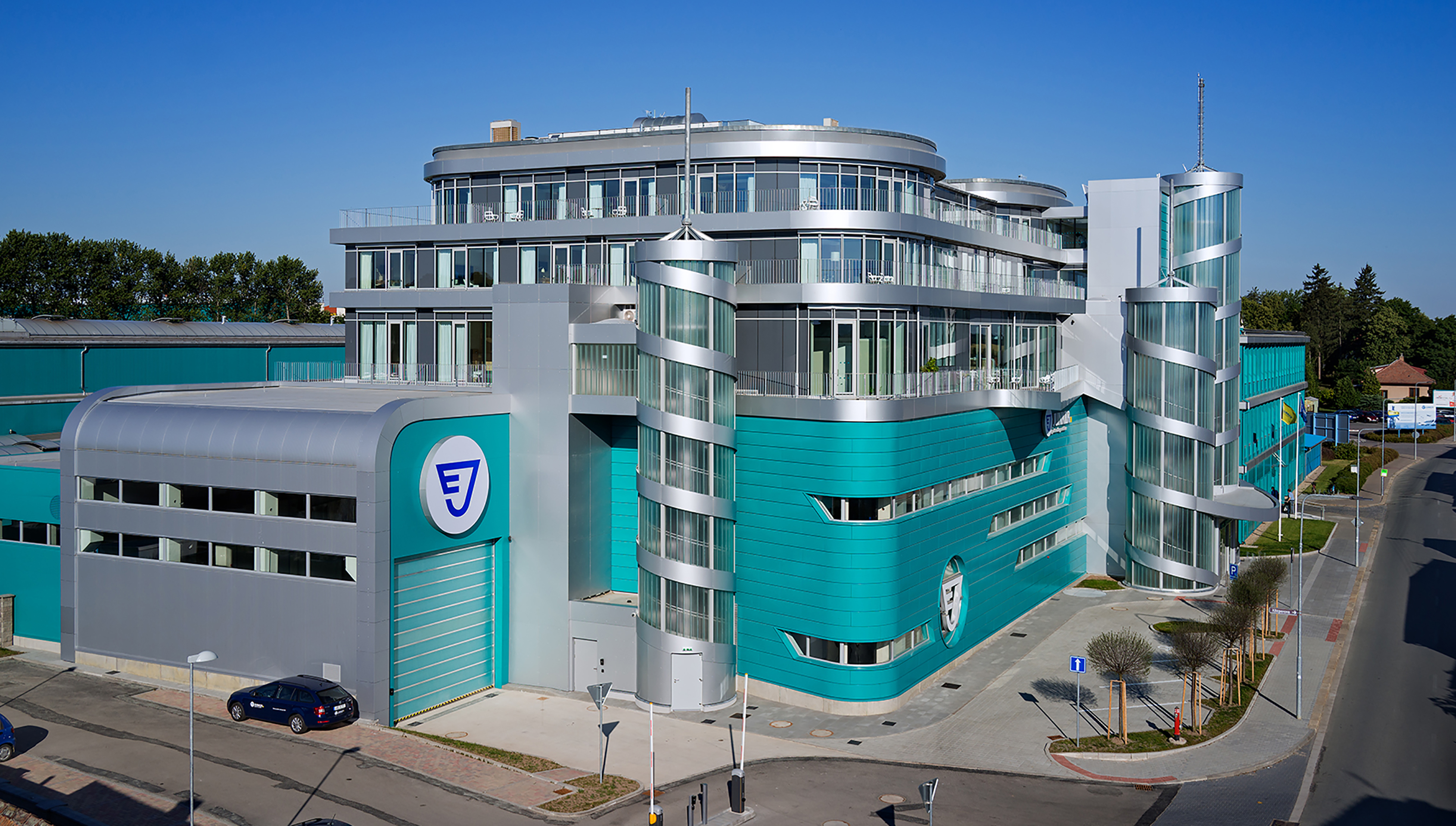
Site in Holice

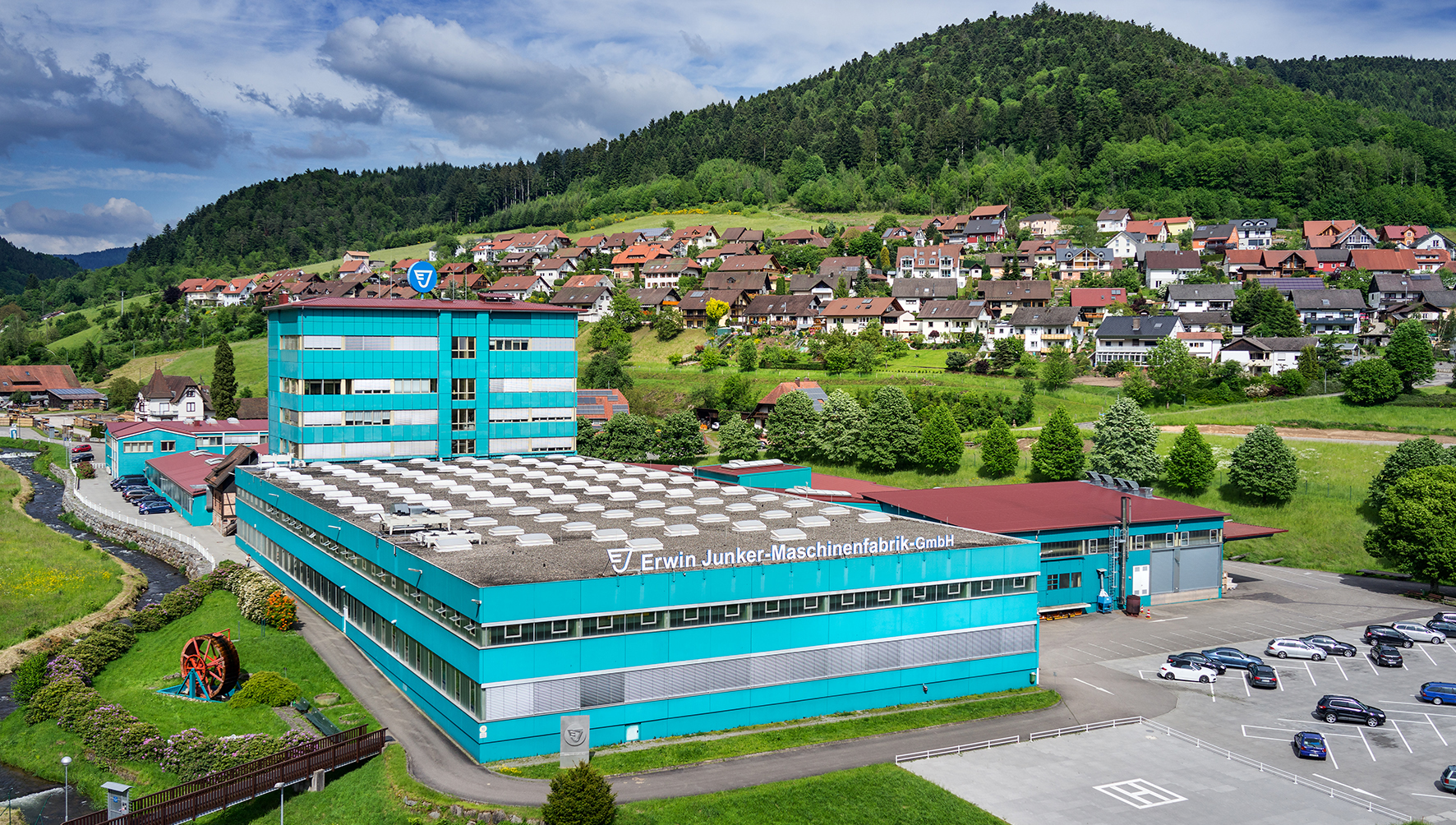
Headquarters in Nordrach

Erwin Junker founded his company, Erwin Junker Maschinen- und Apparatebau, in 1962. In 1977, the first sales offices were opened in Germany and the USA. In 1980, LTA Lufttechnik GmbH, a manufacturer of filtration systems, was founded in Achern, Germany. In 1992, Erwin Junker acquired three Czech manufacturers of grinding machines and subsequently the JUNKER Group was formed. In 1995, JUNKER opened a Technology Center in Nordrach. This represented a crucial step in the development of the Group and underscored its commitment to Germany as a center for technology. That same year, LTA Lufttechnik GmbH became a part of the JUNKER Group. In 2003, a branch office was established in Shanghai. In 2007, the Czech locations were merged to become Erwin Junker Grinding Technology a.s. with headquarters in Mělník. This site was expanded several times over subsequent years. In 2009, the JUNKER Group opened a Sales and Service office in India. This was followed by a Sales and Service office in Brazil two years later, the branch office in Russia in 2012, and the branch office in Mexico in 2014. The Brazilian grinding machine manufacturer ZEMA Zselics Ltda. also became part of the company group in 2015. The JUNKER Group headquarters is in Nordrach, near Offenburg, Germany. In addition, production sites can be found in Mělník, Holice, Čtyřkoly und Středokluky (Czech Republic). There are further Sales and Service offices in Brazil, China, Germany, India, Mexico, Russia, the Czech Republic, Turkey, and the USA. In May 2015, the Erwin Junker Technical Academy was opened in Holice to train qualified workers. This also includes the Erwin Junker Hotel and the Quickpoint Restaurant. In 2016, the Erwin Junker manufacturer foundation was set up. In the same year, the LTA Industrial Air Cleaning company was founded in the United States and the following year LTA Industrial Air Cleaning Systems s.r.o. was founded in the Czech Republic. This also includes the Erwin Junker Hotel and the Quickpoint Restaurant. In 2016, the Erwin Junker manufacturer foundation was set up. In the same year, the LTA Industrial Air Cleaning company was founded in the United States and the following year, 2017, LTA Industrial Air Cleaning Systems s.r.o. was opened in the Czech Republic.

== Innovations ==
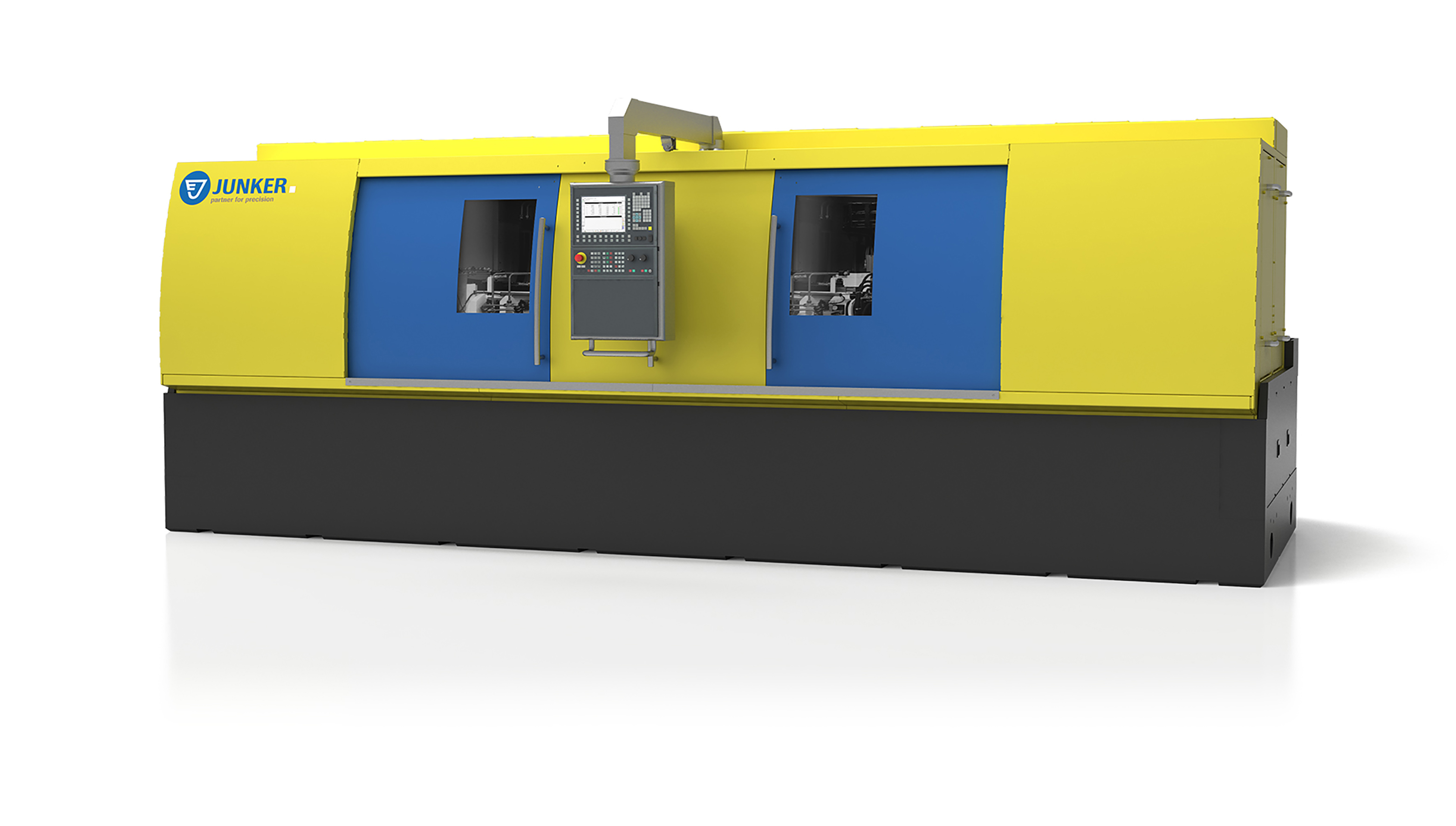
JUCENTER machine

JUNKER has been shaping grinding technology since 1962 with patented processes and new technologies. A few years after the company was founded, JUNKER launched a new invention, the first fully automatic flute grinding machine for thread taps, onto the market. In 1978, JUNKER laid the foundation for later developments with the introduction of CBN high-speed grinding machines. In the mid-1980s, the company entered into the automotive industry with well-selling creations; in 1984, JUNKER invented the QUICKPOINT machine, among others. With this new point grinding, it was suddenly possible to handle a variety of different contours in just a single clamping operation. The computer-controlled grinding wheel moves along the programmed contour with pinpoint accuracy and machines almost any material from plastic to carbide. In 2003, JUNKER launched the first CBN high-speed grinding machine for complete machining of crankshafts in a single clamping set-up onto the market (the JUCRANK machine model). In 2008, JUNKER made yet another machine, the JUCENTER model. The CBN high-speed grinding machine combines two stations (additional machining options) under one hood.

== Business areas ==
The JUNKER Group operates in the following business areas: machines, services, technology and equipment.

== Awards and distinctions ==
The JUNKER Group has at least 80 patents and has been presented with a few awards. These include the VW “Formula Q” quality award (1998) and being named “Leader of Technology” by Tianrun (2012) and Chery Automobile Co., Ltd. (2013). In Shanghai, the JUNKER Group was presented with the “Best Supplier Award” by SAIC General Motors Co., Ltd. (every year from 2014 to 2017). The company also received the “Global Supplier Award” from Robert Bosch GmbH in 2015 and an award from Getrag B.V. & Co. KG in 2017. The following year, JUNKER was honoured with the "Best Supplier Award" by Zhejiang Geely Automobile Parts & Components for the "extension of the production capacity". In 2019, they were the recipients of another award; in March, JUNKER received a high honour, the "Excellence Award", as the only European machine supplier.

== Technical Academy, Holice ==
In 2015, the JUNKER Group founded the Technical Academy in Holice, Czech Republic, as a response to the shortage of technically trained workers in the labour market there. In June 2017, the first year group completed their two-year training.
