= Gallery of Fine Arts in Cheb =

Art museum in Cheb, Czech Republic

- Galerie výtvarného umění v Chebu
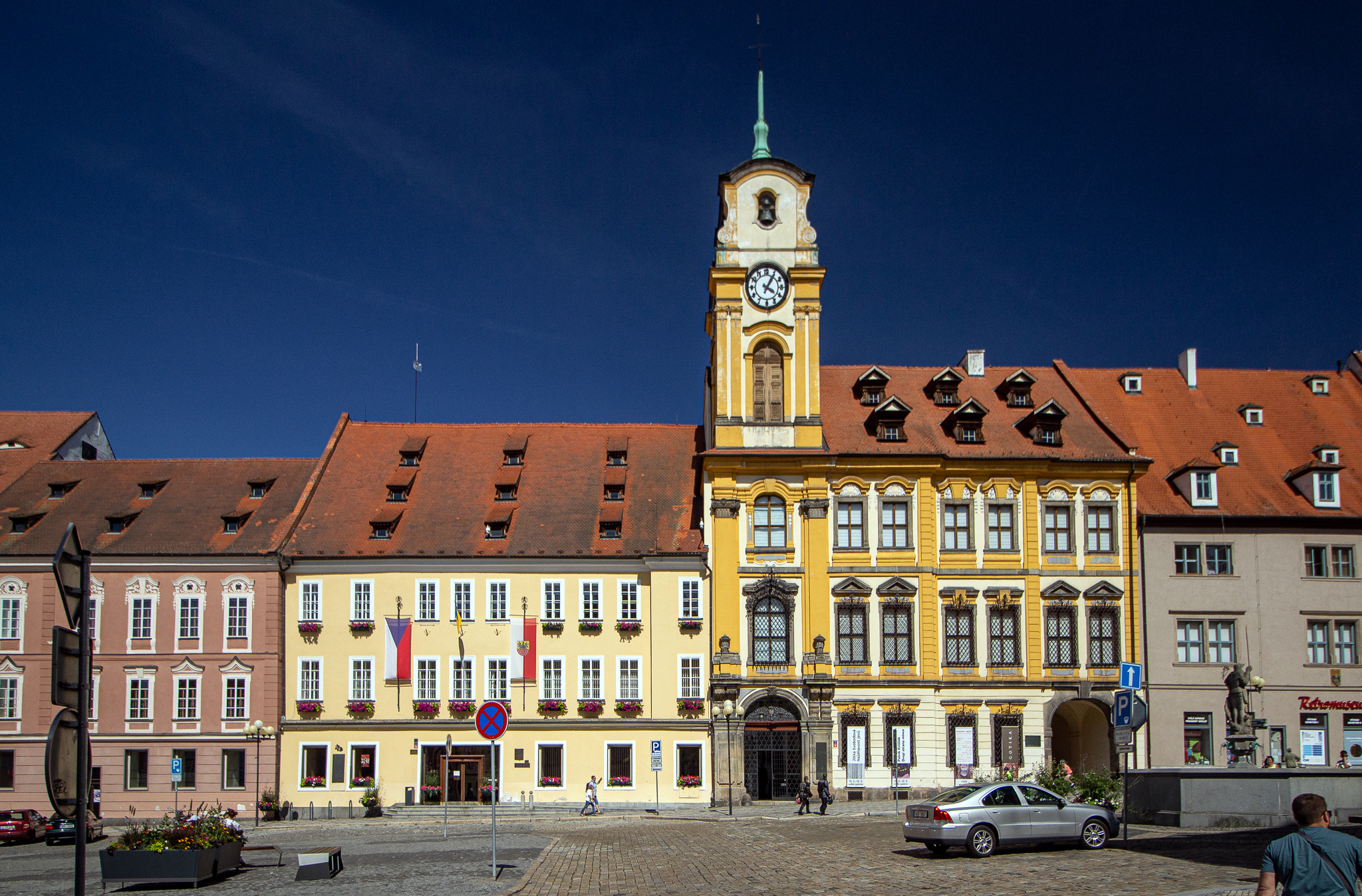
- New Town Hall where GAVU is headquartered
- Established: 1962
- Location: Krále Jiřího z Poděbrad Square No. 10/16, Cheb (former Town Hall)
- Coordinates: 50°04′44″N 12°22′17″E
- Key holdings: Czech gothic art, Modern art since the 19th century
- Director: Marcel Fišer
- Owner: Karlovy Vary Region

Gallery of Fine Arts in Cheb (Czech: Galerie výtvarného umění v Chebu, abbreviated GAVU) is an art gallery in Cheb in the Czech Republic. It is a subsidiary organization of the Karlovy Vary Region. It is located in the New Town Hall on the main town square in Cheb. Its permanent exhibition features a collection of Gothic art from the Cheb region and a collection of Czech modern art from the 19th to 21st centuries, which has been built up from the mid-1960s to the present. In 2016, it has also founded the Retromuseum, which focuses on post-war design and lifestyle and is located in the neighboring Schiller House. In the past, the gallery also used exhibition spaces in the deconsecrated churches of St. Clare and St. Bartholomew in Cheb.

== History ==
The State Gallery of Fine Arts in Cheb was founded in 1962 as part of a network of regional galleries under the administration of the Ministry of Education and Culture. The gallery was founded by art historian and conservator Mira Mladějovská, who was the head of the town archives and the Cheb Museum from 1946 to 1951. From 1950 to 1955, she was the director of the Cheb Town Picture Gallery, located in the town hall building. The State Gallery acquired its basic collection through transfers from the Cheb Museum and from damaged buildings in the border region. Initially, the museum owned a small collection of 17th- and 18th-century European paintings, examples of 17th-century Cheb relief intarsia, and, above all, a collection of outstanding Gothic sculptures of local provenance. Initially, the gallery focused on exhibitions of works on loan from other institutions ("Czech Painting of the 19th Century"), but from the mid-1960s onwards, it built up its own collection of Czech modern art.

The first director of the gallery was painter Bojmír Hutta (1920–1987), and his colleague until 1969 was Mira Mladějovská. Since 1965, the Cheb Gallery has also been responsible for the restoration of sculptures collected from the region and placed at Starý Hrozňatov Castle. The sculpture park in the castle was to be expanded with contemporary works from the proposed Sculpture and Landscape Biennial. After Warsaw Pact invasion of Czechoslovakia in August 1968 the sculpture symposium could no longer take place, and in 1972 the castle was taken over by the Ministry of the Interior.

At the beginning of normalization, Bojmír Hutta was dismissed and, moreover, "classified as an unreliable person, lost his passport, and was monitored by the State Security until the end of his life." The newly appointed director, František Peťas (1912–1976), continued B. Hutta's concept and did not prevent the purchase of works by artists who had been subjected to various forms of harassment during normalization. After his death, the gallery's former expert employee, cultural scientist Ludmila Vomelová, took over as director in 1976. She contributed to the expansion of the collections and also developed concert activities and other accompanying events, thanks to which the gallery became an important cultural centre in the region. From 1976 to 1987, art historian Božena Vachudová worked there as an independent expert. Anna Sochorová was employed there since 1976, from 1992 to 2008 as chief curator.

From 1968 to 1970 and again from 1987, art historian Jiří Vykoukal worked at the gallery, becoming its director in 1990. From 1991 to 2001, he was chairman of the Council of Galleries of the Czech Republic. During his tenure, the Cheb gallery became one of the leading art museums in the Czech Republic, establishing a clear profile for its exhibition, collection, and publishing activities and organizing a number of major projects that were well received throughout the Czech Republic. In 1968, he organized the first and last edition of the "Triennial of South Bohemian, North Bohemian, and West Bohemian Artists in Cheb," which took place from October 1968 to January 1969. In 2001, the Cheb gallery was transferred to the administration of the Karlovy Vary Region. In 2010, Jiří Vykoukal resigned for personal reasons and Marcel Fišer was appointed director on the basis of a competitive selection process. Jiří Gordon works at the gallery as the head of the professional department and curator.

In the past, the Cheb region was predominantly populated by ethnic Germans. Therefore, in 2004, the Cheb Gallery of Fine Arts began organizing a symposium entitled "Gaps in History – Lücken in der Geschichte," which refers to the exhibition "Gaps in History, 1890–1938: The Polemical Spirit of Central Europe – Germans, Jews, Czechs" (Prague City Gallery, 1994, curator Hana Rousová). The curator of the symposium, in which GAVU participated together with the Mid-Europe Festival until 2009, was Jana Orlíková-Brabcová. In 2012, the symposium was revived and is held in cooperation with the Regional Gallery in Liberec alternately in Cheb and Liberec. It includes exhibition and publication projects prepared in cooperation with the Arbor vitae publishing house. From the beginning, the symposium has been dedicated to the work of German-speaking artists who were active in Bohemia, Moravia and Silesia until the end of World War II. The contributions of the first five years are summarized in the anthology of the same name (2010).

In 2009, the Gallery of Fine Arts in Cheb initiated the Graffiti Boom project. Until 2016, it organized the Graffiti Boom festival, during which street artists created their works in public spaces and on prepared panels. The festival included the creation of large-format graffiti by one of the artists and, as part of the Graffiti Jam exhibition, vernissages, music events, and workshops for children and young people. The authors of the large-format graffiti were Jan Kaláb Point (2009), Masker (2011), Tron (2012), Pasta Oner (2013), Keim and Peok, Obic and Tron, X-Dog, Oblut, Poster 177, Smek, Sabon, Saon, Laser, Raso, and others (2014), Tron (2015), Luděk Keim and Tomáš Kocka (2016). The festival was held with financial support from the Ministry of Culture of the Czech Republic and the town of Cheb.

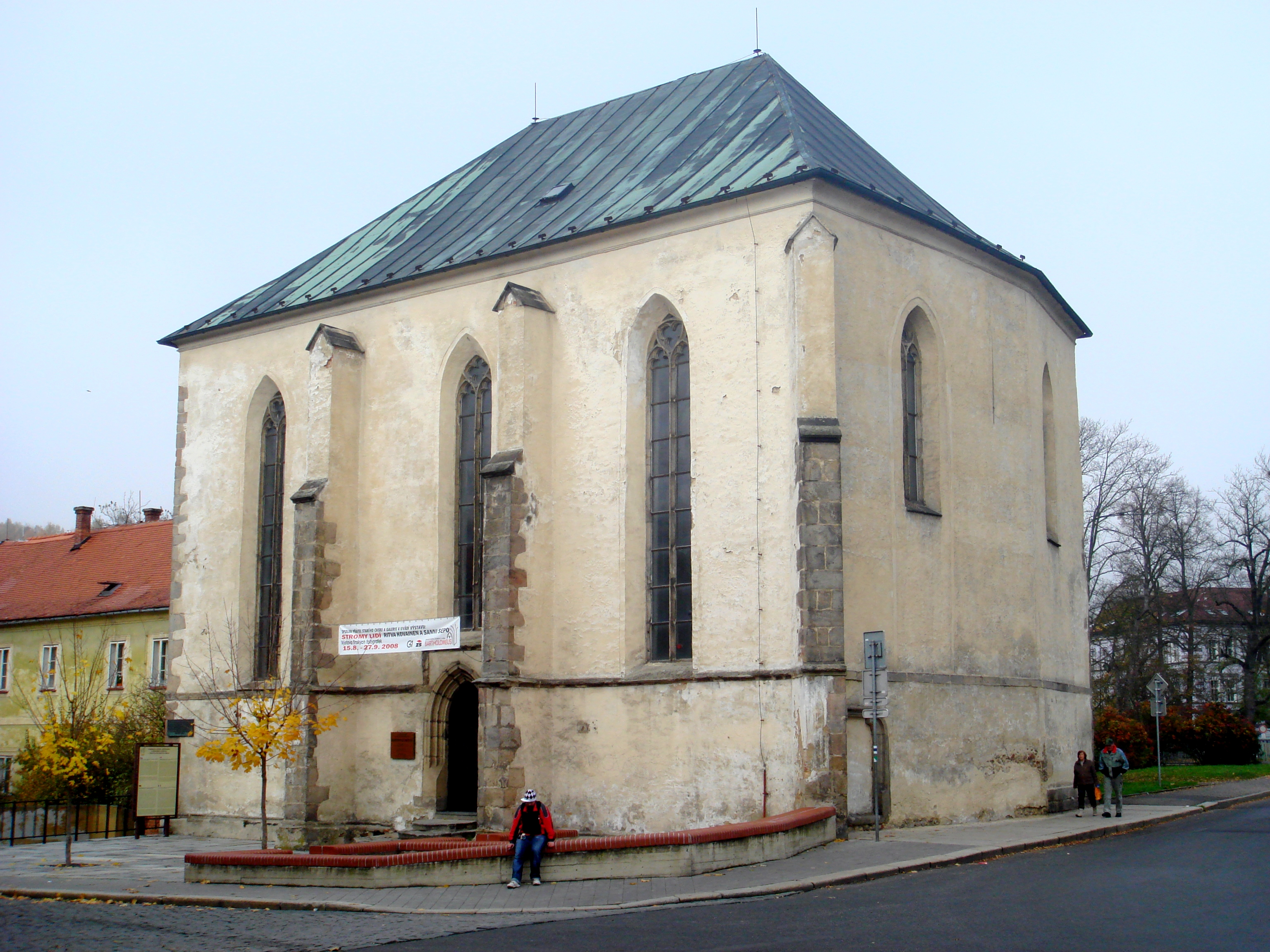
Church of St. Bartholomew

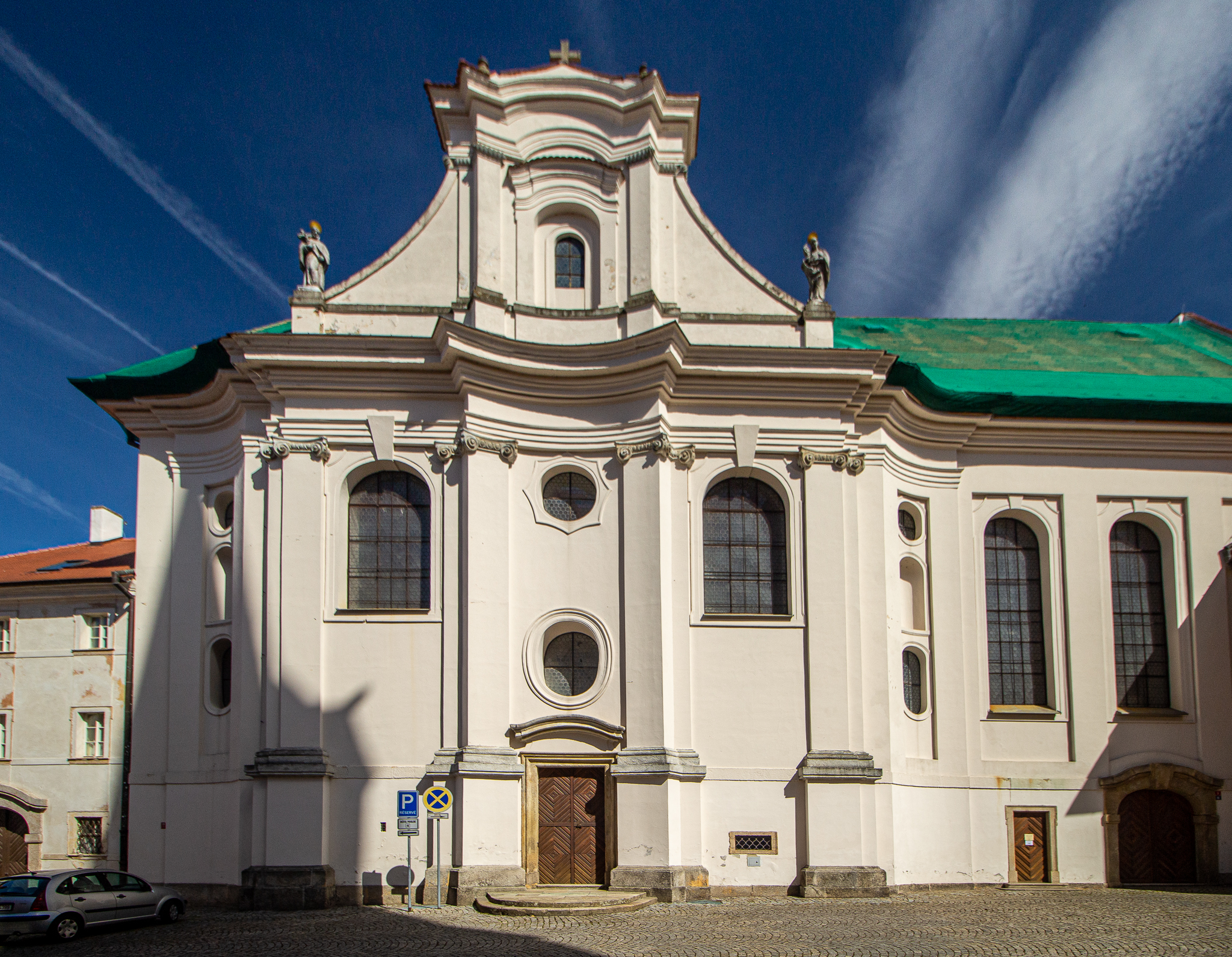
Church of St. Clare

In 2013, the collections underwent a major reinstallation. The Cheb Gothic art was transferred from the Church of St. Clare to the new permanent exhibition on the second floor of the town hall, and Church of St. Clare was returned to the town as a concert and wedding hall. By 2016, other exhibition spaces in the main building had been gradually renovated to meet international standards for contemporary art museums. The Ministry of Culture recognized GAVU's exhibition program as the best of all the regional galleries it administers and provided subsidies for exhibitions and new acquisitions for the collections.

Since 1962, the Club of Friends of Fine Arts has been active in Cheb, organizing concerts, discussions with artists, screenings of films about art, and lectures on literature. The main organizer was Zlata Huttová (1935–2001), who married Bojmír Hutta in the early 1960s and later began working as a gallery specialist. After the reconstruction of Church of St. Bartholomew, the club organized regular concerts there. From 1966 to 1969, it hosted the Chamber Music Festival, followed in subsequent years by the Music and Art series, which continues to the present day. At the turn of the 1960s and 1970s, the club also used the Starý Hrozňatov castle and, from 1975, the Church of St. Clare.

== Main building ==
The palace, built according to a design by Prague architect Antonín Haffenecker, is a Baroque architecture dating from 1723 to 1727. The town hall was originally designed as a monumental two-story building with a facade divided by a high order of pilasters, with a central section and two side wings with portals and towers. Due to a lack of funds, only the south wing with a courtyard section (1727) and later the clock tower (1849) were built. Inside the building, there is a central grand staircase leading to both floors of the building. The ceiling of the staircase with a mirror vault is decorated with stucco work featuring the coats of arms of Cheb mayors, allegorical figures of virtues, the coats of arms of Bohemia, Austria and Hungary, and the Habsburg family coat of arms. The staircase is lined with a stone balustrade, with a statue of St. Joseph by the Cheb sculptor Johann Carl Stilp (1668–1735) and a statue of Hercules by the sculptor Petr Anton Felsner (active 1710–1745) on the second floor.

== Expositions ==
On the second floor, in the right wing, there is a permanent exhibition of Cheb Gothic sculpture. There is also the so-called Great Gallery (focused on large exhibition projects) and the "Opus magnum" exhibition format, which presents individual extraordinary works of Czech and foreign art.

A permanent exhibition of modern and contemporary art, which presents the development of Czech art from the beginning of the 20th century to the present day, occupies the entire first floor of the Town Hall Palace. The expansion and profiling of the modern art collection is credited to art historian Jiří Vykoukal, who in addition to modern art, focused primarily on the artists active during World War II and on younger generations. Thematically oriented temporary exhibitions, located in the side hall of the permanent exhibition of Czech modern art, present a selection of works stored in the gallery's depositories. In 2012, the exhibition of modern and contemporary art on the first floor of the town hall was reinstalled, equipped with new paneling and gallery lighting, and expanded by two rooms and a panel in the hallway.

On the ground floor, there is the Small Gallery focused on the works of the youngest and middle generations of artists, as well as a museum café with space for exhibitions of modern Czech illustration and a lecture hall. In the basement, there is a multipurpose hall reserved for working with children and standard educational work. There is also a children's corner/gallery "under the baobab tree" on the second floor, reserved for children.

=== Exhibition (selection) ===
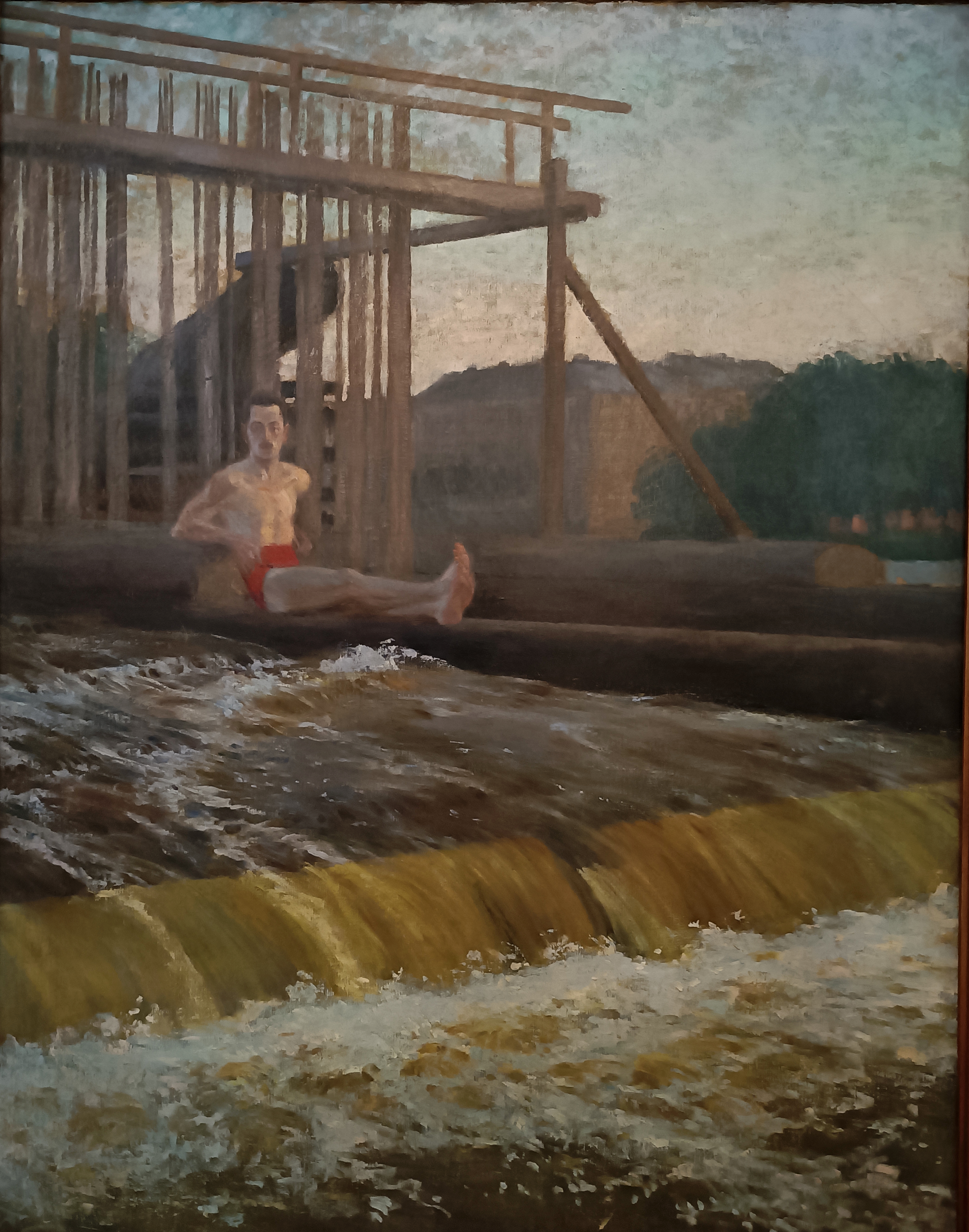
Miloš Jiránek, On the weir (1904)

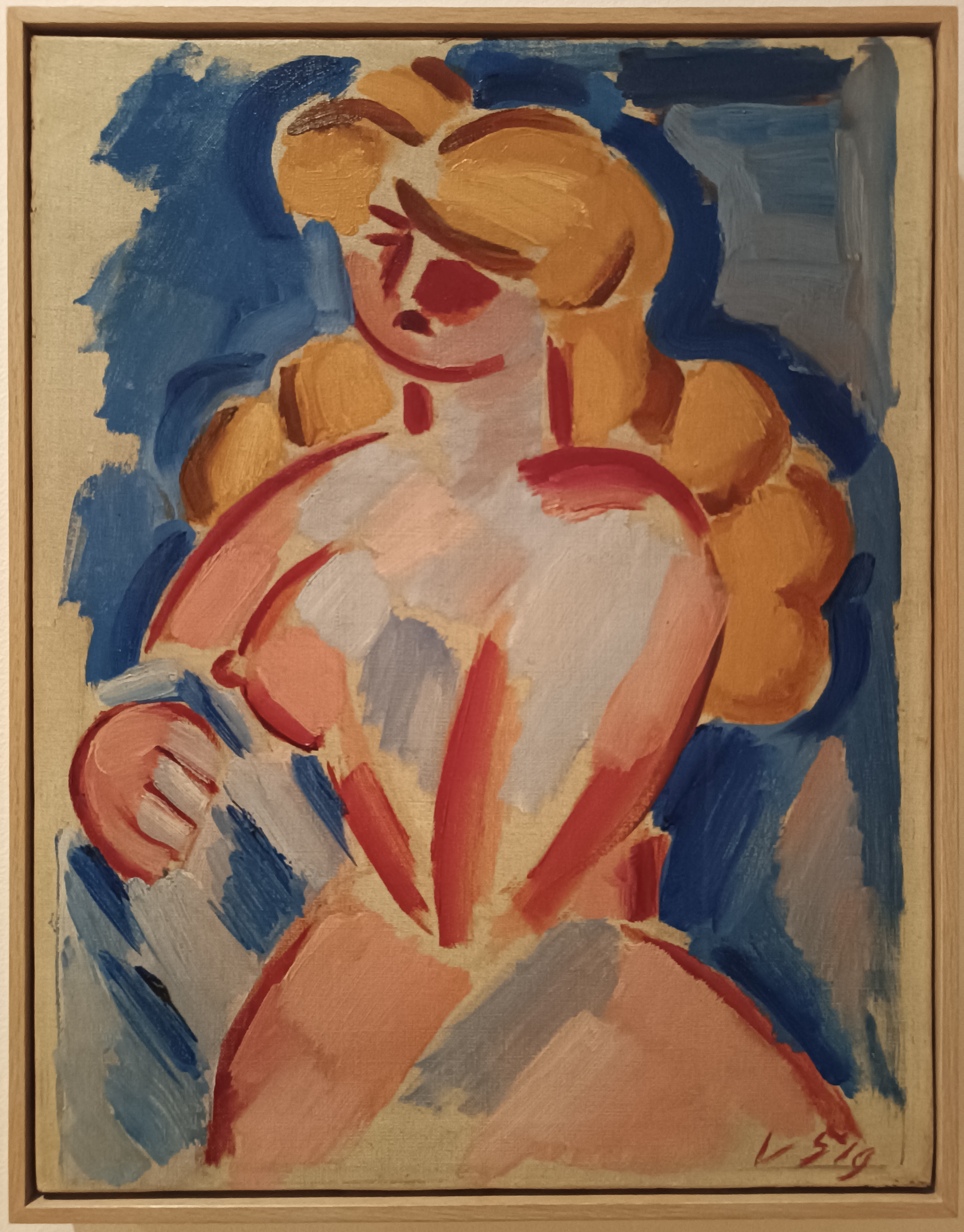
Václav Špála, Blonde Girl (1919)

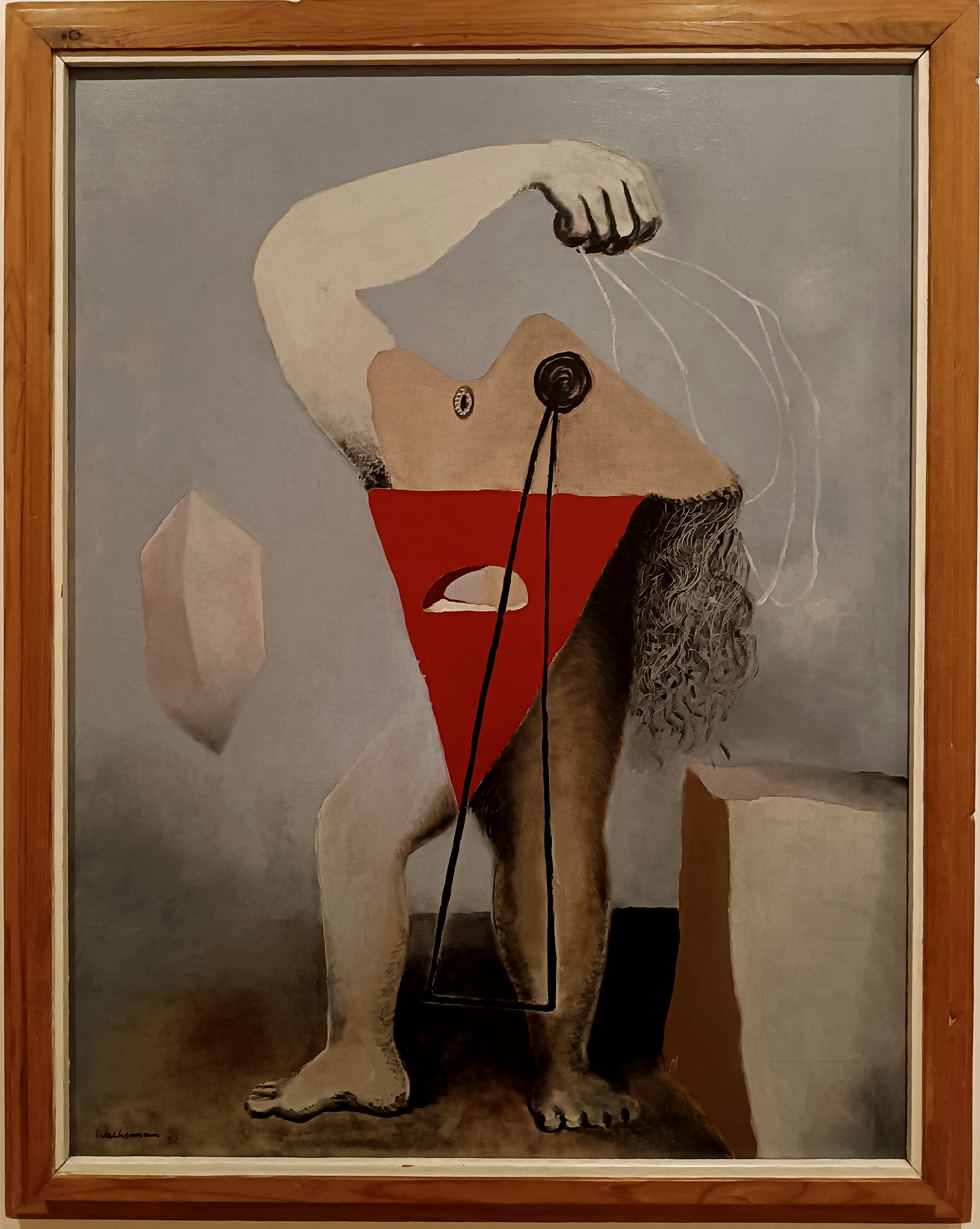
Alois Wachsman, Man (1932)

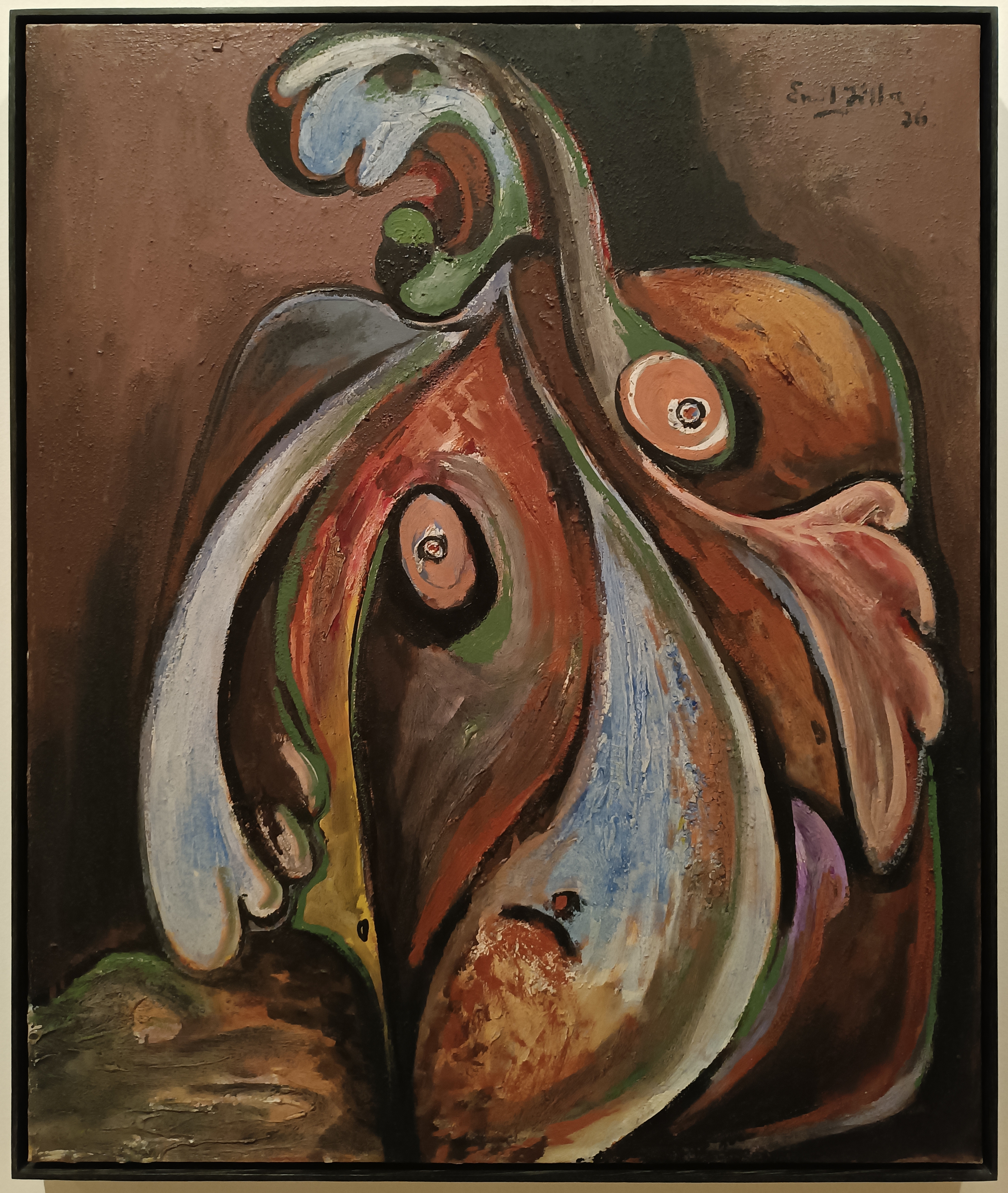
Emil Filla, Woman in a Chair (1936)

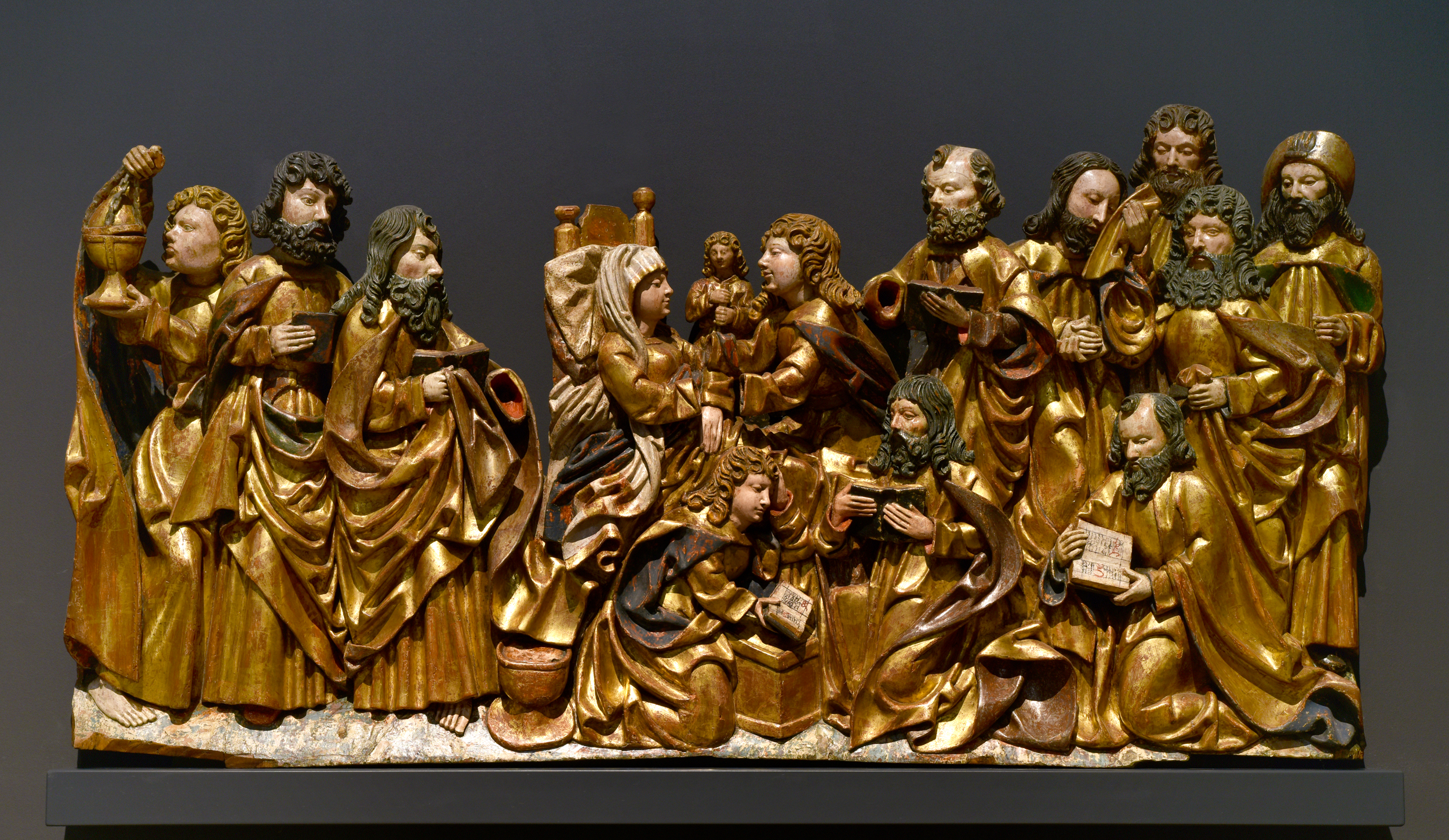
Death of the Virgin Mary of Hazlov (1500–1520)

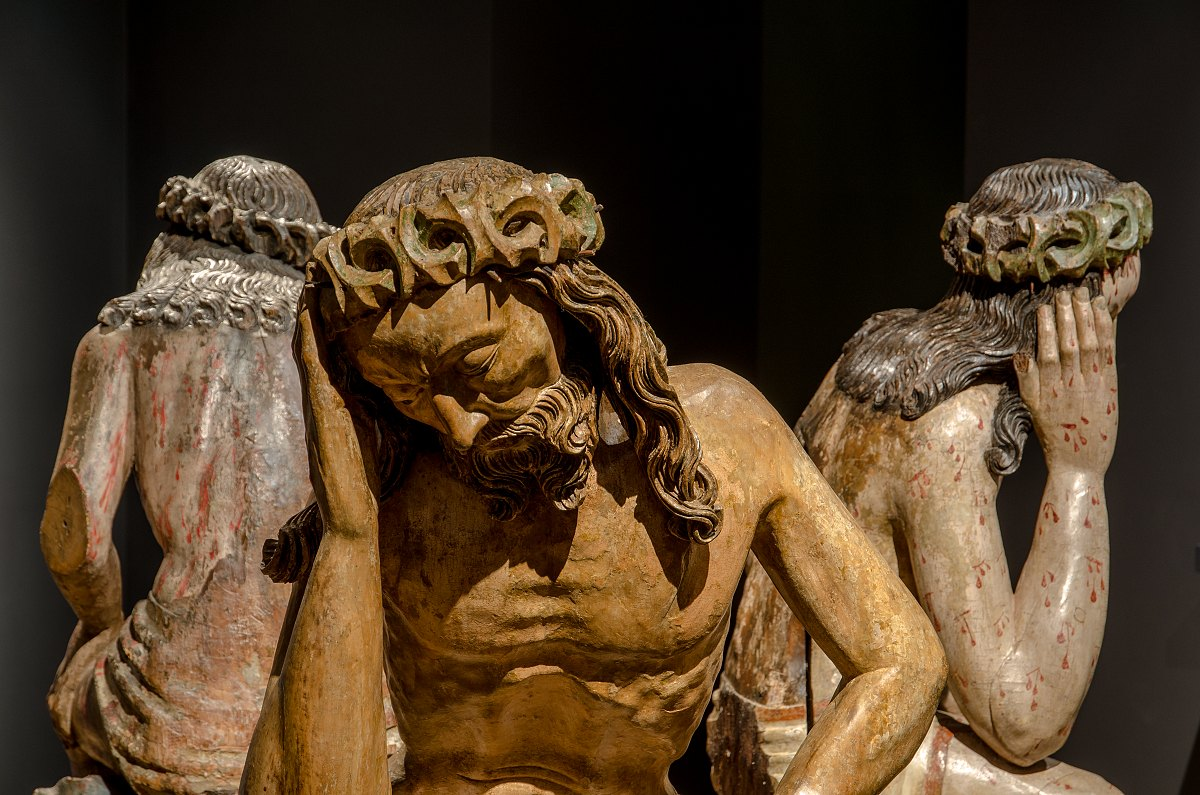
Sculptures of Resting Christs (16th century)

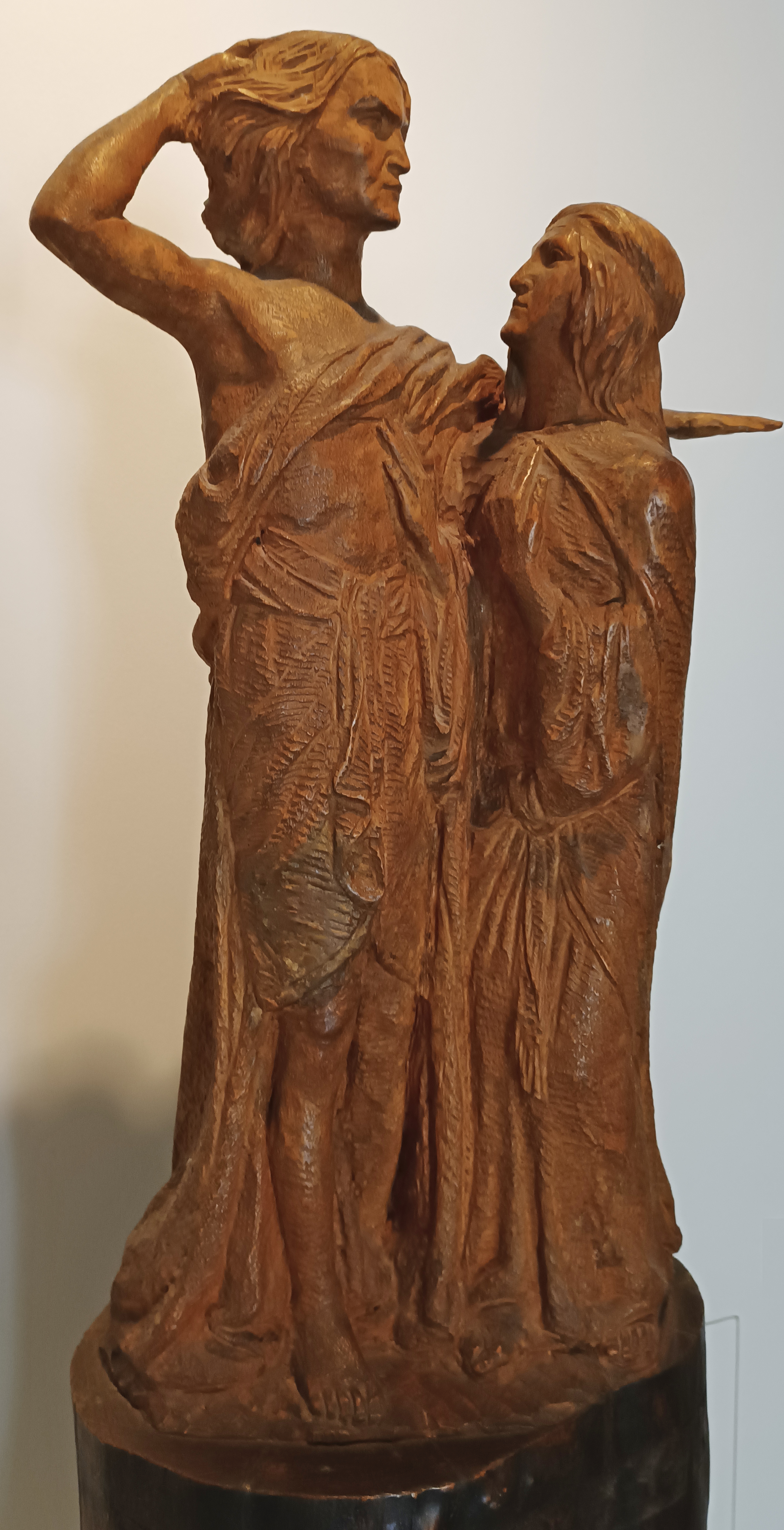
František Bílek, Spiritual Meeting (1925)

Otto Gutfreund, Head of Father (1912)

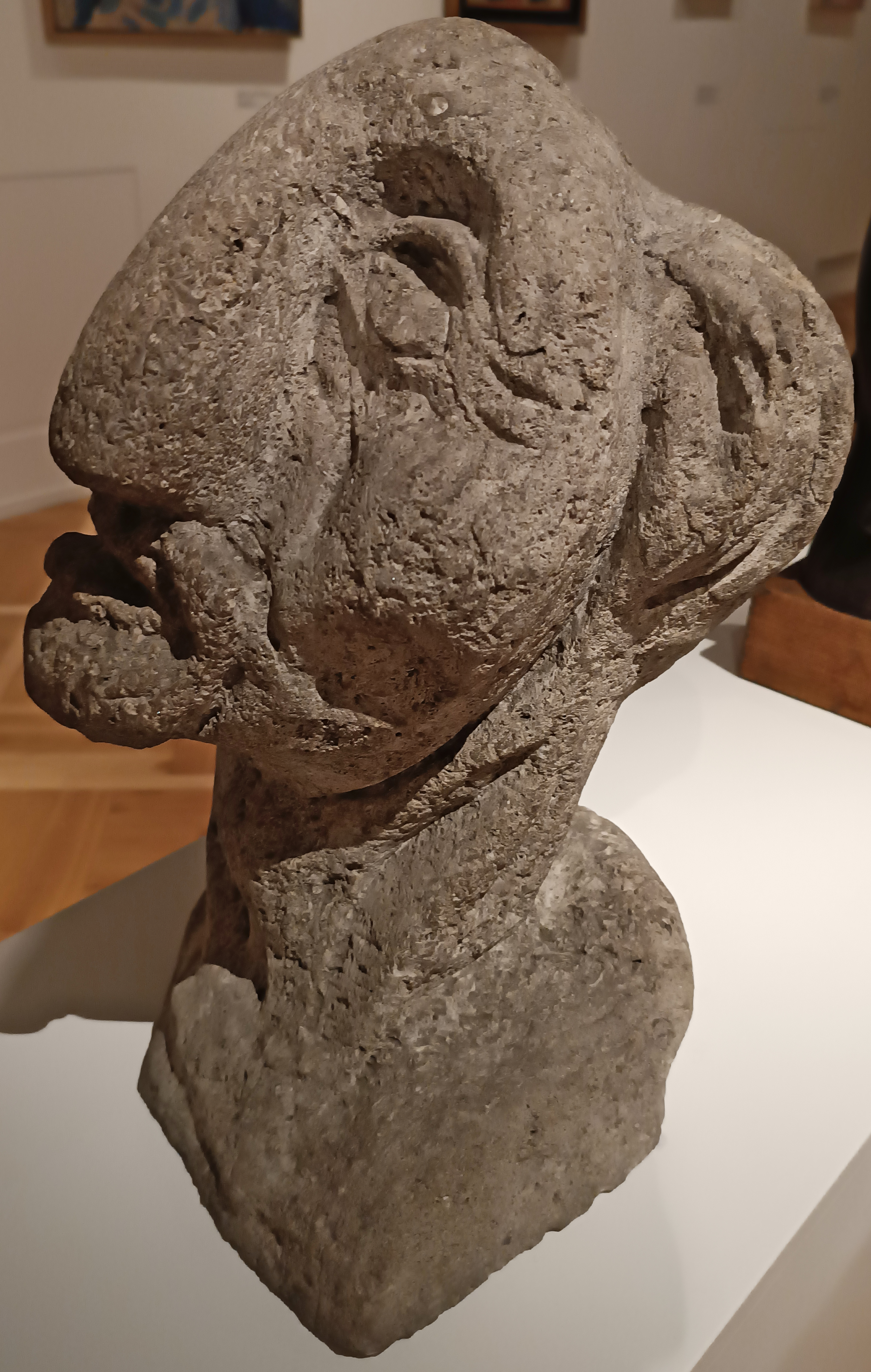
Emil Filla, Head (1935)

=== Historical exhibitions of Gothic art ===
The founding of the Gothic sculpture gallery is closely linked to the post-war history of Cheb, whose centre suffered damage during World War II and fell into disrepair after the post-war displacement of the German population until 1950, when it was declared a historic preservation area. Between 1950 and 1967, the historic centre of the town underwent a complete reconstruction, and a new use was sought for a number of architectural monuments, including the hospital Church of St. Bartholomew, whose generous reconstruction was designed by Otto Rothmayer. At the suggestion of the then director of the Cheb Gallery, Bojmír Hutta, an exhibition of Gothic sculpture was established here in 1967. Most of the exhibits came from destroyed and demolished buildings throughout the region, from property transfers, and some were later acquired through purchases. The restoration of the sculptures took place in several stages from the 1960s to the first half of the 1970s and was paid for by the Cheb Gallery. In 1999, the Church of St. Bartholomew was returned in restitution to the Knights of the Cross with the Red Star and the entire exhibition was moved in 2004 to the former church of the Cheb Poor Clares, which the gallery had previously used as an exhibition and concert hall.

Church of St. Clare built in 1708–1711 according to a design by Christoph Dientzenhofer was deconsecrated in 1782 when Emperor Joseph II abolished the monastery. In the following years, the monastery served as a brewery warehouse, military school, and prison until 1905, when it was purchased by the town of Cheb. The town placed its archives there and demolished part of the buildings. After World War I, the devastated church was saved by the Association for the Construction of a Memorial Hall. In 1923, the town of Cheb bought the entire monastery complex and, after reconstruction in 1937, established a memorial hall in the church for those who died in World War I. After World War II, the church served as a warehouse for confiscated German property, and between 1965 and 1969 it underwent another costly restoration. A mastery organ instrument by Rieger–Kloss in Krnov was installed in place of the original altar, and in 1973 it was opened as an exhibition and concert hall. Between 2000 and 2001, it was rebuilt again for the needs of the Cheb Gallery, and in 2004, an exhibition of Cheb Gothic art was installed there, along with a smaller exhibition of a collection of 17th- and 18th-century European paintings. The church had to be heated all year round at great expense, so since 2013, the exhibition of Cheb Gothic sculpture has been permanently located on the second floor of the Town Hall Palace.

=== Retromuseum ===
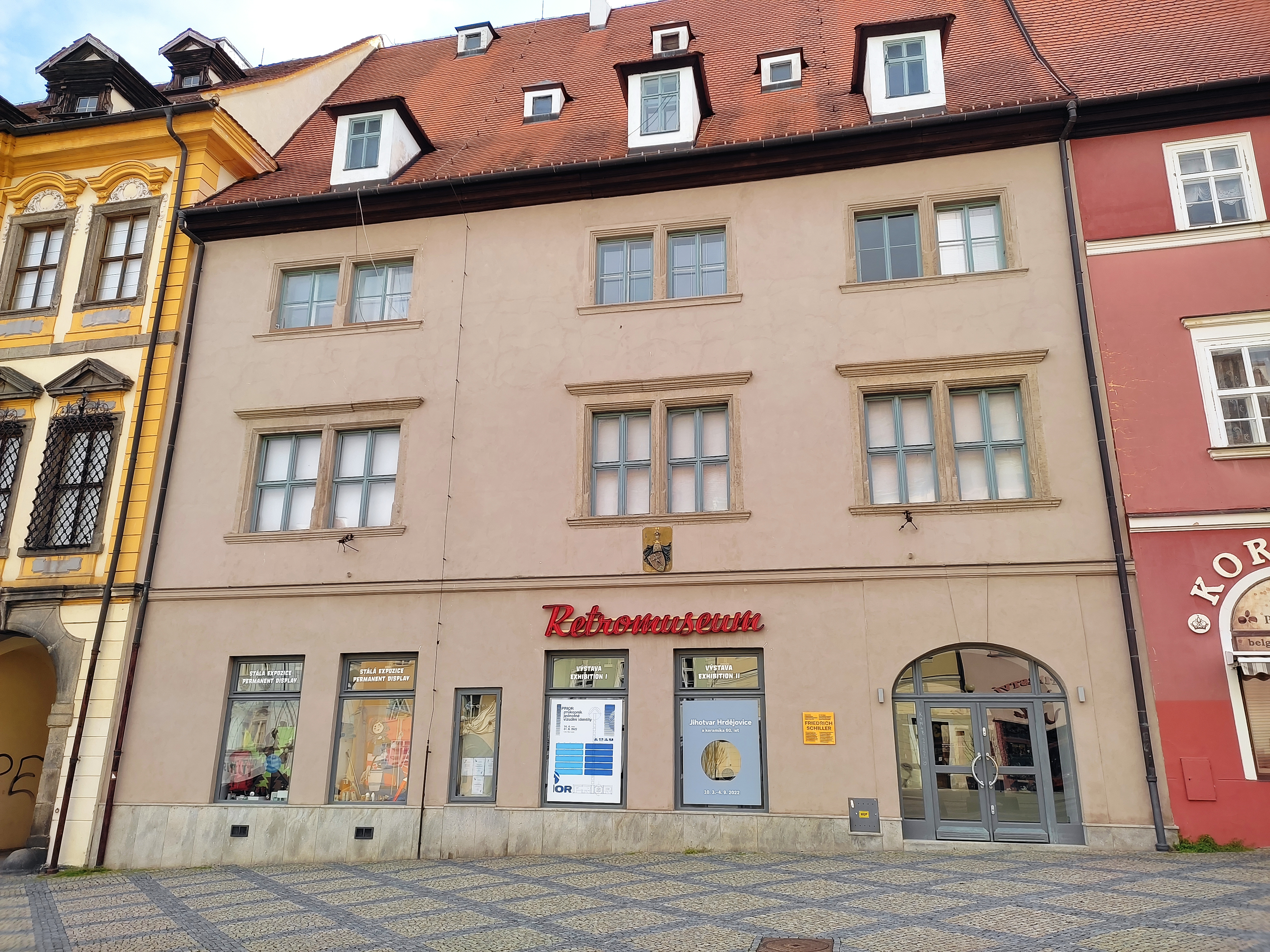
Retromuseum

Retromuseum is a branch of the gallery focused on post-war design with overlaps into other disciplines (architecture, music) and lifestyle. It was established in less than two years between March 2014 and February 2016 thanks to the support of the town of Cheb, which provided the building known as Schiller House free of charge. The renovation of the house was financed by the European Union – ROP Northwest and the Karlovy Vary Region. In addition to the main exposition hall, there is also an exhibition space at the second floor for temporary exhibitions. The main curator of the Retromuseum is art historian Daniela Kramerová, author of a monumental exhibition dedicated to the Brussels style and commemorating the highly acclaimed Czech participation in Expo 58 in Brussels.

== Collections ==
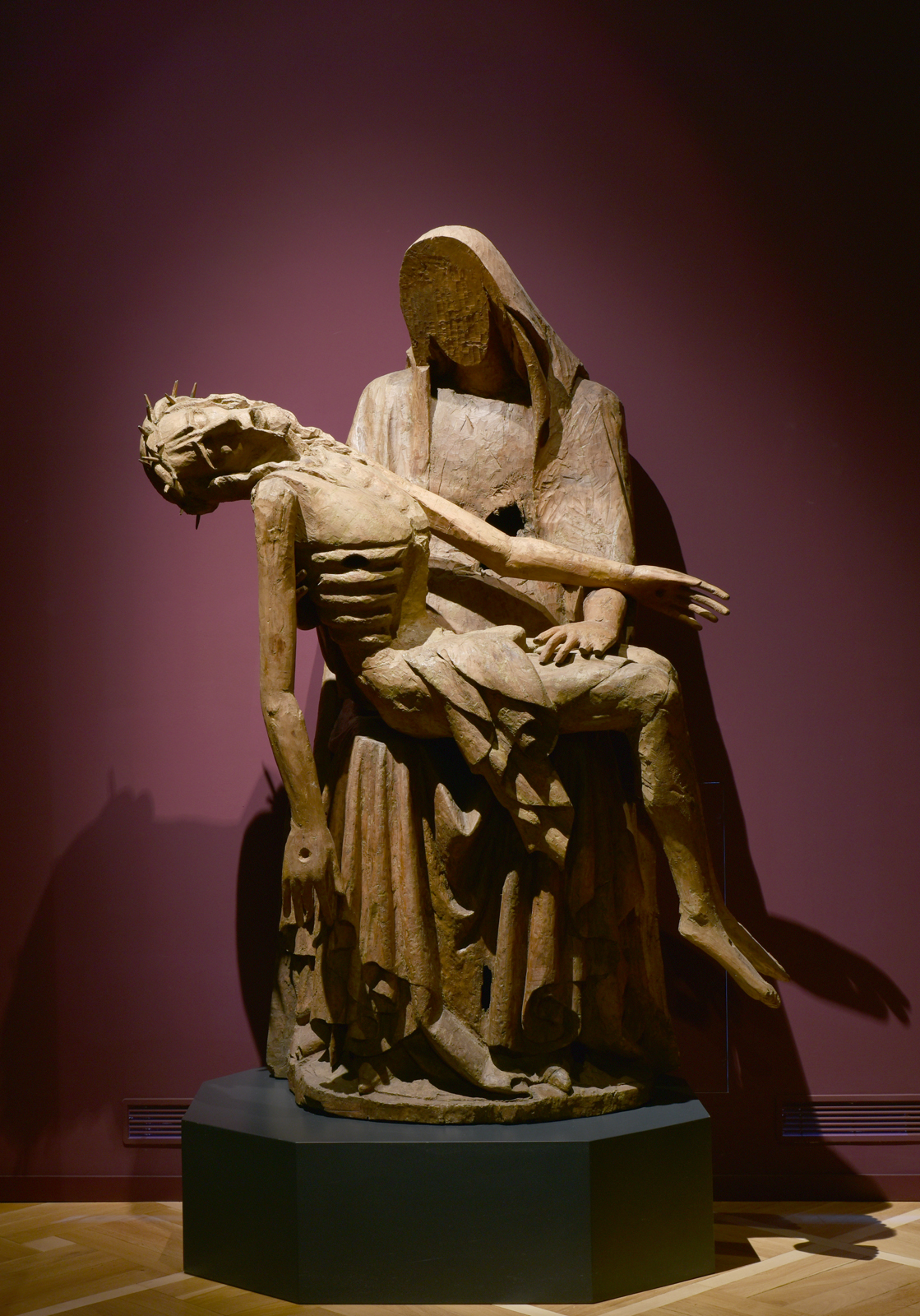
Pietà from the Dominican Monastery in Cheb (1350)

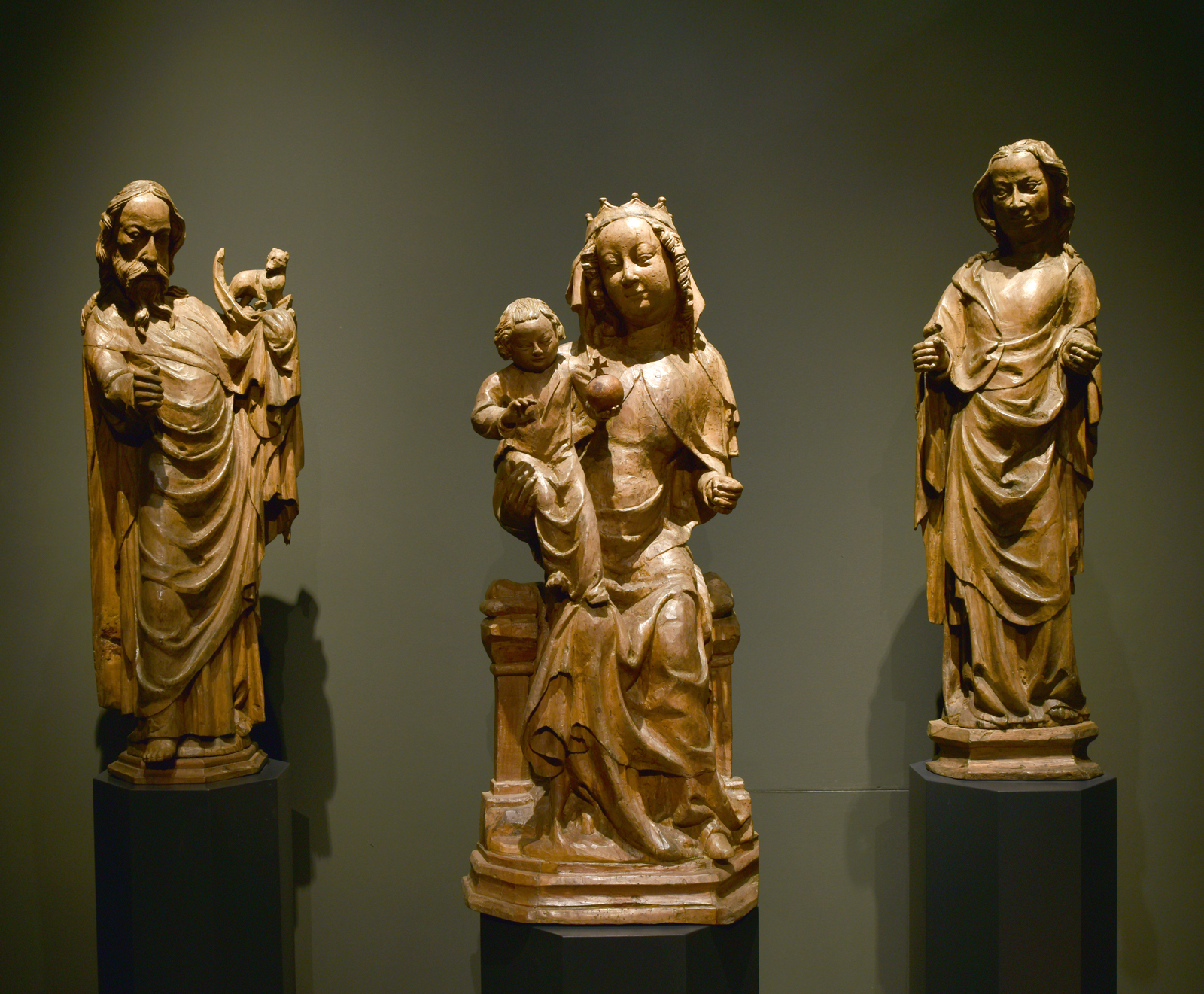
Madonna with St John the Baptist and St John the Evangelist (1360s)

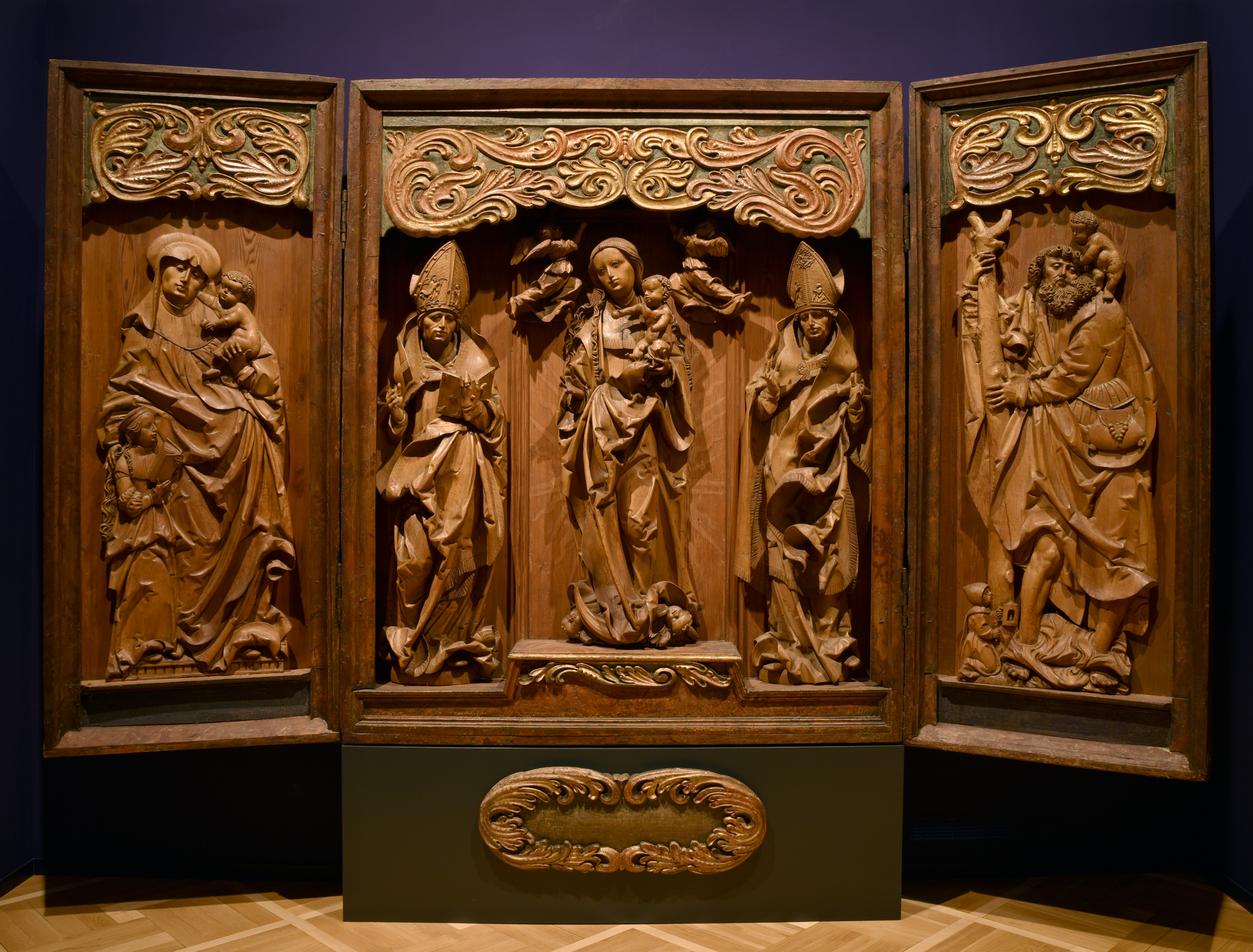
Winged Altarpiece of Our Lady from Seeberg (c. 1520)

In addition to a small collection of old artworks transferred from the Cheb Museum, the GAVU collection was built up through its own acquisitions. By 1970, the Cheb gallery owned 583 artworks, including 282 paintings and 71 sculptures. Its director, Bojmír Hutta, mainly purchased traditional Czech landscape paintings. During the time when art historian Jiří Vykoukal was director of the gallery, the collections were expanded to include contemporary works, such as those from the Triennial of Regional Artists from Southern, Western, and Northern Bohemia. The purchase of important works continued under director Peťas, and by 1976 the gallery had acquired significant works by Karel Černý, Karel Holan, Miloslav Holý, Alfréd Justitz, Otakar Nejedlý, Vlastimil Rada, Václav Rabas, Václav Špála, František Tichý and other artists.

During normalization between 1970 and 1989, the collections grew by 2,481 art objects, mainly prints, drawings, and applied art, partly also works by pro-regime artists from compulsory purchases from so-called ministerial funds. The additions included 400 paintings and 180 sculptures, among others by classics of Czech modern art (Jan Bauch, Jaroslav Panuška, Jan Preisler, Jakub Schikaneder, Josef Šíma). At that time, the gallery acquired works by members of the Umělecká beseda art association, such as a collection of 30 paintings by Václav Rabas and paintings by Jan Slavíček, Antonín Hudeček, Oldřich Blažíček, Jan Trampota, František Jiroudek, landscape painters from the Mařák school (Alois Kalvoda, František Kaván, Jaroslav Panuška, Josef Ullmann), or representatives of the war generation Jan Smetana and Karel Souček and interwar artists Pravoslav Kotík, Antonín Pelc and Vlasta Vostřebalová-Fischerová. Regional landscape painting is represented, for example, by the Cheb painter Jan Spáčil.

Acquisitions of post-war art come mainly from the gallery's rich exhibition activities, which also featured artists who were banned from exhibiting regularly during normalization (Jaroslava Pešicová and František Štorek, Marie Blabolilová, Vladimír Preclík, Jiří John, Petr Pavlík, sisters Jitka and Květa Válovy, Jiří Anderle, Karel Malich, Josef Istler, František Ronovský, Daisy Mrázková and Jiří Mrázek, and from group exhibitions (Eight Young Graphic Artists – e.g. Jiří Načeradský, Oldřich Kulhánek, Petra Oriešková).

With the appointment of Jiří Vykoukal as curator (1987) and later as director (1991), there was a fundamental change in acquisition policy. In addition to supplementing the core collection of 20th-century Czech paintings and drawings with works by artists not yet represented in the gallery's holdings, or whose representation was insufficient, he also succeeded in expanding the collection with important works of old art. For the collection of Gothic sculpture, in addition to the Swabian Madonna from the third quarter of the 15th century, he also acquired a unique Pietà from the Dominican Monastery in Cheb from around 1350, which is considered a work of European significance. He added works by Johann Adalbert Angermayer, Petr Brandl, Johann Michael Bretschneider, Pieter de Putter, and Cornelis de Wael to the collection of 17th- and 18th-century paintings.

The collection of representatives of Czech modernism was supplemented or expanded with works by Emil Filla, Otto Gutfreund, František Foltýn, František Hudeček, František Gross, Josef Istler, Kamil Lhoták, Vincenc Makovský, Bohumír Matal, Jaroslav Puchmertl, Zdeněk Sklenář, Václav Špála, Jindřich Štyrský, Václav Tikal, Toyen, Alois Wachsman and Ladislav Zívr, as well as works by artists from the 1950s and 1960s generation, such as Václav Boštík, Hugo Demartini, Čestmír Janošek, Jan Kotík, Karel Malich, Mikuláš Medek, Robert Piesen, Vladimír Preclík, Otakar Slavík, Zbyněk Sekal, Zbyšek Sion, Jan Švankmajer, and Aleš Veselý. From the younger generation of artists who entered the art scene in the 1970s were the works of Richard Konvička, Aleš Lamr, Petr Pavlík, Michael Rittstein, Ivan Bukovský and others.

During Jiří Vykoukal's tenure, the upper limit of acquisition activity was defined by the generation that came to the fore in the early 1970s. After a several-year hiatus caused by a lack of funds, purchasing activity resumed with the arrival of director Marcel Fišer, who began to supplement it with works of art by younger generations (Václav Stratil, Jiří Kovanda, Vladimír Skrepl, Petr Kvíčala, Stanislav Diviš, Antonín Střížek, Josef Bolf, Michal Pěchouček, and Filip Turek. It also succeeded in filling certain gaps in the art of the 1960s and 1970s with works that were integrated into the permanent exhibition (Jiří Načeradský, Stanislav Kolíbal, Dalibor Chatrný).

The collections of graphic works and drawings have also been significantly expanded. The oldest works in the graphic collection, which comprises almost 1,800 pieces, are a series of sixteen engravings by Johann Elias Ridinger entitled "The Deer Hunt," acquired in 1961. It includes classic names such as František Bílek, František Kobliha, Jan Konůpek, Karel Štika, Josef Šíma, Jindřich Štyrský, Max Švabinský, Emil Filla, Cyril Bouda, Miloslav Holý, Jan Rambousek, František Hudeček, František Gross, Vojtěch Sedláček, Vladimír Komárek, and younger graphic artists Oldřich Kulhánek, Jiří John, František Burant, Zdeněk Mézl, Vladimír Suchánek. The gallery owns larger collections of graphic prints by Vladimír Boudník, Lubomír Přibyl, Ladislav Čepelák, Jaroslav Hovadík, Jaroslav Kovář, Jiří Anderle, Josef Istler, Aleš Lamr and also a set of colored etchings by Jan Švankmajer from the series Natural History (1973).

The sculpture collection includes works by Josef Václav Myslbek, Jan Štursa and Otakar Španiel, as well as their students Jindřich Wielgus, Břetislav Benda, Vincenc Makovský, and Karel Kotrba. Also represented are František Bílek, Otto Gutfreund, Emil Filla and, from the post-war realist sculptural movement, works by Karel Lidický (portraits of Božena Němcová, Jan Hus, Václav Talich, Antonín Pelc) and Karel Hladík and sculptures by Ladislav Zívr. The period from the 1960s to the 1980s is represented by official artists Alois Sopr, Rudolf Svoboda, Vincenc Vingler, ceramist Jan Kutálek and regional sculptors Vítězslav Eibl, Vlastimil Květenský and Karel Kuneš. At that time, the gallery also acquired works by Hana Purkrábková, Peter Oriešek and Karel Malich. A large part of the collection consists of medal art.

The Gothic collection includes polychrome wood carvings from the former historical region of Cheb and neighbouring areas from the early Gothic period (Master from the circle of the so-called Přemyslid Crucifix from Jihlava: Pietá, before 1350), Altarpiece from Seeberg (by sculptor from the circle of Hans Leinberger), to exhibits from the High Late Gothic period (Master of the Altar from the Church of St. Jošt: Saint Christopher, around 1530).

=== Views into the exhibition of medieval art ===
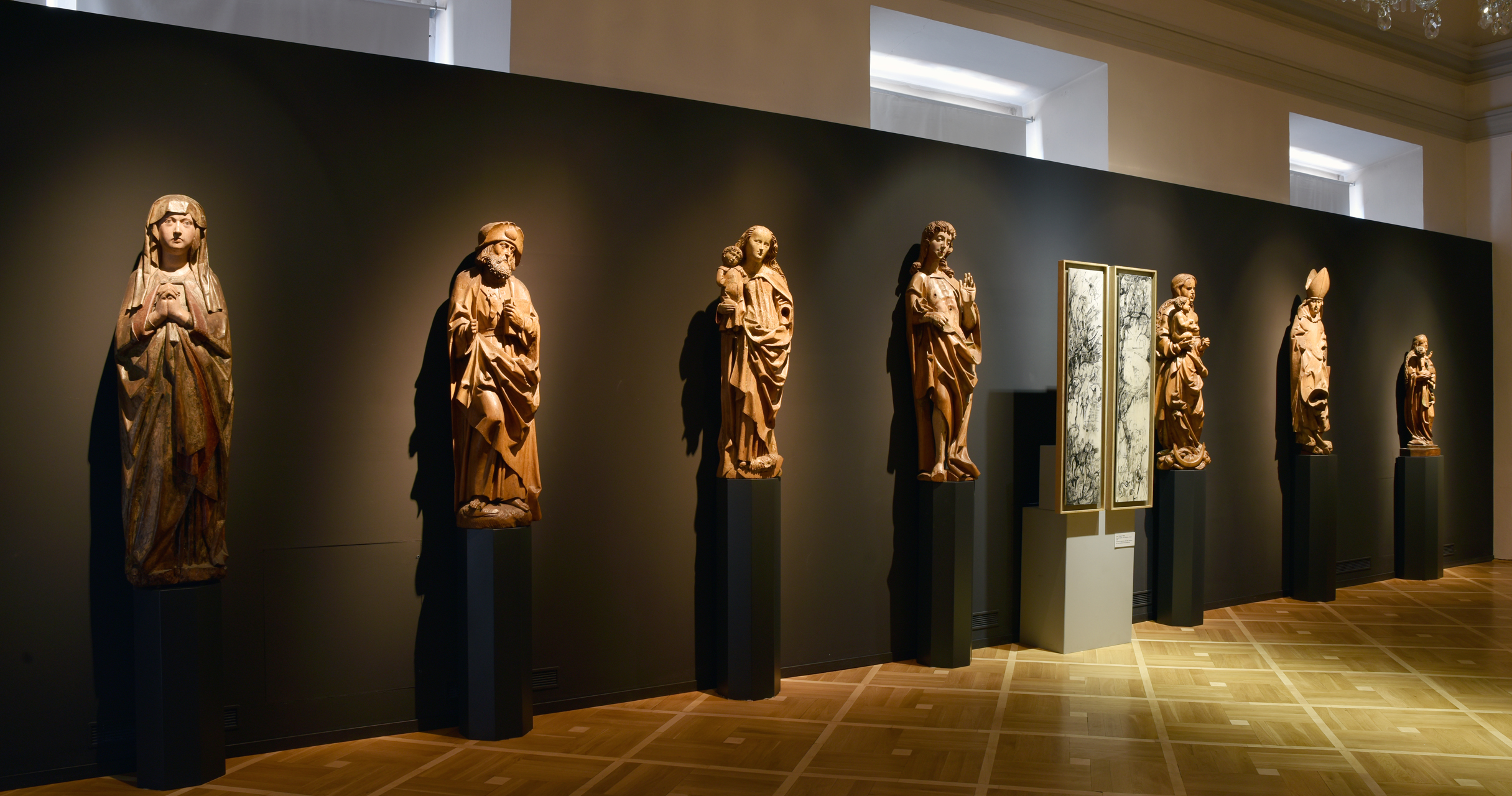

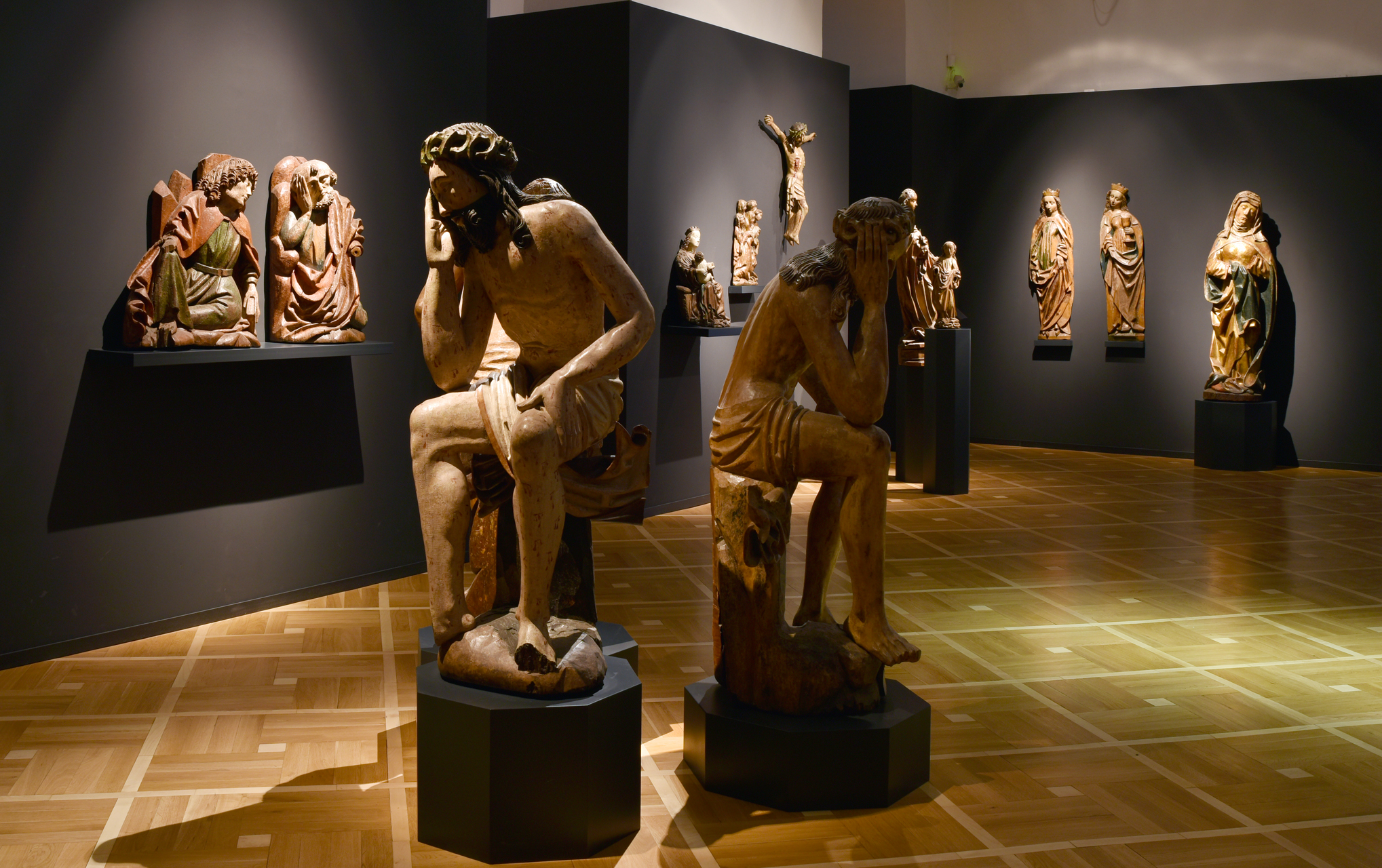

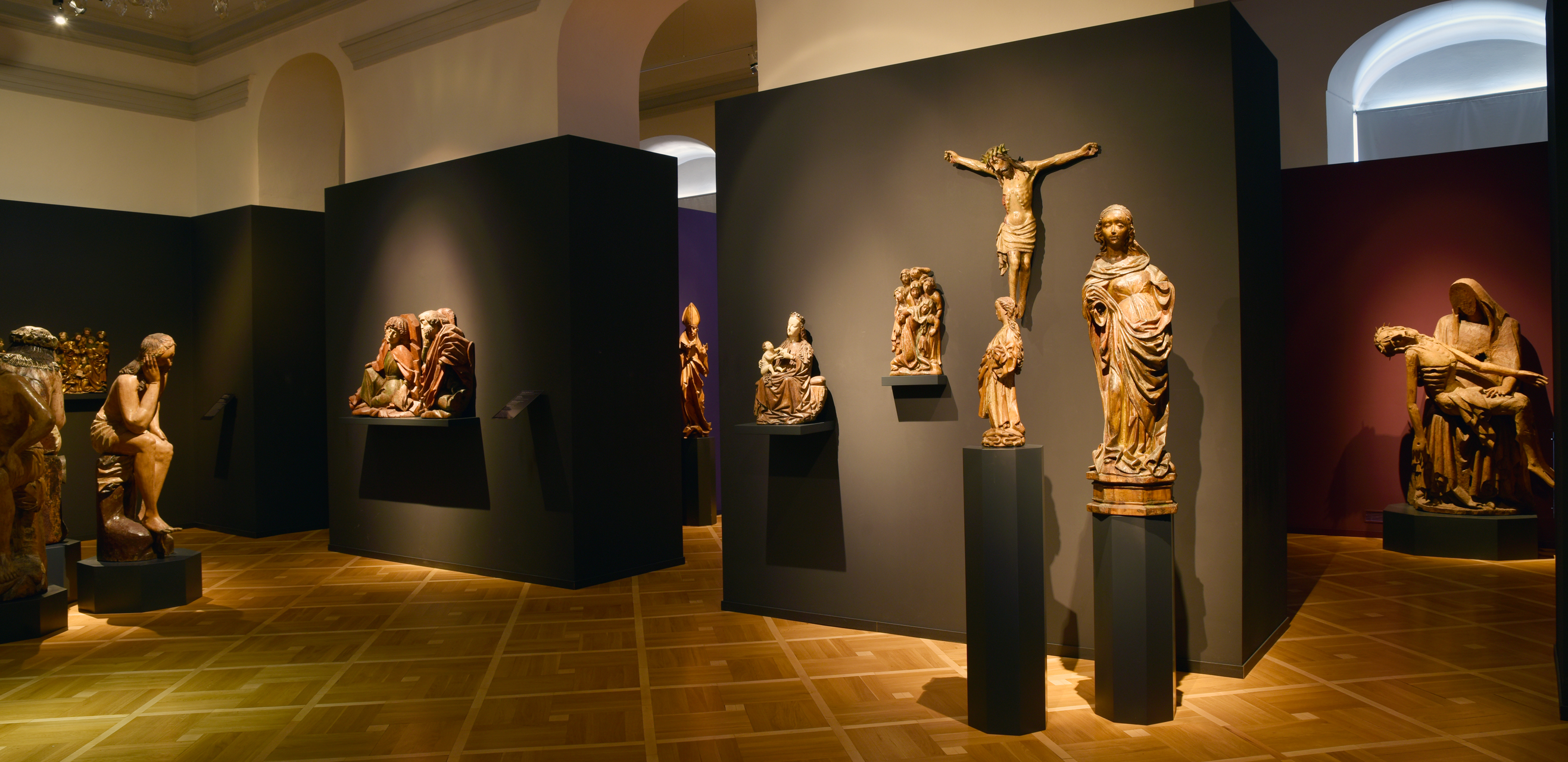

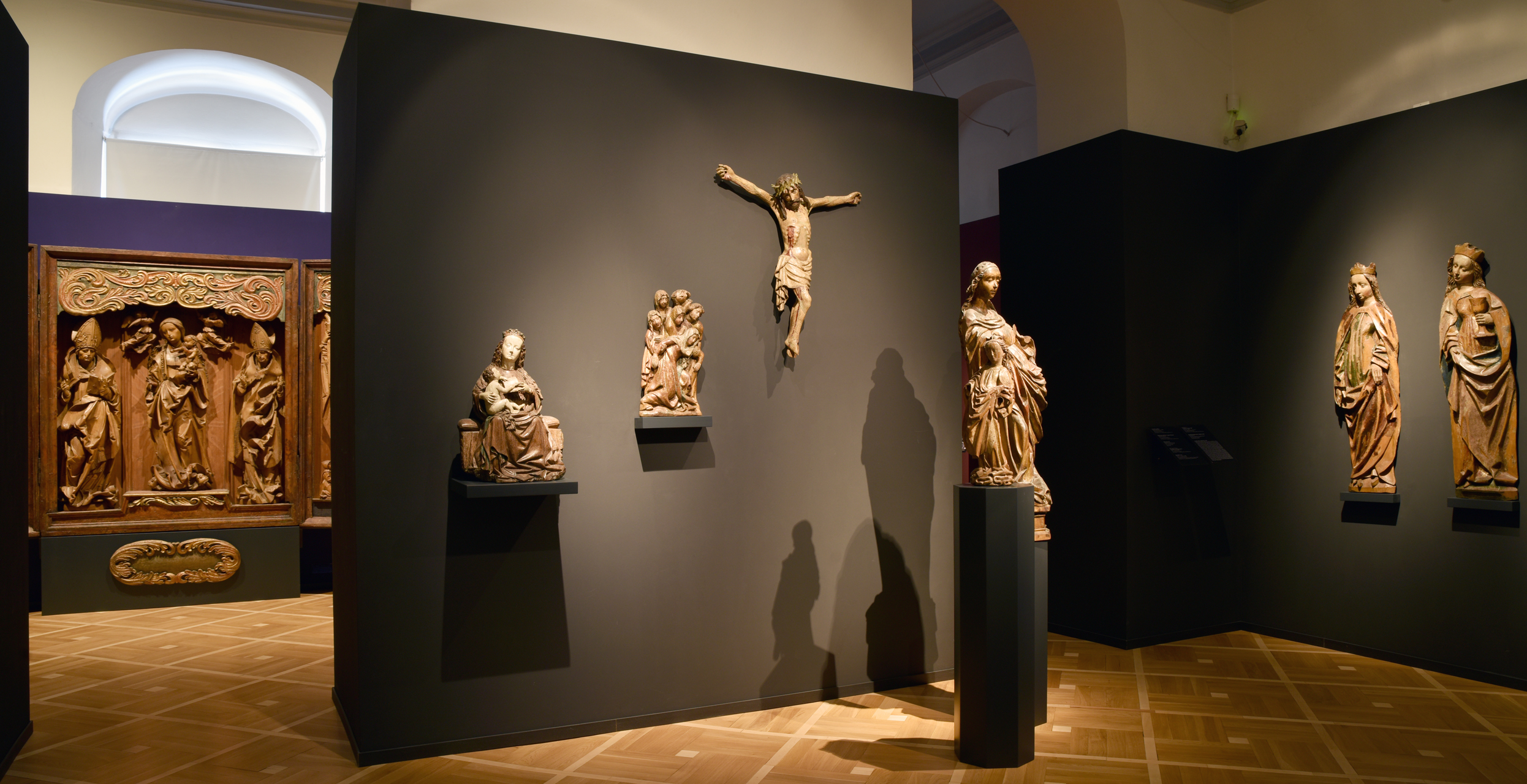

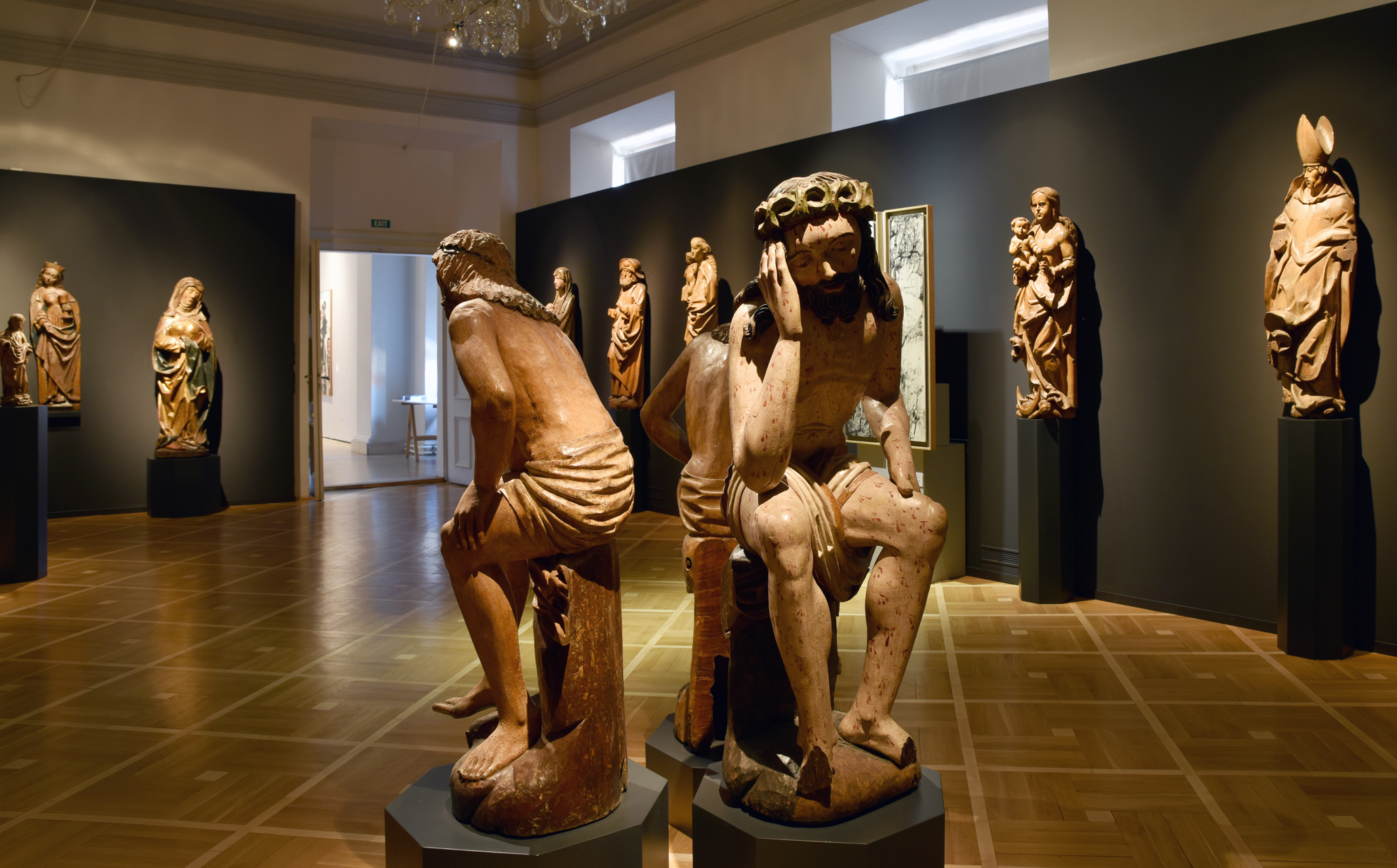

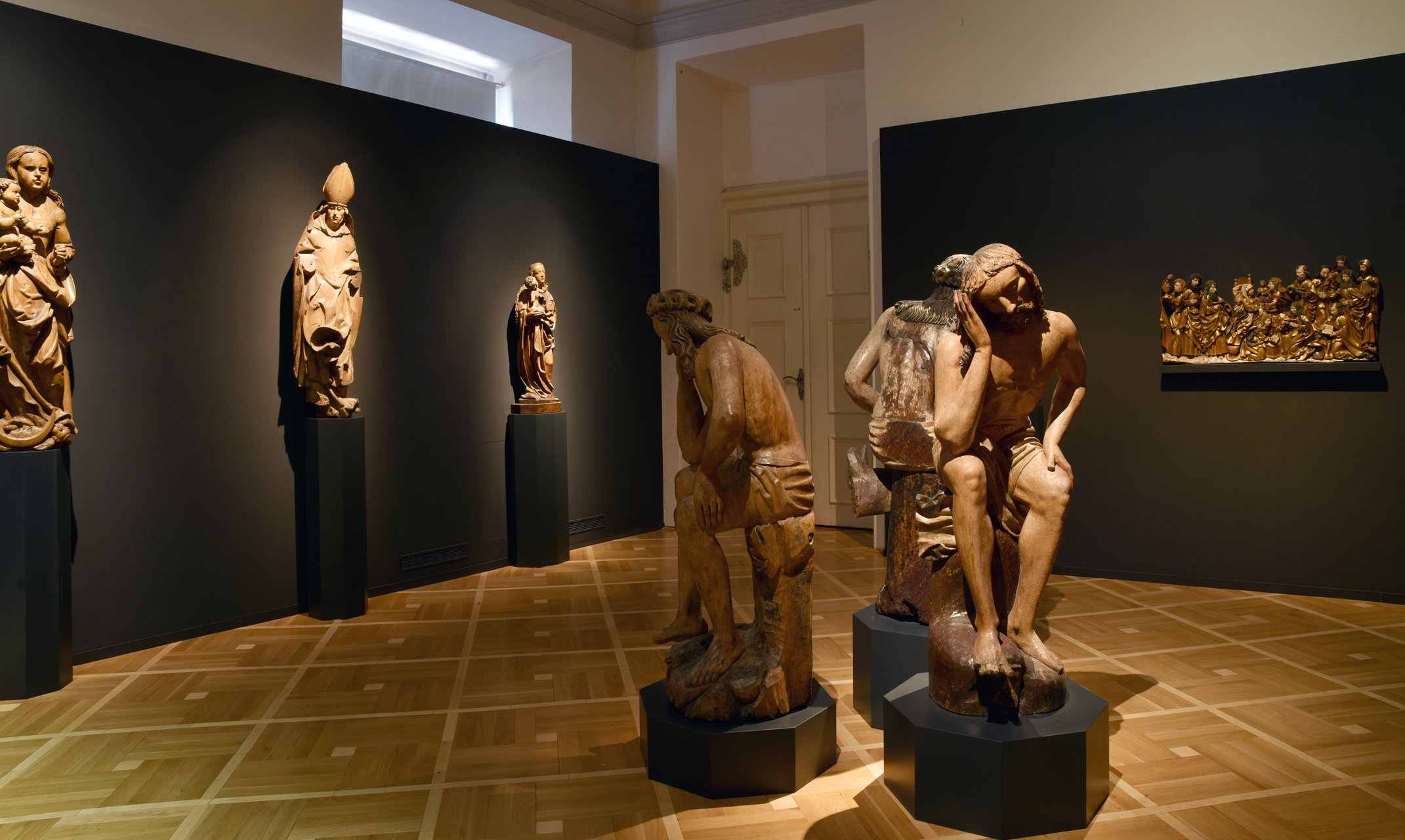

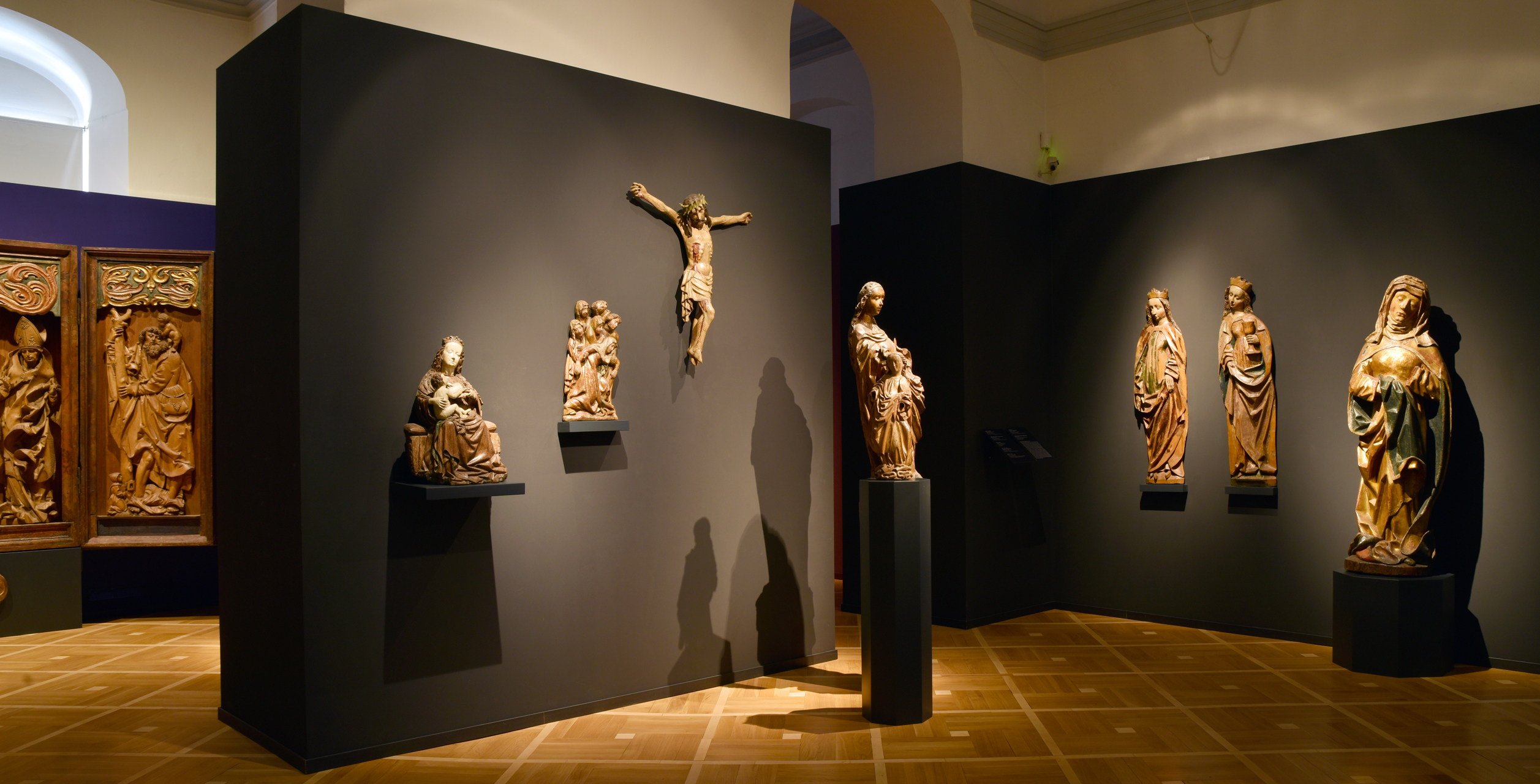

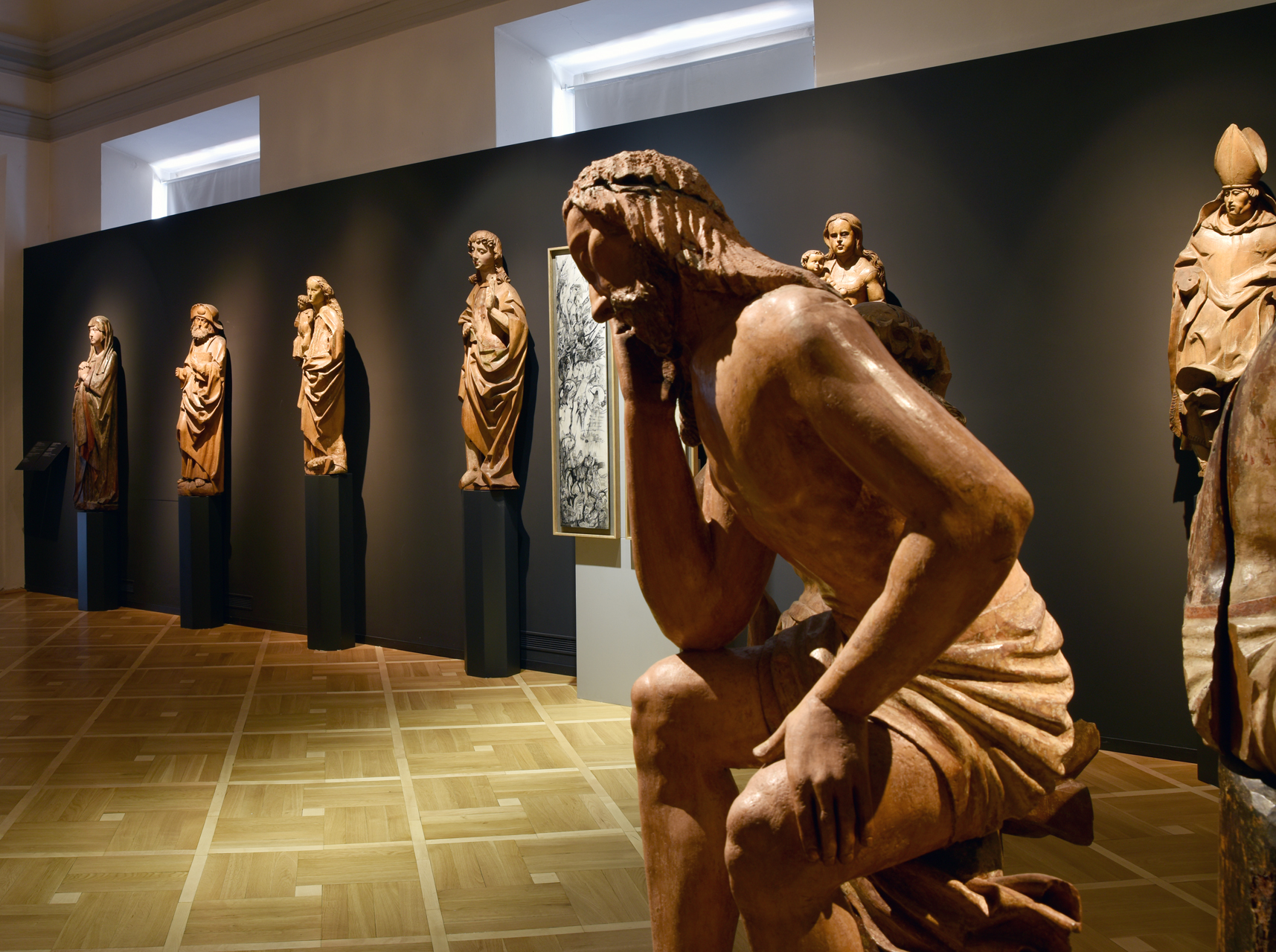

== See also ==
- Apostles from the Agony in the Garden
- Assumpta with the Baby Jesus from Kamenná Street
- Pensive Christ of Seeberg
