= Jiří Načeradský =

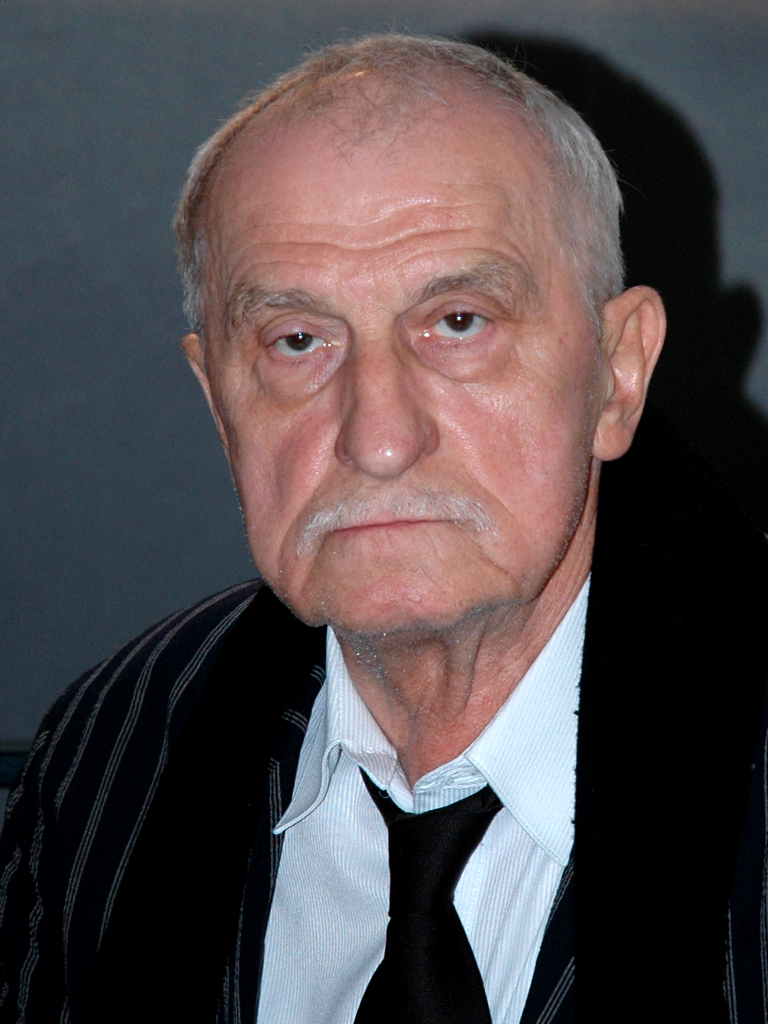
Jiří Načeradský in 2013.

Jiří Načeradský (9 September 1939 – 16 April 2014) was a Czech painter, graphic artist and educator. He was best known for his human figures, sometimes with erotic and sexual subtext and context. He was born in Sedlec-Prčice, Příbram District, Czechoslovakia.

Načeradský died on 16 April 2014 in Prague, Czech Republic, aged 74.
