= Petr Kvíčala =

Czech painter

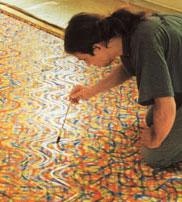
Petr Kvíčala

Petr Kvíčala (born 1960) is a Czech abstract painter and university lecturer. He is one of the most significant personalities in Czech abstract painting. At the turn of the 1980s and 1990s he became a pioneer in discovering and promoting ornament as a unique individual phenomenon. He also significantly contributed to the acceptance of aesthetic qualities of visual art. Since 1995 he has undertaken commissions for architecture-related projects in which he has collaborated with a number of leading architects both from the Czech Republic and abroad. He has been a lecturer at the Faculty of Fine Arts of the Brno University of Technology, where he is in charge of a painting studio, since 1994. His works are represented in public and private collections.

== Life ==
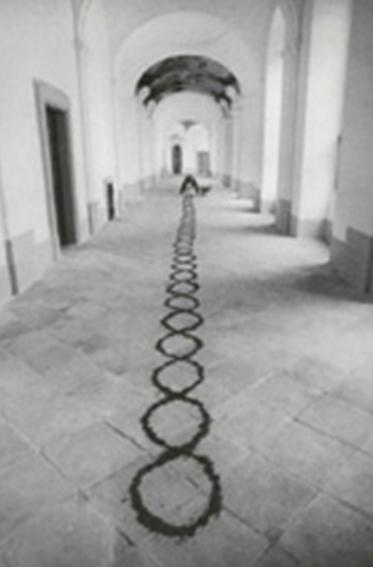
Installation in Plasy convent, 1993

Petr Kvíčala was born in Svitavy in 1960. A serious interest in fine arts he developed during his studies at the Secondary Technical School of Chemistry, led to the attempt to transfer to a school with an artistic focus, that he was denied. A major impulse of Kvíčala's artistic development came in the course of his compulsory military service in Janovice nad Úhlavou, where he met graduates of the Prague Academy of Fine Arts and began to draw portraits of other soldiers.

After finishing his military service, Kvíčala started Secondary School of Arts and Crafts in Brno, where he received a number of recommendations for his further study at the Academy. However, he was not permitted to enrol for ideological reasons. At the same time in 1982 he started working as a stoker (what he did until 1990) and began to engage in the underground movement.

A milestone in his artistic career was his participation in an exhibition in The Youth Gallery in 1985. There started author's closer co-operation with Petr Veselý and Vladimir Kokolia, which subsequently led to creation of an art group called Tovaryšstvo malířske (Society of Painting). Since the second half of the 1980s Kvíčala's work was supported by theoreticians Petr Nedoma and Jiří Valoch and he started to be repeatedly invited to participate in exhibitions of professional artists.

In 1986 Kvíčala entered the underground music scene with his band called Květen (May), working on the basis of minimalism and musical and political irony, what are themes which correlate with author's painterly work of that time. In 1989 he became a member of the art group Měkkohlaví, which was formed in response to the emergence of various artistic groups, lacking a common program, whose main objective was to promote commercially. In 1989 Kvíčala founded, along with Marian Palla and Milan Magni, a musically-performative group called Florián – Group of Haze and Kine.

After 1989 Petr Kvíčala started to be represented in state and public collections and his work was regularly reflected in professional journals. Since 1994 he has been working on the Faculty of Fine Arts in Brno, initially in the studios of conceptual tendencies and intermedia, and later as a head of one of the painting studios (his students were e.g. Jindřich Chalupecký prize laureate Barbora Klímová, Pavel Ryška, Matěj Smetana, Anežka Hošková, Petr Dub, Jana Babincová or Václav Kočí). In 2001 he received a degree of an assistant professor at the Academy of Fine Arts in Prague.

In 1995 Kvíčala made his first painterly intervention into architecture (in the apartment of architect Ivan Koleček in Lausanne) and so started a long series of art projects in architecture, which has been one of the main themes of his work until now.

== Painting ==
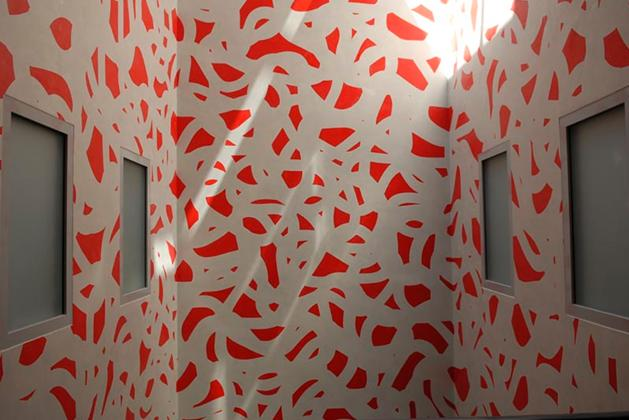
Mural for Rischart building, Marienplatz, Munich, 2007, arch. Marcus Link

Petr Kvíčala has been dealing with ornament since the mid 1980s. Both through his work and as a creative artist he confirmed the significance and importance of painting in the era when new media were violently trying to replace other forms of visual art. He works with the simplest ornament, consisting of wavy lines, broken arches or loops. His source of inspiration- landscape – was transformed into an extremely reduced visual vernacular, the basic elements of which are ornamental lines.

His beginnings were punctuated by attempts to express nature's principles using the medium of visual art but it the second half of the 1980s the artistic means employed became extremely unorthodox. His creative aspirations from that period were typified by the limitless merging of various disciplines: he created texts inspired by what he had experienced in the landscape and drew simple sketches of fields. At the same time, he was a member of several ensembles dabbing in minimalist music and musique concrète whose productions crossed the boundary between theatrical and performance and animated sculptural installation.

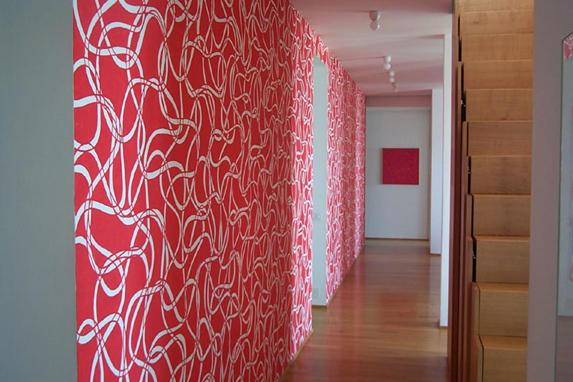
Apartment of Ivan Koleček, Lausanne

At the turn of 1980s and 1990s, Petr Kvíčala's work seemed to display an affinity with the broad stream of post-modernist Czech painting as hinted at by the clear colours of the paintings, which enclosed colour surfaces within boundaries and used archetypal-geometric elements. Today, such a general classification is less justifiable. Obviously, rather than making post-modernist quotations and providing a symbolic content to the paintings, so characteristic for the painters from the circle of the Tvrdohlaví group, Kvíčala was more interested in probing the possibilities of the painting medium itself. The orderly inner arrangements of Kvíčala's work is determined by employing lines approached as ornaments. Of these, the undulating line – a rhythmic painterly gesture in time – if featured most often. The lines are combined and composed according to clear pre-determined rules of algorithms which nevertheless may produce unexpected results. Attention was drawn to the similarities between his works and ornamental paintings in folk architecture (the Waves 1991) or to the affinity to the abstract cave paintings.

Kvíčala indicates his inspiration from "low" culture by using elements from artistic crafts or industrial manufacturing. In the Wallpapers (1987–1988) and Festive Tablecloths for Everyday (1992–1994) cycles he balanced on the hard-to-define line between ornaments on utility objects and artistic expression. He also emphasized manual, and therefore imperfect, reproduction of the ornamental rhythm. However, at the initial level, Kvíčala is not concerned with a post-modern game of aligning various languages, but rather he wishes to rehabilitate ornament as such. He values its visual effectiveness, rational order and its possibility of continuous variation. Kvíčala showed great invention and desire to experiment within his intentionally abridged vocabulary. Among his works we can find procedural paintings, where the surface of the painting can be looked upon as a relic of the time spent on the execution (60 Days of Red, Blue and Yellow, 1996, Monochromes).

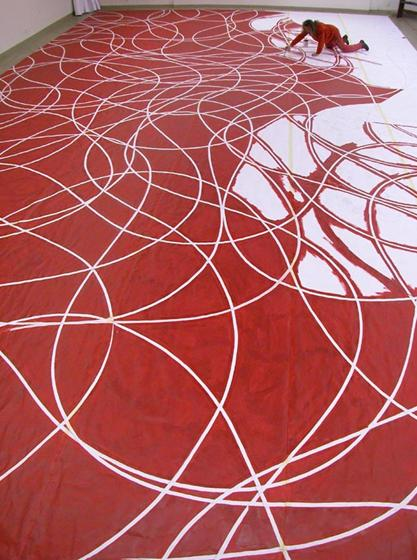
Work on sketches for ceiling painting "Watermelon-Cut Ceiling Dance", 2004

In Memory cycle (2001–2003) Kvíčala works with a negative definition of lines, delineating them with a surrounding red surface, a memory of lines and fragments of ornaments, their imprint in the mind. Working with broad lines led author to an opposite extreme: using white paint he reduced ornamental lines to the very extreme of technical possibilities of traditional painting (Fine Stripes – Coded Ornaments 2008).

The recent works by Petr Kvíčala implement the artist's accustomed repertoire of line ornaments, combining waves, broken lines and loops. The special optical effect is achieved by a multiple repetition of thin parallel lines of the two basic ornaments and an intentionally limited colour palette, relying on a simple rhythm of two to three colours. Special prominence is given to minuscule deviations and "flaws" in the applied order. These serve as another, improvised, level of rhythmicizing the paintings although they can also be perceived as a generalization of the natural and human responses to environmental changes (cycles Dogon 2007, Pacific 2008, Flow 2009).

== Installation ==
Since 1993 Petr Kvíčala has created a number of ephemeral installations – mostly on the floors of galleries and in public space. Major installations are e.g. send lines in Plasy convent (1993), the red pigment installation in Behémot gallery in Prague (1994) or contemporary Zig Zag street art in Brno (2009).

== Architectonic interventions ==
Since the second half of 1990s painterly interventions into architecture are one of the main topics of Kvíčala's work. He uses principles and themes from his paintings, which he strives to transfer to the specific architectural space. Kvíčala is also a coordinator of international educational and research project 2B2A, dealing with cooperation between art and architecture, its theoretical reflection and practical implementation.

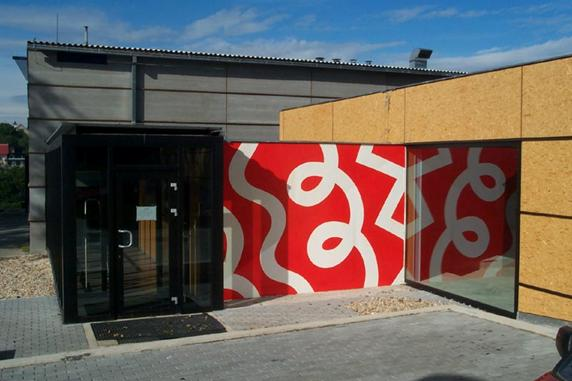
Mural for sportshall, Litomyšl, 2001

The very first painterly intervention into architecture Kvíčala made, was in the apartment of architect Ivan Koleček in Lausanne. "Southern part of the apartment, with windows facing the lake, contains the living space and the adjoining studies, while the northern part faces the town. I noticed that the southern exterior "pervades" the house to such an extent that any change in weather and the continual play of light are reflected, by the great mirror of the lake surface, in the living space and becomes ts integral component. As a result, I decided to underline the opposing role of the dividing role relative to the view."

Major international project Kvíčala worked on in 2004, was new Deutsche Bundesbank building in Chemnitz (architect Josep Luís Mateo), where he realized the ceiling painting "Watermelon Cut – Ceiling Dance". The painting on the entrance hall ceiling (exceeding 150 m^{2} in area) is both a counterpoint and to the overall logic of the building and its complement. The paint application technique left the brush strokes visible as a sign of a human, yet artificial intervention in stark contrast to the abstraction of the organic construction materials, free of any trace of craftsmanship. Retaining the brushwork proved to be of importance in integrating the work within the architectural space, both as a nod to the process of making the painting and an element evoking the organic nature of the painting – a cut through the living tissue of a solid architectural form.

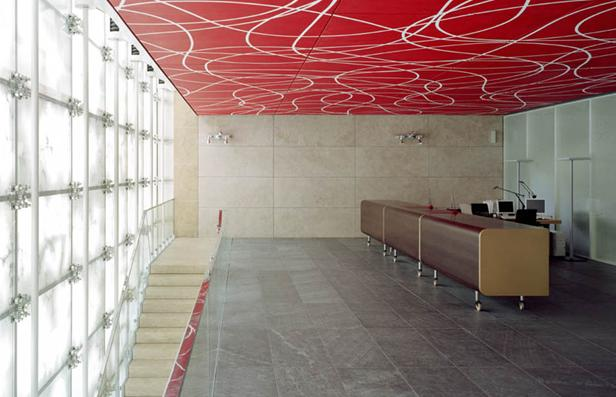
Ceiling painting " Watermelon Cut - Ceiling Dance", 2004, new building of Deutsche Bundesbank, Chemnitz

In numerous sketches prepared for the painting I first examined the rhythm of the division relative to the format as well as the harmonization of colours with regards to the materials within the space. I continued by producing two cardboard paintings at the actual scale in order to be able to precisely determine the density of the network of lines, the magnitude of the waves and their thickness. While working on the cardboards I concluded that waves of this magnitude cannot be drawn using a standard method, as their dimensions surpass the physical capability of human being. I resorted to attaching the charcoal that I used for drawing on a long pole and, by standing on tip-toe and gyrating the whole body including carefully thought-out legwork, I negotiated smooth curves. I performed something short of a dance during which the body movement is transmitted into the lines drawn.

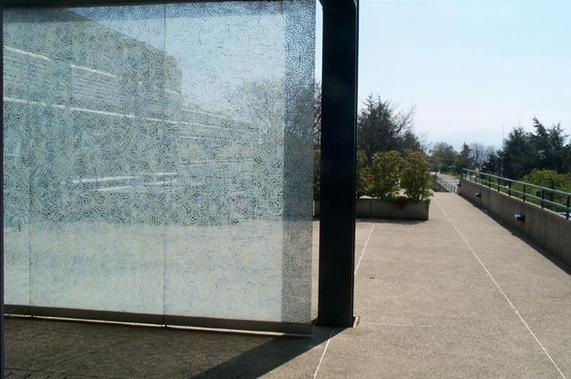
University of Technology EPFL, Lausanne

In 2005 Petr Kvíčala cooperated, with architects A. Novák and P. Valenta, on the reconstruction of the historical building of Reduta theatre in Brno. He is author of the mural "40 Days of Red" in Reduta ballroom hall, atrium floor and ceiling arches of the theatre café. The mural consists of layers of red undulating lines laid next to one another. on a red background. In each of the superimposed layer the undulating lines have a different direction. The monochrome effect of the red paint, together with the colour of the parquet flooring arranged into historical patterns conjures up a solemn ambience nurtured by the rare occurrence of the colour red in the nature patterns, and even more so by its endorsement of the cultural and historical tradition. "The regular layers of repeatedly painted undulating lines impregnates the walls with aspects of time, exertion and sumptuousness. No celebration can take place without show and splendor as, in essence, a 'purposeless' celebration is the most natural human response to the mystery of life".

The motive of Memory cycle was used for wall paintings in Rischart building in Munich (2007). The target to achieve was to create environment which is not only positive but also outstanding and which makes it possible for the employees to identify with. Those paintings are repeated in the areas of central communications: in the corridors of the cloakrooms located in the basement, in the high lit part of the staircase leading from the second to the fifth floor, as well as in the central area in front of the offices of the owners and in the meeting room of the fifth floor, around the staircase leading to the café for the employees on the sixth floor.. "Restricting the lines by surrounding red areas, the memory of the line and fragments of the ornaments is a sort of an imprint on one's mind. I thought of the ancient concept of Crete in which unlike in the Greek one everything is floating, everything is shown in non-existence and does not manifest its achievement and the drama of the fight. It is a world of gardens determined for solitary confinement, for rest and meditation, for the world I sometimes long for and which I can relate to."

== Other ==
Since 1980s Kvíčala has also created number of painted objects, since 1990s he has been applying his motives to utility items, especially to textiles (e.g. his cooperation with Denisa Nová, DNB) or China.
