= Jaroslava Pešicová =

Czech painter and printmaker (1935–2015)

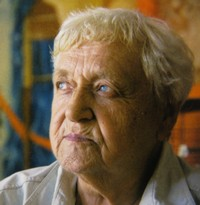
- Portrait of Jaroslava Pešicová
- Born: 30 December 1935; Prague, Czechoslovakia
- Died: 30 August 2015 (aged 79)
- Education: School of Applied Arts; Academy of Fine Arts, Prague
- Occupations: Painter and printmaker
- Spouse: František Štorek

Jaroslava Pešicová (/ˈpɛʃɪθɒvɑː/; 30 December 1935 – 30 August 2015) was a Czech painter and printmaker.

Pešicová was born in Prague, and studied at that city's School of Applied Arts. After graduating in 1954, she attended the Academy of Fine Arts, Prague, from which she graduated in 1960. Her instructors included Miloslav Holý, Antonín Pelc, and Vladimir Sychra. She was married to sculptor František Štorek, with whom she was a member of the group Etapa. Beginning in 1975 she worked with the studio of Marie Hoppe-Teinitzerová, for whom she designed tapestries.

One print by Pešicová is in the collection of the National Gallery of Art. Her work has also appeared on postage stamps produced by the Czech Republic.

== Awards ==
- In 1967, she won the Odeon publishing house award at the First Prague Salon.
- In 2003, she received the European Prize for Artistic and Cultural Activity from the European Union of the Arts.
- In December 2017, the Czech postal service issued a stamp based on oil paintings by Pešicová. The stamp was made by engraver Václav Fajt. The cover of the first day also features an overprint on the motifs of graphic design by Pešicová. Imprints and registers of stamp engravings were also issued.
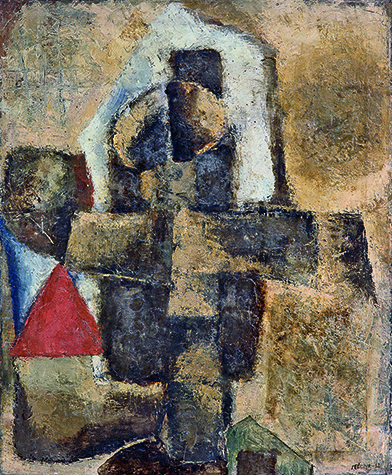
Children's Play (1963)

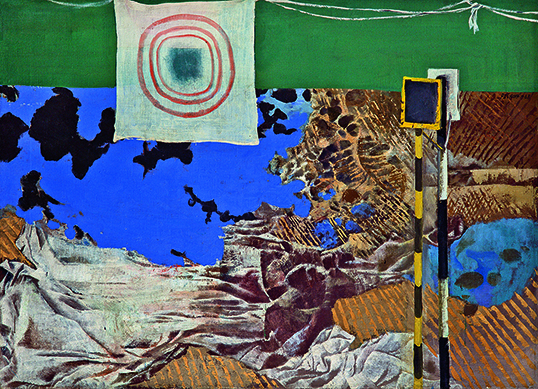
Target in Landscape (1968)

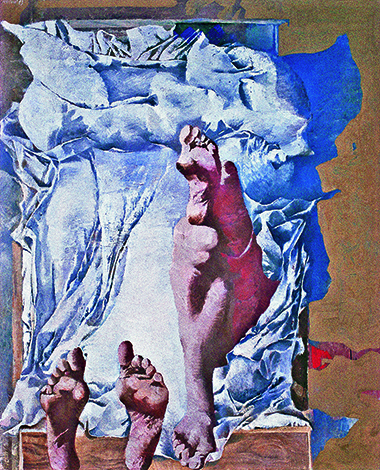
Bed (1969)

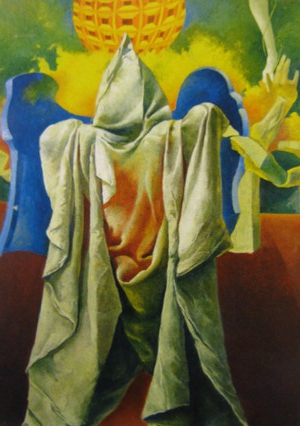
Requiem (2003)
