= Pietà from the Dominican Monastery in Cheb =

Gothic wooden sculpture

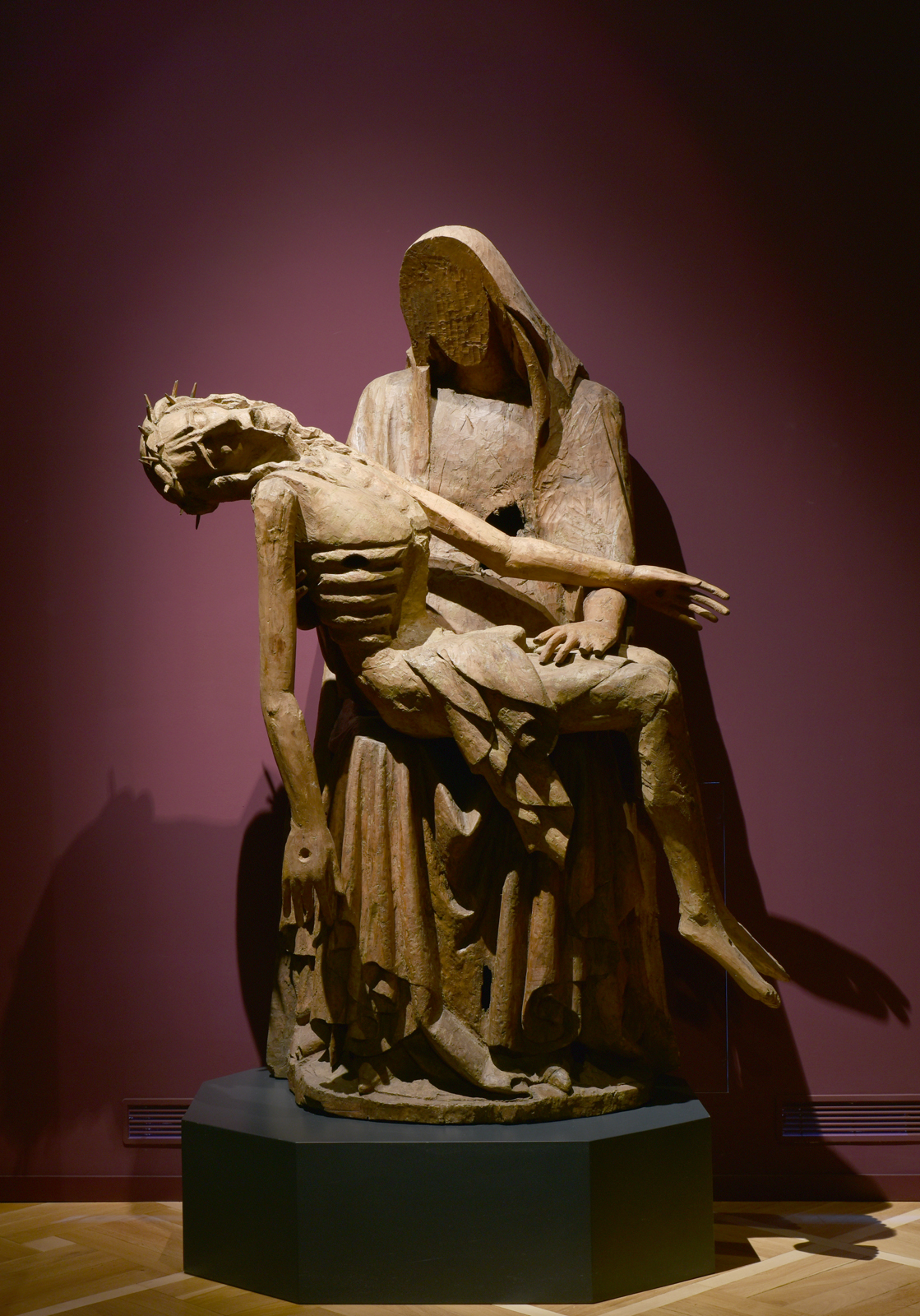
Pietà from the Dominican Monastery in Cheb (1350), GVU Cheb

The Pietà from the Dominican Monastery in Cheb (ca. 1350) is a Gothic wooden pieta sculpture set in Cheb, Czech Republic.

An historical and artistically significant sculpture set, The Cheb Pieta is part of the collections of the Gallery of Fine Arts in Cheb (inv. no. P 273).

== Description ==
The sculptural group consists of two separate statues in the round sculpted from alder wood. Its overall dimensions are 161 x 96 x 60 cm.

The statues are deeply hollowed out on the rear side. During the restoration carried out by Mojmír Hamsík in 1972 the non-original polychrome and a number of later additions distorting the overall appearance were removed, and the stability of the statues was ensured by pinning them. The face of the Virgin Mary, which had been cut off in the past and replaced by a new one, was likewise removed. The sculpture was first mentioned in the literature by Josef Opitz, who established its connections with German sculpture.

== Context ==
During the 13th century, the theme of the Virgin Mary with the dead body of Christ came to be portrayed separately from the scene of the Lamentation of Christ. It began to appear in sculpture around 1300. The Pietà in Cheb represents the oldest iconographic type, known as the mystical or heroic Pietà. In terms of form it can be classified among the eastern group of vertical Pietàs which preceded the horizontal and diagonal types of High and Late Gothic. Similar Pietàs have been preserved in central Germany, Bavaria, Silesia, and Lower Lusatia. This work has especially close similarities to the Pietà of Scheuerfeld (Museum Veste Coburg), which is regarded as the initial type, the Pietà of Erfurt, and the Pietà from Lebus.

All the related Pietàs are characterised by monumental dimensions (161 to 185 cm in height) and further common formal and compositional features, a drastic interpretation of the theme, and often a similar material (mostly poplar wood). Christ's head, fallen back lifelessly and with the mouth open, convincingly expresses the horror of death. The Scheuerfeld Pietà has natural, logical, and correctly observed folds in the drapery, whereas related German Pietàs are characterised by a stylisation adopted from their model, in particular a trend towards expressive exaggeration. The same applies to the sharply carved tubiform folds in the lower half of the sculpture and the graphically stringent interpretation of the hair, facial features, and other severely stylised body shapes and draperies. In contrast to the Erfurt Pietà, the Cheb Pietà has no horizontal fringe to the drapery, and, instead of a linear severity in the folds, the Virgin's garment has soft, broader, tubiform folds wrapped across each other, as was common in sculptures after the mid-14th century.

The exaggerated emphasis on Christ's wounds, the massive crown of thorns, and the expressive alternation of concave and convex shapes connect the heroic Pietàs with the crucifixi dolorosi of the late 13th and early 14th centuries. Both types of sculpture were intended to arouse the compassion of the faithful for Christ's suffering. The Cheb chronicler recorded a case when the preaching of a monk in front of a statue of a similar type inflamed a crowd into passion, so that they set out directly from the church to carry out a pogrom against the Jews.

The Cheb Pietà served as a model for several later Pietàs from the second half of the 14th century, produced concurrently with the new type of Parler horizontal Pietàs. The heroic Pietà from Jihlava, with a proportionately smaller figure of Christ, belongs to the Pietà corpusculum type, is based on a different model, and has greater similarities with some sculptures from northern Italy.

The heroic vertical Pietàs were connected with a type of devotion directed towards Christ, the Passion, and the Eucharist, which was cultivated in particular in female Cistercian monasteries. The themes of the Passion and the Eucharist also appear in Dominican texts. The Dominicans in Cheb belonged to the Saxon province of the order, where Pietàs were produced. The “Premyslid Crucifix” from the Dominican Church of the Exaltation of the Holy Cross in Jihlava also has its origin in the milieu of the Dominican order, which fostered the cult of Corpus Christi.

== Other works ==
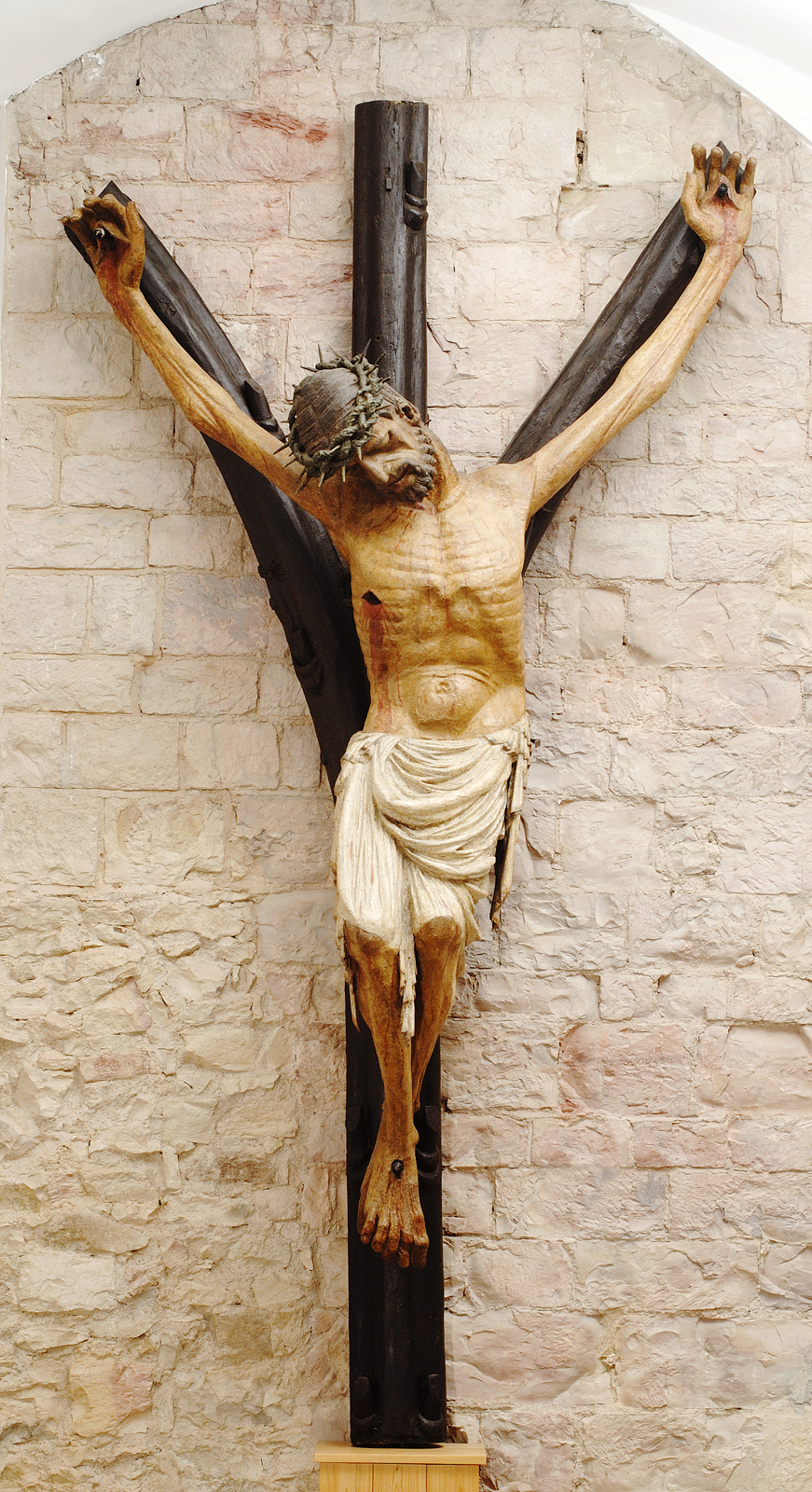
Premyslid Crucifix (1330)

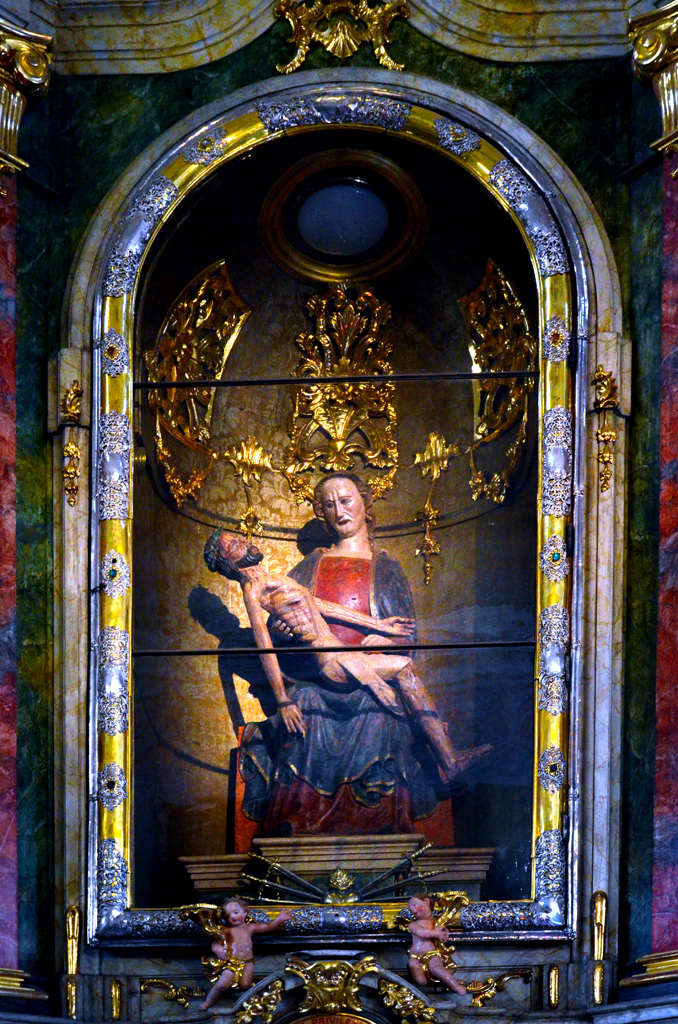
Pietà from Jihlava (1330–1370)

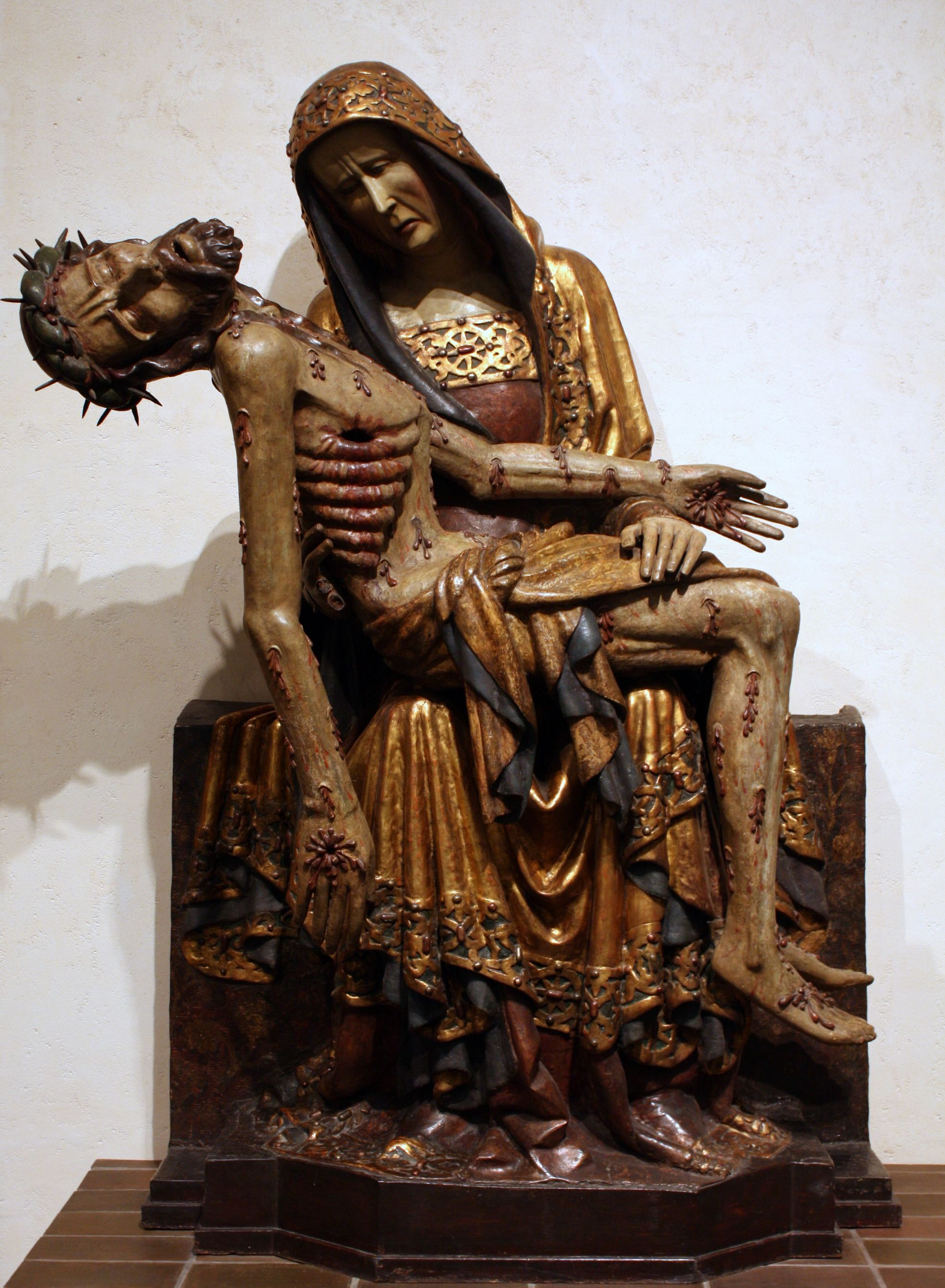
Pietà from Lebus in Silesia (1360–1370)

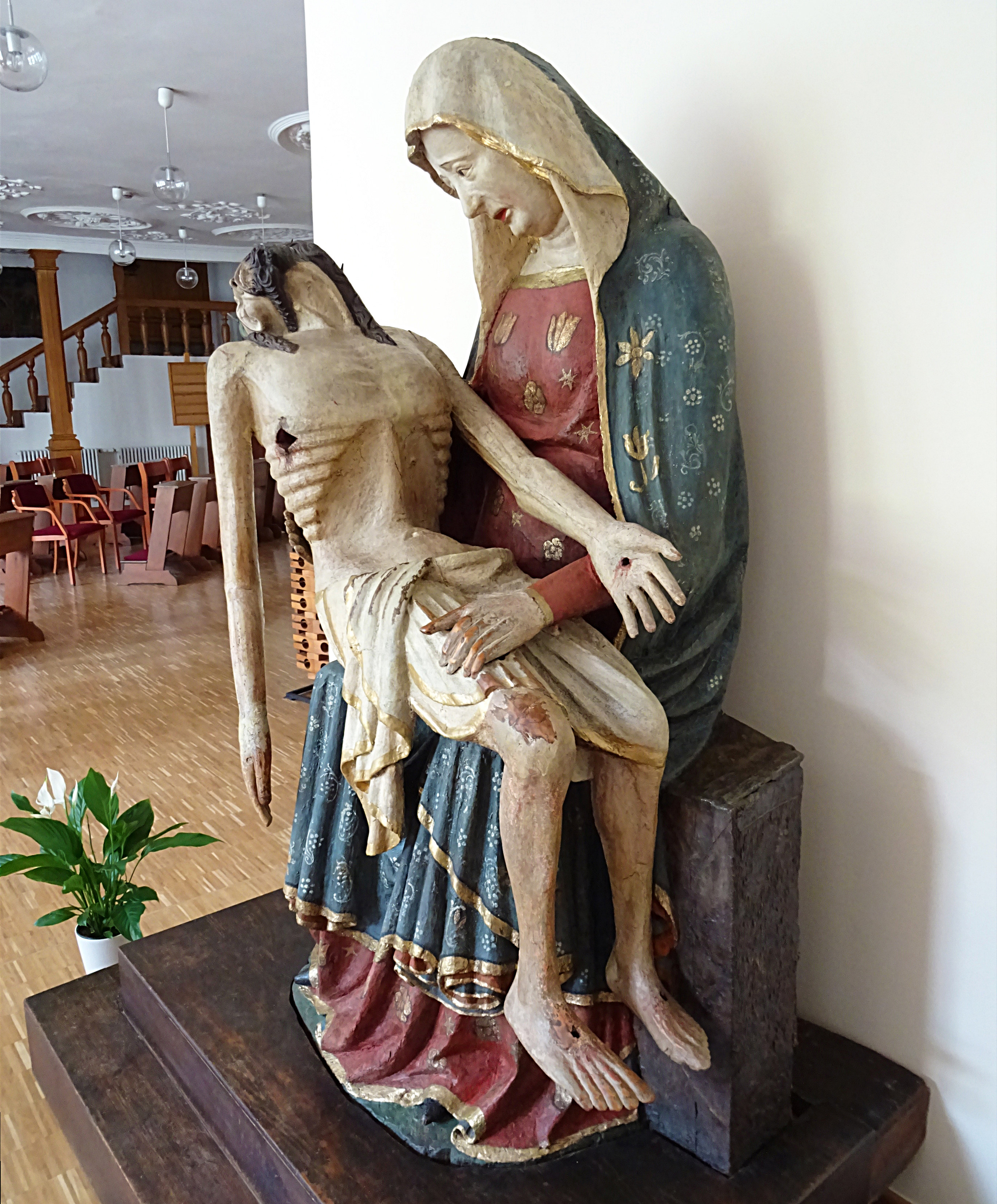
Pietà from Erfurt

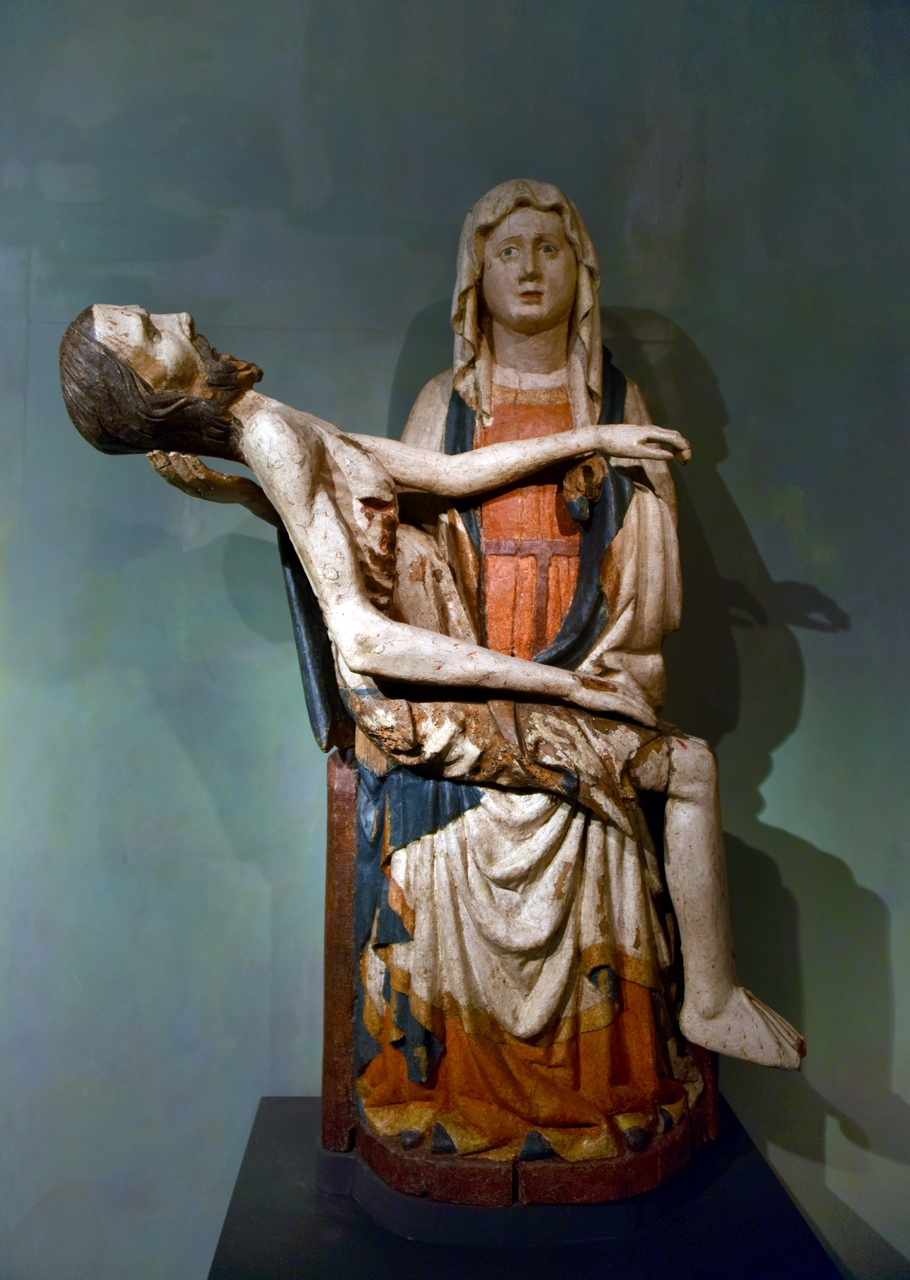
Pietà from Lásenice (1380–1400), National Gallery in Prague

== Sources ==
- Jiří Vykoukal (ed.), Umění gotiky na Chebsku, Galerie výtvarného umění v Chebu 2009, ISBN 978-80-85016-92-5; Jiří Vykoukal (ed.), Gothic Art in the Cheb Region, Cheb 2009, ISBN 978-80-85016-93-2
- Albert Kutal, Gotické sochařství, in: Dějiny českého výtvarného umění, Academia Praha 1984
- Albert Kutal, České gotické sochařství 1350–1450, Praha 1962
- Jana Ševčíková, Chebská gotická plastika, Galerie výtvarného umění v Chebu 1975
