= Ulbrich =

Ulbrich may refer to:

- Ulbrich (surname), a surname of German origin
- Ulbrich (company), a metal and stainless steel distribution and rolling company

== See also ==
- Ulrich, a German given name and surname
- Ulbricht, a German surname
