= Ulbrich (surname) =

Ulbrich is a surname of German origin. Notable people with this surname include:

- Carla Ulbrich, American singer-songwriter and guitarist
- Christian Ulbrich, German business executive
- Jeff Ulbrich (born 1977), former American football linebacker
- Josef Ulbrich (1843–1910), Austro-Hungarian lawyer and university teacher
- Maximilian Ulbrich (born 2000), German sport shooter
- Michelle Ulbrich (born 1996), German footballer
- Oskar Eberhard Ulbrich (1879–1952), German botanist and mycologist
- Peter Ulbrich (born 1955), German fencer
- Stephanie Ulbrich (born 1950), American politician
- Walter Ulbrich (1910–1991), German film producer
- Wilhelm Ulbrich (1846–1922), German journalist and poet
