= Bernard Kester =

American artist, designer (1928–2018)

- Born: March 25, 1928; Salt Lake City, Utah, U.S.
- Died: October 26, 2018 (aged 90); Studio City, Los Angeles, California, U.S.
- Other names: J. Bernard Kester, Bernard J. Kester
- Education: University of California, Los Angeles (BFA, MFA)
- Occupations: Designer, artist, curator, writer
- Known for: Pottery, textile design

Bernard Kester (1928–2018) was an American designer, artist, curator, and writer, known for his pottery and textile design. He was instrumental in the studio craft movement in the United States through his work as a curator and exhibit designer at the Los Angeles County Museum of Art, and he worked to elevated craft and fiber works to contemporary art found in museums. Kester founded the fiber art program at the University of California, Los Angeles (UCLA). He was named an honorary fellow by the American Craft Council (ACC) in 1980.

== Biography ==
Bernard Kester was born on March 25, 1928, in Salt Lake City, Utah. When he was a young child, the family temporarily moved to Newport Beach, California, followed by a move to Long Beach, California. He started making art in kindergarten.

Kester attended the University of California, Los Angeles (UCLA), and graduated with a BFA degree and MFA degree.

From 1956 to 1991, he taught at UCLA, starting with ceramics and eventually switched to teaching weaving. Kester founded the fiber art program at the University of California, Los Angeles (UCLA). Some of Kester’s notable students included Gerhardt Knodel, Maren Hassinger, and Neda Al-Hilali.

Kester worked as a curator and exhibition designer at the Los Angeles County Museum of Art. He worked to elevated craft and fiber art to contemporary art found in museums. His exhibition design work was included in the show, The Legacy of Genghis Khan: Courtly Art and Culture in West Asia, 1256–1353 (2003).
