= Adolf Tachezy =

Austrian and Czech politician

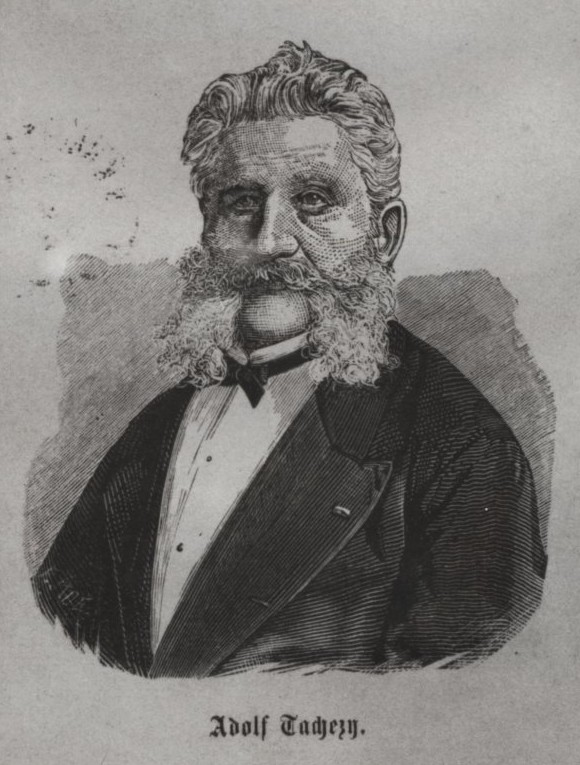

Member of the Czech Parliament
- In office 1867–1878

Mayor of Cheb
- In office 1873–1882

Personal details
- Born: 20 February 1814 Cheb, Austria-Hungary
- Died: 25 March 1892 (aged 78) Cheb, Austria-Hungary
- Occupation: Politician

Adolf Tachezy, also known as Leopold Adolf Tachezy (20 February 1814 – 25 March 1892), was an Austrian and Czech politician. He was a member of the Czech Provincial Assembly from 1867 to 1878, and served as the mayor of Cheb from 1873 to 1882.

== Biography ==
Tachezy was born in Cheb, Austro-Hungarian Empire (now Czech Republic) to a family of pharmacists. He attended high school in Cheb, and then graduated from Charles University in Prague, majoring in pharmacy. In 1839, he returned to Cheb to take over his father's pharmacy, U Černého orla, and from 1841 on, he was an officer in the Střeleckého club in Cheb (in 1843 and his centurion, in 1868, Major).

Hee was politically active in the Cheb region during the Revolutions of 1848, together with Anton Gschier and Forter. From 1848 onward, he sat on the municipal assembly and council. In 1848, he was a member of the deputation which the town sent to Minister Franz von Pillersdorf, in which they demanded greater autonomy for the Cheb region along with the Czech regions. Later, he was also a member of the district school board, the Cheb Bureau of Chamber of Commerce and Trade, chairman of urban societies and other local corporations and associations.

In the 1860s, he was involved in provincial politics. In the Czech provincial elections in January 1867, he was elected to the assembly in the curia business and trade chambers for Cheb District. He defended his mandate in the circuit shortly after the provincial elections held in March 1867. He was elected in provincial elections in 1870 and 1872.

From 1873 to 1882, he served as mayor of Cheb. While in office he influenced the development of the nearby health spa town Franzensbad. During his tenure as mayor, the town opened a new theater and the school building. In recognition of his accomplishments, he received the Order of Franz Joseph.

He died in 1892 and is buried in Cheb.
