= Winged Altarpiece of Our Lady from Seeberg =

Late Gothic altarpiece

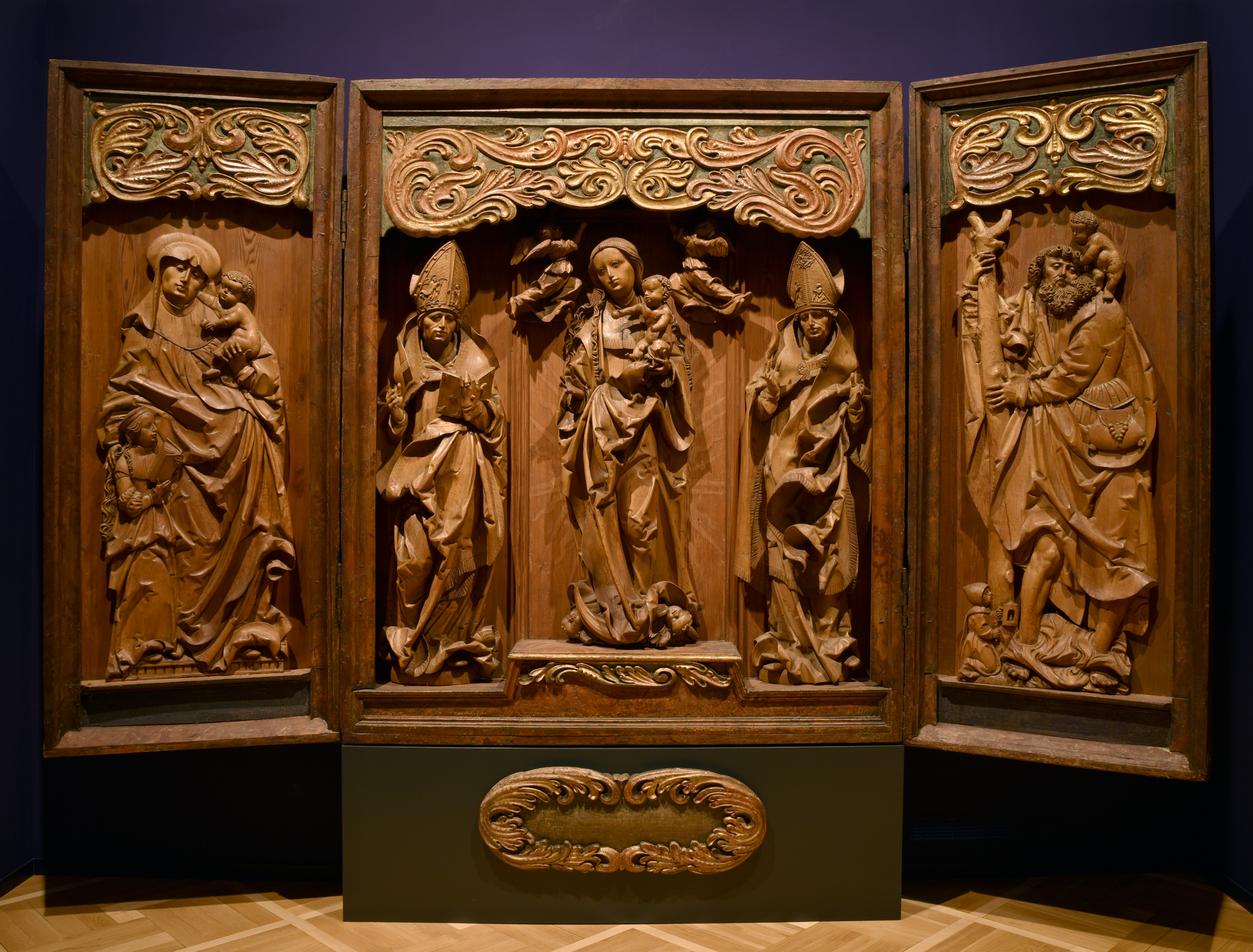
Winged Altarpiece of Our Lady from Seeberg (ca. 1520), Gallery of Fine Arts in Cheb

The Winged Altarpiece of Our Lady from Seeberg (ca. 1520) is a Late Gothic altarpiece originally located in the Church of St Wolfgang in Seeberg (today Ostroh). The sculptor, known as the Master of the Marian Altarpiece from Seeberg, received his training in the workshop of the Bavarian sculptor Hans Leinberger, and so the works of the two artists are similar in style and date from the same time. The workshop of the Master of the Marian Altarpiece from Seeberg was most probably located directly in Cheb, where it combined the local woodcarving tradition of the successful workshop of Hans Maler with the contemporary fashionable style of the Danube School. The altarpiece from Seeberg is one of the few outstanding works of Late Gothic sculpture to have been preserved in the Cheb region. It is displayed in the permanent exhibition of the Gallery of Fine Arts in Cheb.

== History of the altarpiece from Seeberg ==
In the older literature the anonymous woodcarver was also known as the Master of the Altarpiece of St Jodoc, but it was not until 1974 that Ševčíková said the altarpiece originally came from the Church of St Jodoc in Cheb, without giving any evidence for this. On the other hand, the altarpiece is repeatedly documented by researchers as having been in the Late Gothic presbytery of the castle Church of St Wolfgang in Seeberg. This 13th-century castle, which originally belonged to the town of Cheb and then from 1434 to Kaspar Schlick, was purchased in a considerably dilapidated condition in 1461 by Kaspar Juncker of Seeberg (Burgrave of Cheb and diplomat in the service of King George of Poděbrady). Juncker founded the Church of St Wolfgang on a separate promontory opposite the castle on the other side of the River Seebach. The construction of the church was completed by his widow Anna Schlick, who is buried with him in the church. From 1497 the castle belonged to the brothers Konhrad and Jošt of Neuberg (Neiperg), and after 1527 to the four sons of Konhrad of Neuberg.

Konhrad of Neuberg commissioned an older altarpiece with the scene of the Lamentation of Christ (1498) and a Marian altarpiece with the figures of the bishops St Wolfgang (patron saint of the church) and St Nicholas (patron saint of Cheb). The altarpiece can be shown to have been in the Church of St Wolfgang before 1870 and is last mentioned in a publication dating from 1915. Since 1901 it has been listed in the inventory of Cheb Museum.

According to a Baroque tin plaque from the year 1683, originally located beneath the feet of the Assumpta but no longer extant, the altarpiece was originally consecrated in 1520. In the Baroque period, an upper section was added to the altarpiece with a statue of St Valentine and other additions, and it survived in this form until the Second World War. During the war the statues were removed and hidden, and later exhibited separately in Cheb Museum. Eventually they were transferred to the newly established Gallery of Fine Arts in Cheb in 1962.

== Description and context ==
The altarpiece with movable wings (centre 187 x 155 cm, wings 187 x 79 cm), shows the scene of the Virgin Mary taken up into heaven and glorified (the Assumpta), depicted between two bishops. On her right is evidently St Wolfgang (patron saint of the church), on the left St Nicholas (patron saint of Cheb). The same arrangement of the figures, identified by their attributes, was to be seen on an Early Baroque altar painting from Seeberg castle church, as described by Karl Siegl in 1915. The painting was handed over to the Cheb District National Committee in 1971 and is now missing.

The relief sculptures of the bishops are holding a book and do not have attributes. According to Turnwald, an upper section was added to the altarpiece in 1683 and polychrome was applied to the sculptures. This was removed during later restorations in 1970, 1972, and 2005. Also dating from 1683 is the wooden plaque on the altarpiece corpus, on which the bishops are designated as St Burkhard (patron saint of Würzburg), St Erhard (patron saint of Regensburg), and St Valentine. The plaque, today displayed with the altarpiece, also gives the date the work was created (1520).

All three relief sculptures within the corpus are characterised by virtuoso woodcarving work, which has no parallel among extant Late Gothic sculptures in Cheb. On the folding wings of the altarpiece are on the left St Anne with the Virgin and Child, and on the right St Christopher. These sculptures, executed in bas-relief, are the product of a workshop, and the carving work is derived from an older Cheb tradition. The statue on the upper section, representing St Valentine, was not added until the Baroque renovation in 1683. It has a rougher finish and comes from another altarpiece, where it evidently stood on the left of the central sculpture and was half-turned towards it.

=== Madonna on a crescent moon (Assumpta) ===
A high relief sculpture carved from lindenwood, 116.5 cm in height, hollowed out from behind, with minor damage to details. The crown and sceptre were removed during restoration, because they were later additions.

The Virgin Mary is standing on a crescent moon and a slightly raised plinth with the heads of two cherubs. She is being crowned by two hovering angels, executed in mid-relief. In terms of composition, the figure of the Assumpta is based on older models, in particular Leinberger’s Madonna of the Rosary in Landshut and the Madonna from the pilgrimage church in Scheuern. The Virgin holds a small naked Infant Jesus high on her left side above the free flexed leg. In her right hand she probably had an apple or a pear. The Infant holds a small fruit in his right hand; part of his left hand is missing. Painted on his breast is a necklace of red beads, which was a protective apotropaic symbol in the Middle Ages. The sublime nature of the Mother of God is reflected in her sumptuous undergarment with its close-fitting bodice and high collar.

Unlike Leinberger’s Bavarian Madonnas, the Seeberg Virgin Mary is holding the Infant Jesus above the free flexed leg. Otherwise, Mary’s overgarment is almost identical with them, including the way it is pleated and the fashionable details of the underbodice. The Virgin also has a similar rolled pearl virgin headband, enclosing long flowing hair.

=== St Wolfgang (St Burkhard) ===
A high relief sculpture carved from lindenwood, 127.5 cm in height, hollowed out from behind. In his left hand the bishop holds a half-open book, and in his right hand he evidently held a bishop’s crozier. He is wearing episcopal robes (an alb, a dalmatic, and a pluvial fastened by a brooch), his hands are gloved, and on his head he has a mitre with two lappets and a relief of the Annunciation. The hem of his cloak is decorated by carving work.

=== St Nicholas (St Erhard) ===
A high relief sculpture carved from lindenwood, 126 cm in height, hollowed out from behind. The bishop is wearing gloves, in his right hand he evidently held a crozier, and his left hand is raised in the gesture of a confessor (?). On his mitre is the relief scene Noli me tangere. The hem of his cloak is decorated by carving work. Of the central three sculptures, this one is of the highest quality, and most closely resembles the works of Hans Leinberger.

The facial type of the two bishops is similar to works from the second decade of the 16th century attributed to Matthäus Kreniss, or to the sculpture of St Erasmus from the Marian altar in Frauenberg-Landshut. The motifs of the robes are derived from the early work of Hans Leinberger – especially typical are the narrow tubiform edges of the folds, punctuated by notches, and the twisting of the hems of the robes into smaller cone-shaped forms. The fully three-dimensional folds of the robes of all three figures have a separate artistic role. They combine prominent folds with sharp broken edges and cone-shaped twisted tips. The delicacy of some details, such as the carving of the reliefs on the mitres of the two bishops, indicate that the sculptures were not intended to be polychromed.

=== St Valentine ===
A statue carved from lindenwood, 116 cm in height, fashioned from behind. In his left hand the bishop is holding a half-open book, and in his right hand he evidently held a crozier. The mitre is smooth, without relief decoration. The upper section with a statue of St Valentine, in a shallow aedicule enclosed by conches, was not added until the Baroque period, when the sculptures were also polychromed.

=== St Anne with the Virgin and Child ===
A mid-relief measuring 123.5 x 52.5 x 9 cm, inv. no. P 31

St Anne holds a naked Infant Jesus in her left hand, while her right hand rests on the shoulder of the Virgin Mary. The Infant, portrayed as a lively child, holds an apple in his left hand, and embraces his grandmother round the neck with his right hand. The bareheaded Virgin Mary, with a girl’s headband, stands on her mother’s right side and reads from a half-open book.

=== St Christopher ===
A mid-relief carved from lindenwood measuring 131 x 51 x 9 cm, inv. no. P 30

St Christopher is standing in waves and leans with both hands on a pilgrim’s staff. The Infant Jesus on his left shoulder is naked and holds onto his hair. By St Christopher’s right leg kneels a pilgrim with a lantern, with which he lights St Christopher on his journey. This scene is common in the late Middle Ages and is derived, for example, from a copperplate engraving (1495) or woodcut (1500-1502) by Abrecht Dürer.

Both sculptures are based on modern models from the Lower Bavarian region. The two sculptures on the wings differ from the central three relief sculptures in the workmanship of the carving and the facial types. These correspond to the conservative approach of woodcarvers from a local workshop in Cheb (the Master of the Madonna from the Stone Street), which was in operation there before the arrival of the Master of the Marian Altarpiece from Seeberg and which produced sculptures, for example, for the Church of St Nicholas in Cheb.

=== Other works (produced by the workshop or pupils) ===
- Madonna on a crescent moon (1520-1530), Gallery of Fine Arts in Cheb
- Madonna on a crescent moon (1520-1530), Vicariate in Františkovy Lázně
- St Margaret, St Barbara, a Holy Bishop (National Gallery in Prague), a Holy Bishop (private collection), part of the altarpiece from 1520-1530
- Assumpta from Stupno, Gallery of West Bohemia in Plzeň

== Works by Hans Leinberger ==
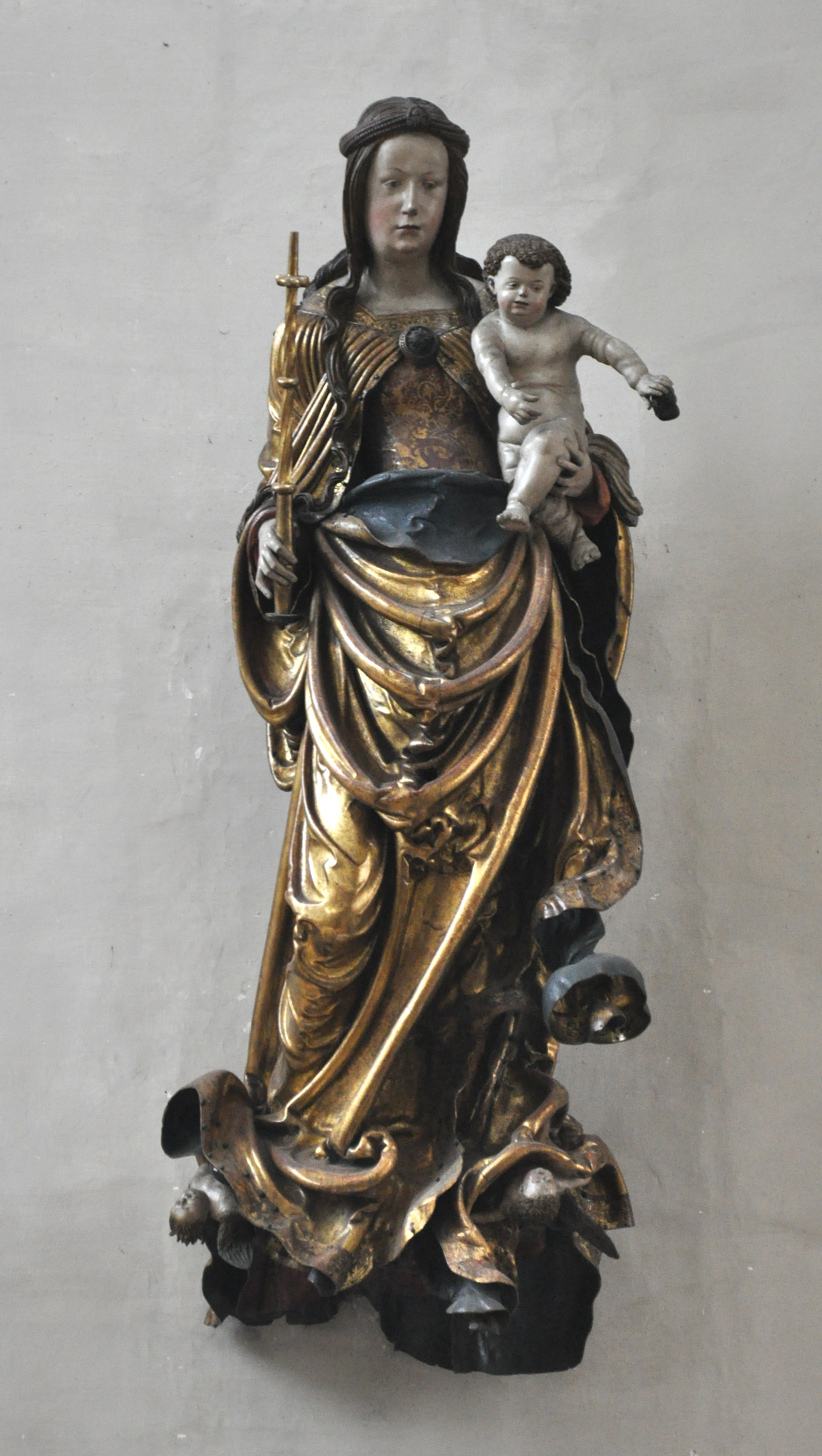
Hans Leinberger, Rosenkranzmadonna, Landshut

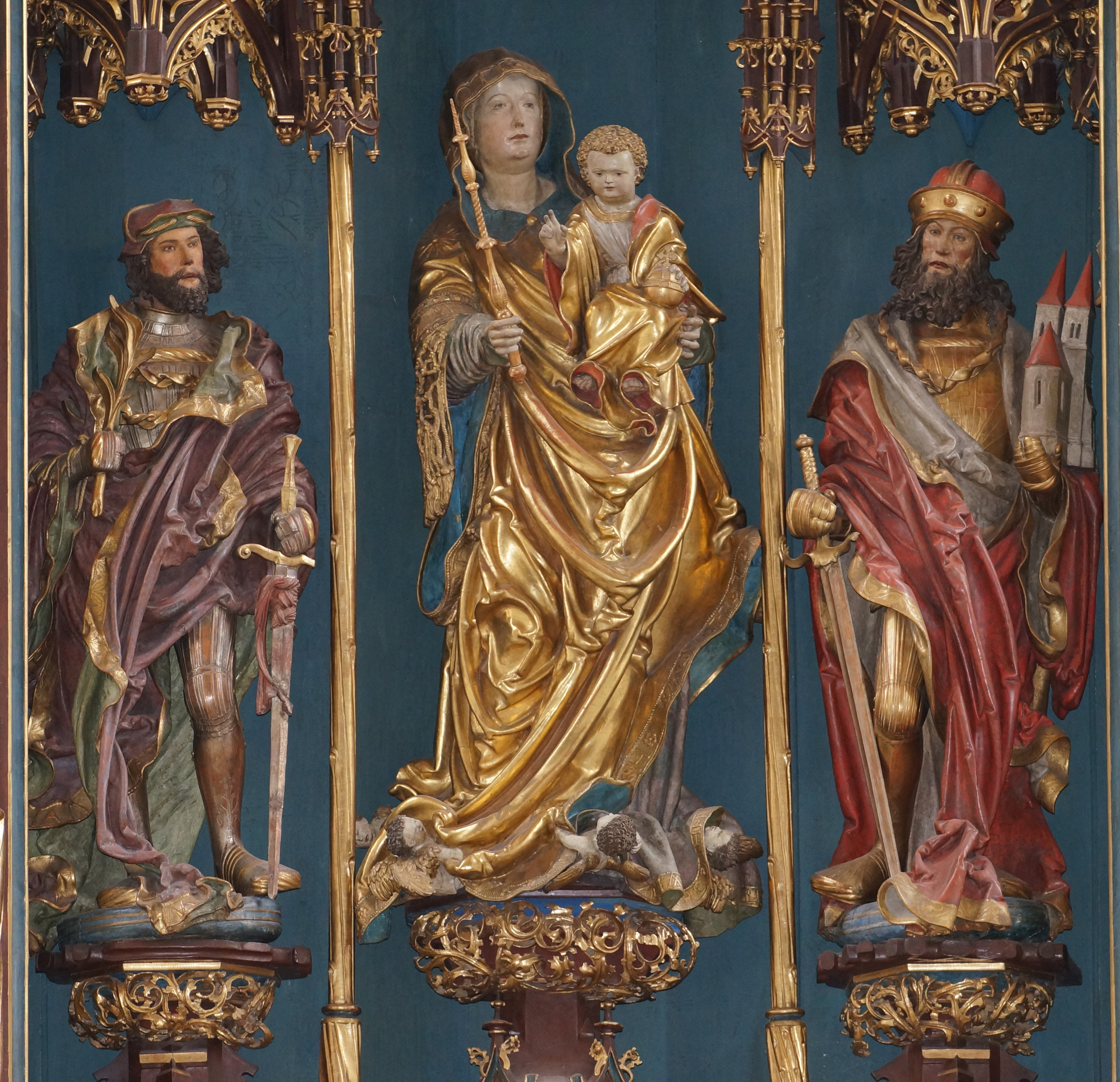
Hans Leinberger, Moosburg Altarpiece

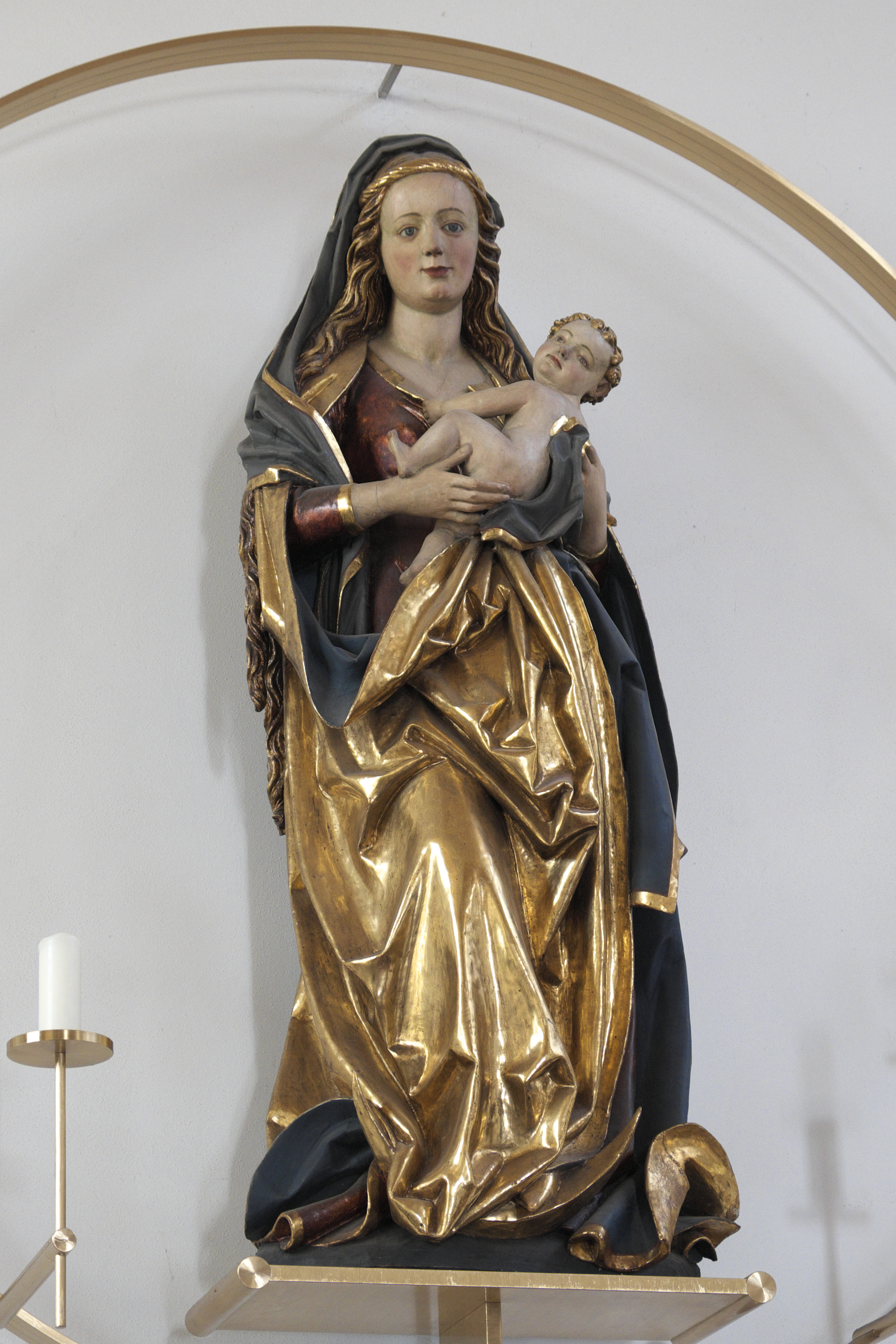
Hans Leinberger, Madonna, St. Jodok, Landshut

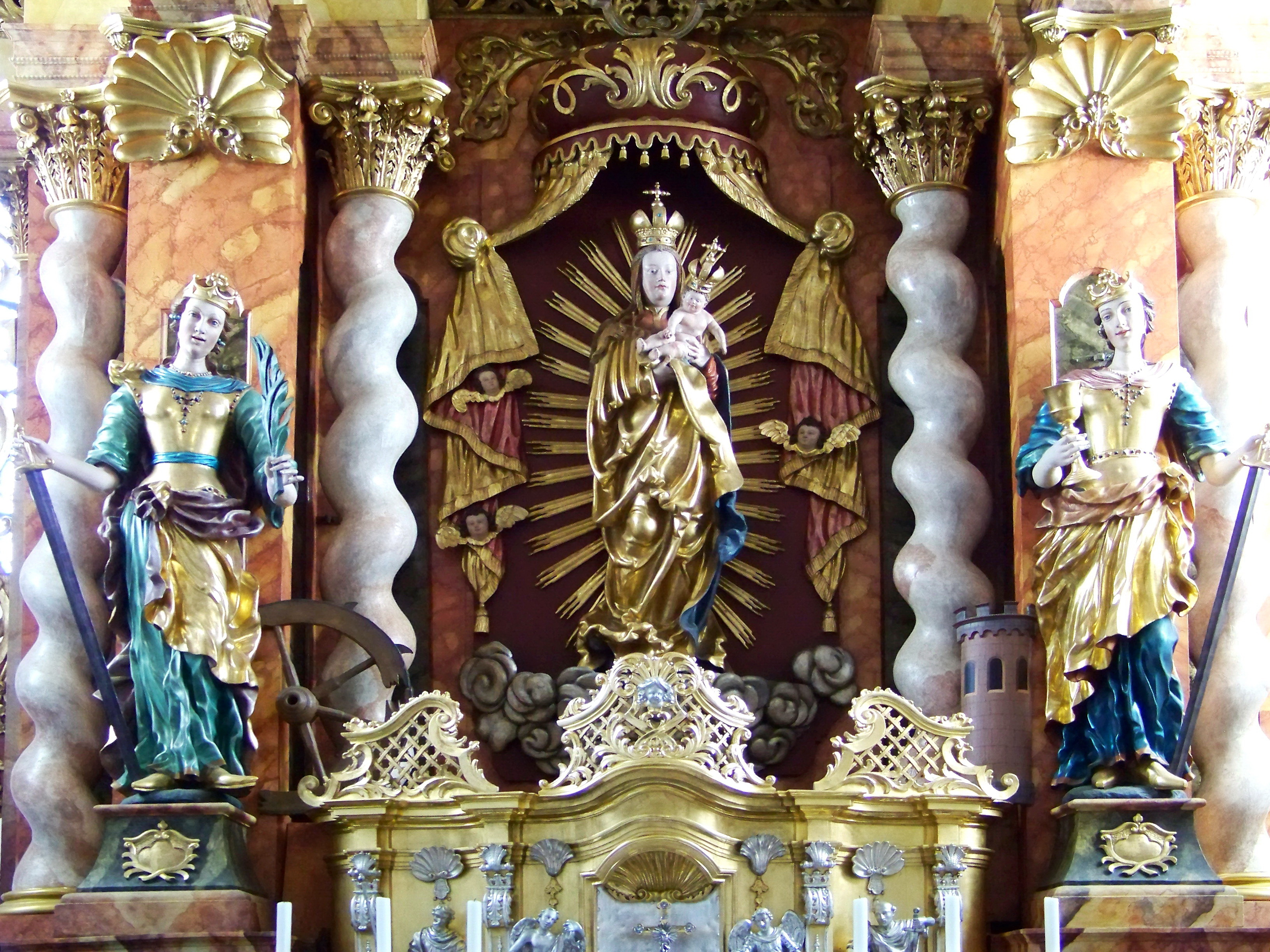
Hans Leinberger, Madonna, Furth Kirche Sankt Sebastian

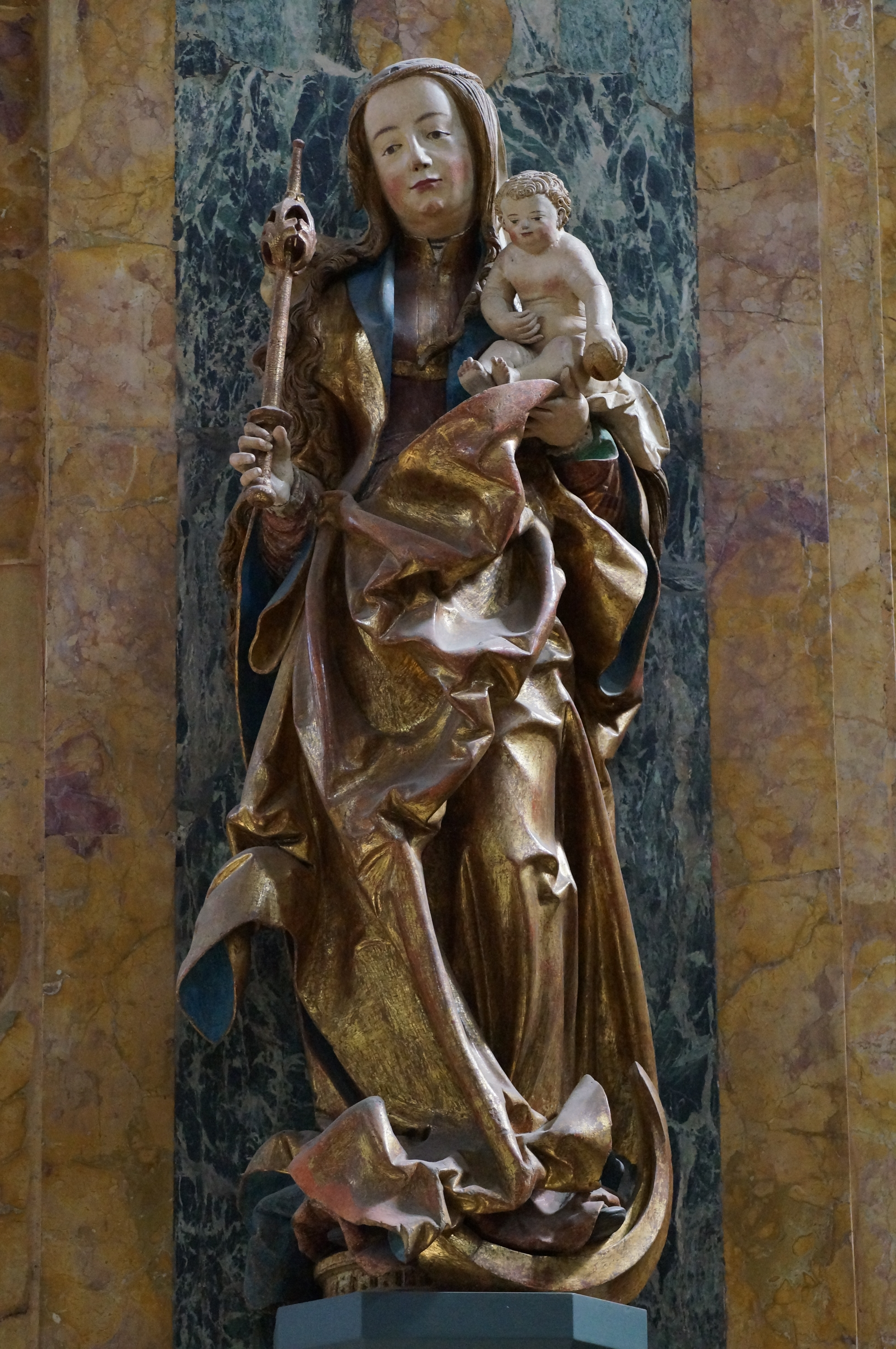
Hans Leinberger, Sichelmadonna, Brixen

== Sources ==
- Jiří Vykoukal (ed.), Umění gotiky na Chebsku, Galerie výtvarného umění v Chebu 2009, ISBN 978-80-85016-92-5
- Michaela Ottová, Mistr mariánského oltáře ze Seeberku, in: A. Mudra, M. Ottová (eds.), Ars vivendi. Professori Jaromír Homolka ad honorem, Opera FTC UCP, Historia et historia artium, vol. V, Praha 2006, pp. 327-349
- Jana Ševčíková, Chebská gotická plastika, Galerie výtvarného umění v Chebu 1975
