= Cheb =

- Town
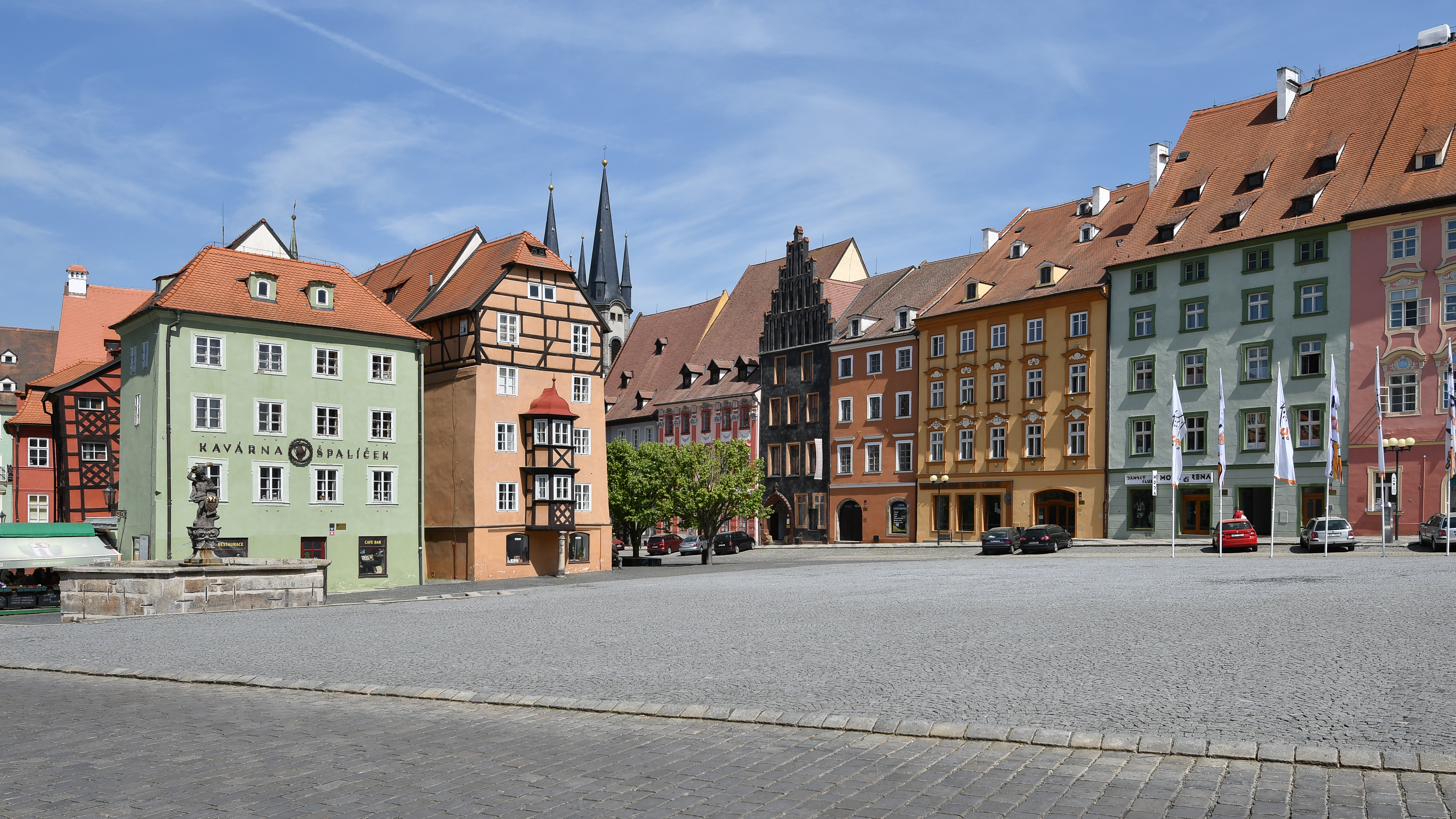
- The square Náměstí Krále Jiřího z Poděbrad

- Flag Coat of arms Wordmark

- Location in the Czech Republic
- Coordinates: 50°4′46″N 12°22′14″E
- Country: Czech Republic
- Region: Karlovy Vary
- District: Cheb
- First mentioned: 1061

Government
  - Mayor: Jan Vrba (ANO)

Area
  - Total: 96.36 km^{2} (37.20 sq mi)
- Elevation: 459 m (1,506 ft)

Population (2026-01-01)
  - Total: 32,892
  - Density: 341.3/km^{2} (884.1/sq mi)
- Time zone: UTC+1 (CET)
  - Summer (DST): UTC+2 (CEST)
- Postal code: 350 02
- Website: www.cheb.cz

Cheb (Czech pronunciation: [ˈxɛp]; German: Eger) is a town in the Karlovy Vary Region of the Czech Republic. It has about 33,000 inhabitants. The town is located on the Ohře River.

Before the expulsion of Germans in 1945, the town was the centre of the German-speaking region known as Egerland. The historic town centre is well preserved and is protected as an urban monument reservation. The most important monument is the Cheb Castle, protected as a national cultural monument.

== Administrative division ==
Cheb consists of 19 municipal parts (in brackets population according to the 2021 census):

- Cheb (26,768)
- Bříza (47)
- Cetnov (104)
- Chvoječná (28)
- Dolní Dvory (49)
- Dřenice (50)
- Háje (1,082)
- Horní Dvory (57)
- Hradiště (206)
- Hrozňatov (209)
- Jindřichov (86)
- Klest (41)
- Loužek (23)
- Pelhřimov (95)
- Podhoří (142)
- Podhrad (665)
- Skalka (228)
- Střížov (172)
- Tršnice (109)

== Etymology ==
The first name of the town, documented in 1061, was Egire. It was a Latin name, which was derived from the Celtic name of the Ohře River Agara. The German name Eger was then derived from the Latin name.

The Czech name Cheb first appeared in the mid-14th century. The name is derived from the Old Czech word heb (modern Czech oheb, ohyb), which means 'bend'. It is related to bends of the Ohře River.

== Geography ==
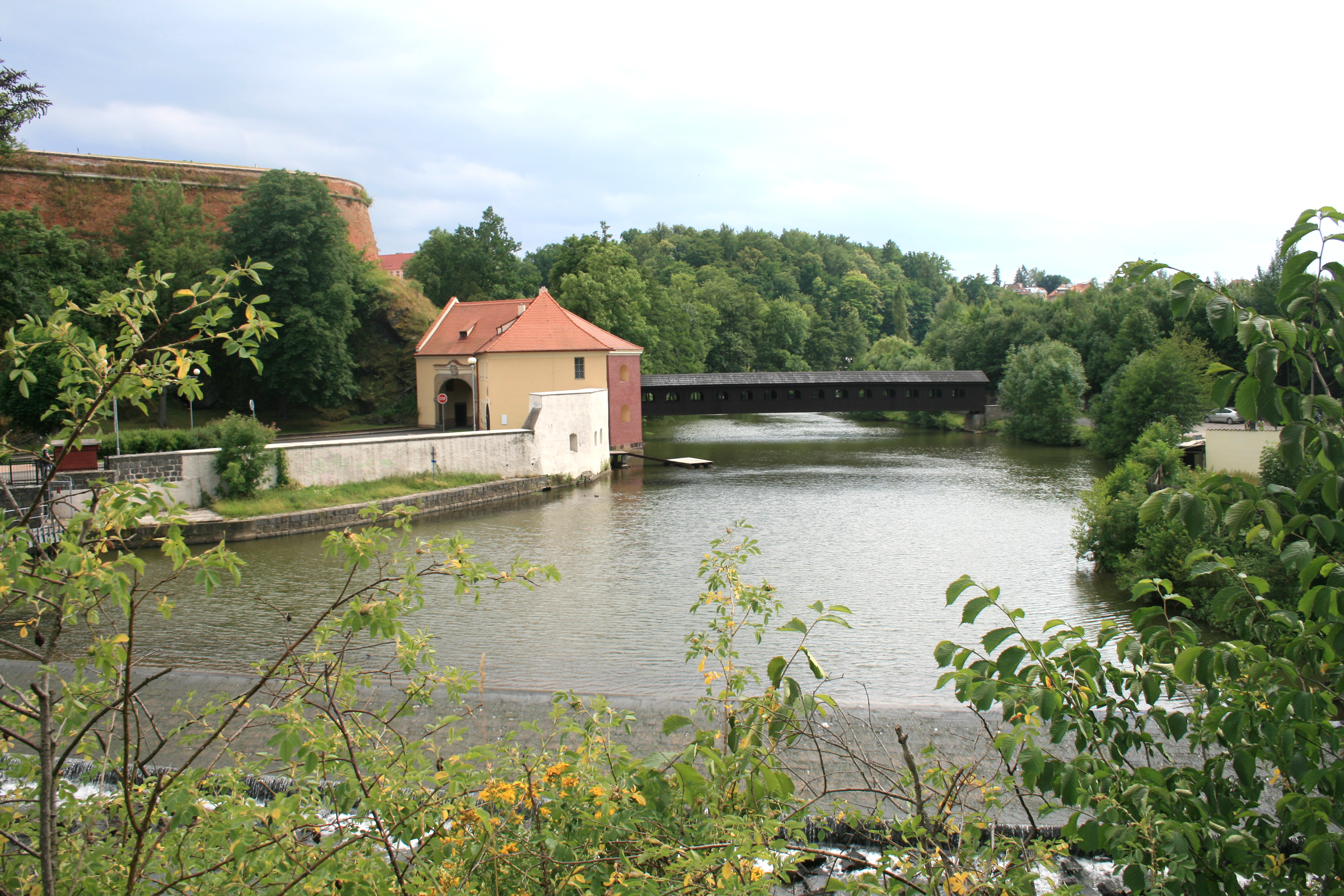
Wooden bridge over the Ohře River

Cheb is located about 38 kilometres (24 mi) southwest of Karlovy Vary, on the border with Germany. The northern and western parts of the municipal territory lie in the Fichtel Mountains. The rest of the territory lies in the Cheb Basin, named after the town. The highest point is the hill Zelená hora at 637 m (2,090 ft) above sea level.

The Ohře River flows through the town. There are two large reservoirs in the municipal territory: Skalka (northeast of the town and supplied by the Ohře) and Jesenice (southeast of the town and supplied by the Wondreb). There are also several small fishponds, especially in the southern part of the municipal territory.

=== Climate ===
Cheb has a humid continental climate (Köppen: Dfb; Trewartha: Dclo), with average temperatures in January and February below freezing and an average temperature of 0.0 °C (32.0 °F) in December. The average summer temperature is around 17.3 °C (63.1 °F), and it is not uncommon to see days with temperatures above 30.0 °C (86.0 °F). The town enters spring in late April and winter in early October.

Climate data for Cheb (1991–2020 normals, extremes 1864–present)
| Month | Jan | Feb | Mar | Apr | May | Jun | Jul | Aug | Sep | Oct | Nov | Dec | Year |
|---|---|---|---|---|---|---|---|---|---|---|---|---|---|
| Record high °C (°F) | 14.6 (58.3) | 17.4 (63.3) | 22.6 (72.7) | 28.8 (83.8) | 32.8 (91.0) | 36.2 (97.2) | 38.1 (100.6) | 36.9 (98.4) | 33.2 (91.8) | 26.1 (79.0) | 17.5 (63.5) | 14.6 (58.3) | 38.1 (100.6) |
| Mean daily maximum °C (°F) | 1.6 (34.9) | 3.5 (38.3) | 8.3 (46.9) | 14.2 (57.6) | 18.7 (65.7) | 22.0 (71.6) | 24.1 (75.4) | 24.0 (75.2) | 18.7 (65.7) | 12.6 (54.7) | 6.0 (42.8) | 2.0 (35.6) | 13.0 (55.4) |
| Daily mean °C (°F) | −1.0 (30.2) | −0.2 (31.6) | 3.5 (38.3) | 8.3 (46.9) | 12.8 (55.0) | 16.2 (61.2) | 17.9 (64.2) | 17.4 (63.3) | 12.8 (55.0) | 8.1 (46.6) | 3.4 (38.1) | 0.0 (32.0) | 8.3 (46.9) |
| Mean daily minimum °C (°F) | −3.6 (25.5) | −3.4 (25.9) | −0.4 (31.3) | 2.9 (37.2) | 7.0 (44.6) | 10.4 (50.7) | 12.1 (53.8) | 11.8 (53.2) | 8.2 (46.8) | 4.6 (40.3) | 0.9 (33.6) | −2.2 (28.0) | 4.0 (39.2) |
| Record low °C (°F) | −24.6 (−12.3) | −28.4 (−19.1) | −21.5 (−6.7) | −8.6 (16.5) | −4.1 (24.6) | −0.6 (30.9) | 2.2 (36.0) | 0.7 (33.3) | −2.6 (27.3) | −9.2 (15.4) | −17.7 (0.1) | −25.9 (−14.6) | −28.4 (−19.1) |
| Average precipitation mm (inches) | 41.9 (1.65) | 31.0 (1.22) | 37.9 (1.49) | 33.6 (1.32) | 56.9 (2.24) | 70.5 (2.78) | 76.8 (3.02) | 69.5 (2.74) | 53.8 (2.12) | 46.1 (1.81) | 44.0 (1.73) | 46.9 (1.85) | 609.0 (23.98) |
| Average snowfall cm (inches) | 20.9 (8.2) | 15.9 (6.3) | 7.9 (3.1) | 1.2 (0.5) | 0.0 (0.0) | 0.0 (0.0) | 0.0 (0.0) | 0.0 (0.0) | 0.0 (0.0) | 0.5 (0.2) | 6.9 (2.7) | 16.0 (6.3) | 69.4 (27.3) |
| Average precipitation days (≥ 1.0 mm) | 10.2 | 8.0 | 9.3 | 7.7 | 9.5 | 9.5 | 10.8 | 9.4 | 8.1 | 9.3 | 9.2 | 10.2 | 111.4 |
| Average relative humidity (%) | 85.8 | 81.4 | 75.8 | 68.4 | 68.1 | 68.6 | 68.4 | 70.6 | 78.0 | 83.5 | 88.0 | 88.2 | 77.1 |
| Average dew point °C (°F) | −4.5 (23.9) | −3.7 (25.3) | −1.3 (29.7) | 1.6 (34.9) | 6.0 (42.8) | 9.4 (48.9) | 10.8 (51.4) | 10.8 (51.4) | 8.6 (47.5) | 4.8 (40.6) | 0.3 (32.5) | −2.9 (26.8) | 3.3 (38.0) |
| Mean monthly sunshine hours | 43.8 | 74.3 | 118.1 | 177.3 | 206.7 | 212.2 | 224.6 | 214.1 | 149.1 | 96.1 | 39.0 | 32.6 | 1,587.8 |
Source 1: NOAA (dew point 1961–1990)
Source 2: Czech Hydrometeorological Institute (extremes)

== History ==
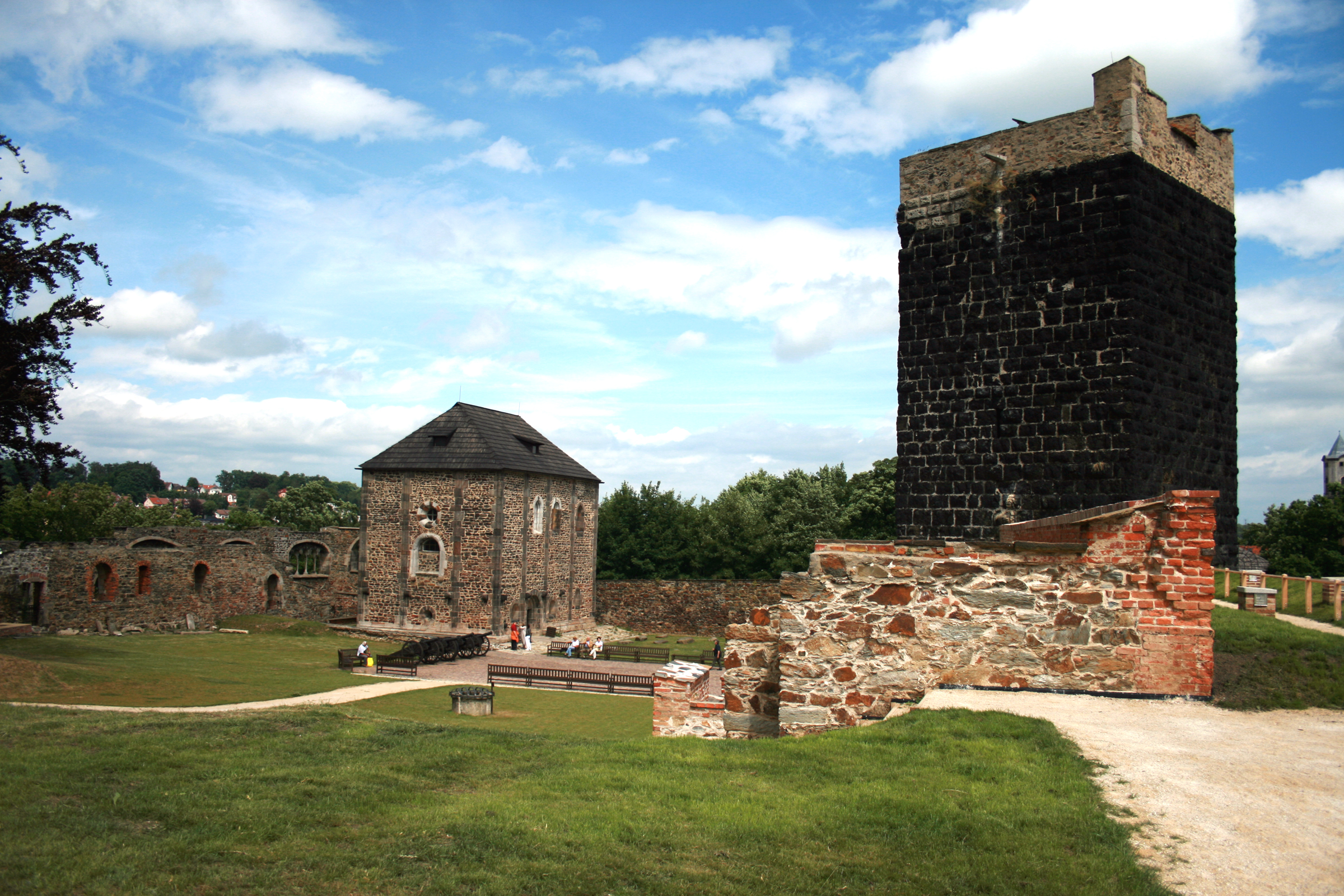
Cheb Castle with the Black Tower

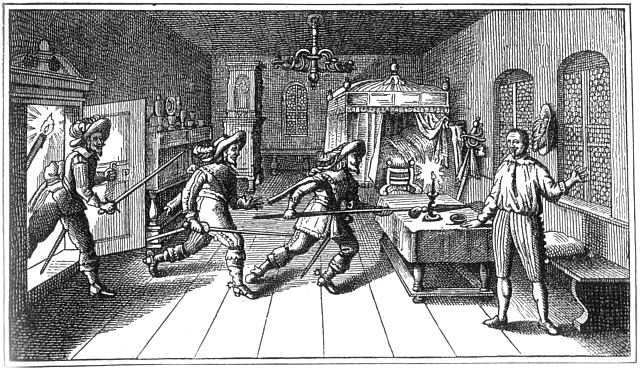
Killing of Albrecht von Wallenstein

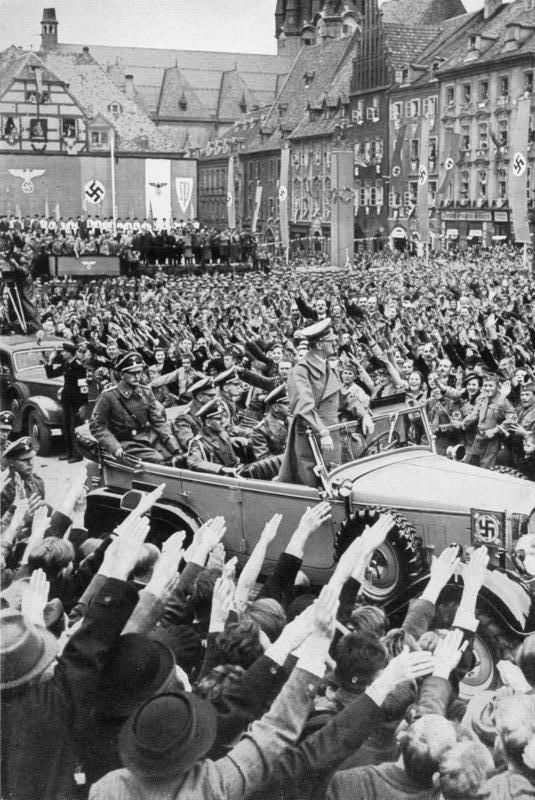
Adolf Hitler driving through the crowd in Cheb on 3 October 1938

The earliest settlement in the area was a Slavic gord at what is now known as the Cheb Castle complex, north of the town centre. In 807 the district of today's Cheb was included in the new margraviate of East Franconia, which belonged at first to the Babenbergs, but from 906 to the margraves (marquis) of Vohburg.

The first written mention of Cheb is from 1061. Děpolt II founded the castle on the site of the gord around 1125. In 1149, Cheb was described as a fortified marketplace. Emperor Frederick Barbarossa acquired Cheb in 1167. In 1203, it was first referred to as a town. It became the centre of a historical region called Egerland.

From 1266 to 1276, the town was property of King Ottokar II of Bohemia. The historic town centre was established after the fire in 1270. King Wenceslaus II of Bohemia held the town in 1291–1304, then Albert I of Germany acquired the region. It was not until 1322 that Cheb became a permanent part of the Lands of the Bohemian Crown, when King John of Bohemia acquired it from Emperor Louis IV. The later local history was marked by continued resistance against incorporation into Bohemia.

On 5 May 1389, during a Reichstag between King Wenceslaus IV and a group of Imperial Free Cities of southwest Germany, the Treaty of Eger was agreed upon, after Wenceslaus had failed to secure his interests in the town. In the 15th century, Cheb was one of the largest and wealthiest towns of Kingdom of Bohemia with 7,300 inhabitants.

The town suffered severely during the Hussite Wars, during the Swedish invasion in the Thirty Years' War in 1631 and 1647, and in the War of the Austrian Succession in 1742. In 1634, during the Thirty Years' War, Albrecht von Wallenstein was killed here. In 1723, Cheb became a free royal town. The northern part of the old town was devastated by a large fire in 1809, and many middle-age buildings were destroyed.

In 1757, the town's financial self-government was abolished for the sake of Austrian centralisation. In 1848, the citizen's council demanded separation from Bohemia and reconstitution of its Landtag.

The terms of the 1919 Treaty of Saint-Germain-en-Laye triggered civil unrest between the Sudeten German population and the new First Czechoslovak Republic, just as in the rest of the Sudetenland. In the interwar period, many ethnic Czechs came to the town with the boom of industry.

During the Sudeten Crisis, the town was occupied by the Nazi German-sponsored Sudetendeutsches Freikorps paramilitary group. On 3 October 1938, the town was visited by Adolf Hitler; shortly afterward Wehrmacht troops marched into the Sudetenland and seized control. From 1938 until 1945, the town was annexed to Germany and was administered as part of the Reichsgau Sudetenland. The Gestapo and Ordnungspolizei operated a prison in Cheb, whose prisoners were subjected to forced labour. Cheb was liberated by the 97th Infantry Division of the United States Army on 25 April 1945.

After the end of World War II the region was returned to Czechoslovakia. Under the Beneš decrees and Potsdam Agreement of the same year, the German-speaking majority was expelled.

== Demographics ==
In 1910, only 0.5% of the population were Czech. Until 1945, it was part of the Northern Bavarian dialect area. After World War II, due to the expulsion of ethnic Germans and resettlement of Czechs, the population significantly dropped.

Historical population

| Year | Pop. | ±% |
|---|---|---|
| 1869 | 17,826 | — |
| 1880 | 21,575 | +21.0% |
| 1890 | 22,875 | +6.0% |
| 1900 | 28,084 | +22.8% |
| 1910 | 31,761 | +13.1% |

| Year | Pop. | ±% |
|---|---|---|
| 1921 | 32,735 | +3.1% |
| 1930 | 37,599 | +14.9% |
| 1950 | 20,178 | −46.3% |
| 1961 | 22,133 | +9.7% |
| 1970 | 26,650 | +20.4% |

| Year | Pop. | ±% |
|---|---|---|
| 1980 | 30,883 | +15.9% |
| 1991 | 31,847 | +3.1% |
| 2001 | 32,893 | +3.3% |
| 2011 | 32,401 | −1.5% |
| 2021 | 30,161 | −6.9% |

Source: Censuses

The population includes a large group of Vietnamese people. Their families were invited to the country as guest workers during the Communist era.

== Economy ==
The pillars of Cheb's economy are mainly services and tourism, and there are no large companies here. The largest employers are the Town of Cheb and Autodoc Logistics Czech (car parts and accessories dealer). The largest industrial enterprise is Tritia, a bakery with more than 200 employees. Other notable industrial companies include Nexans Power Accessories Czech Republic (manufacturer of components for conductors) and Playmobil CZ (toys manufacturer).

Many entrepreneurs and small traders come from the large Vietnamese community. After the Velvet Revolution in 1989, the Vietnamese community gradually established seven markets here, and even customers from Germany came to Cheb for cheap goods. Today, three Vietnamese markets operate here.

== Transport ==
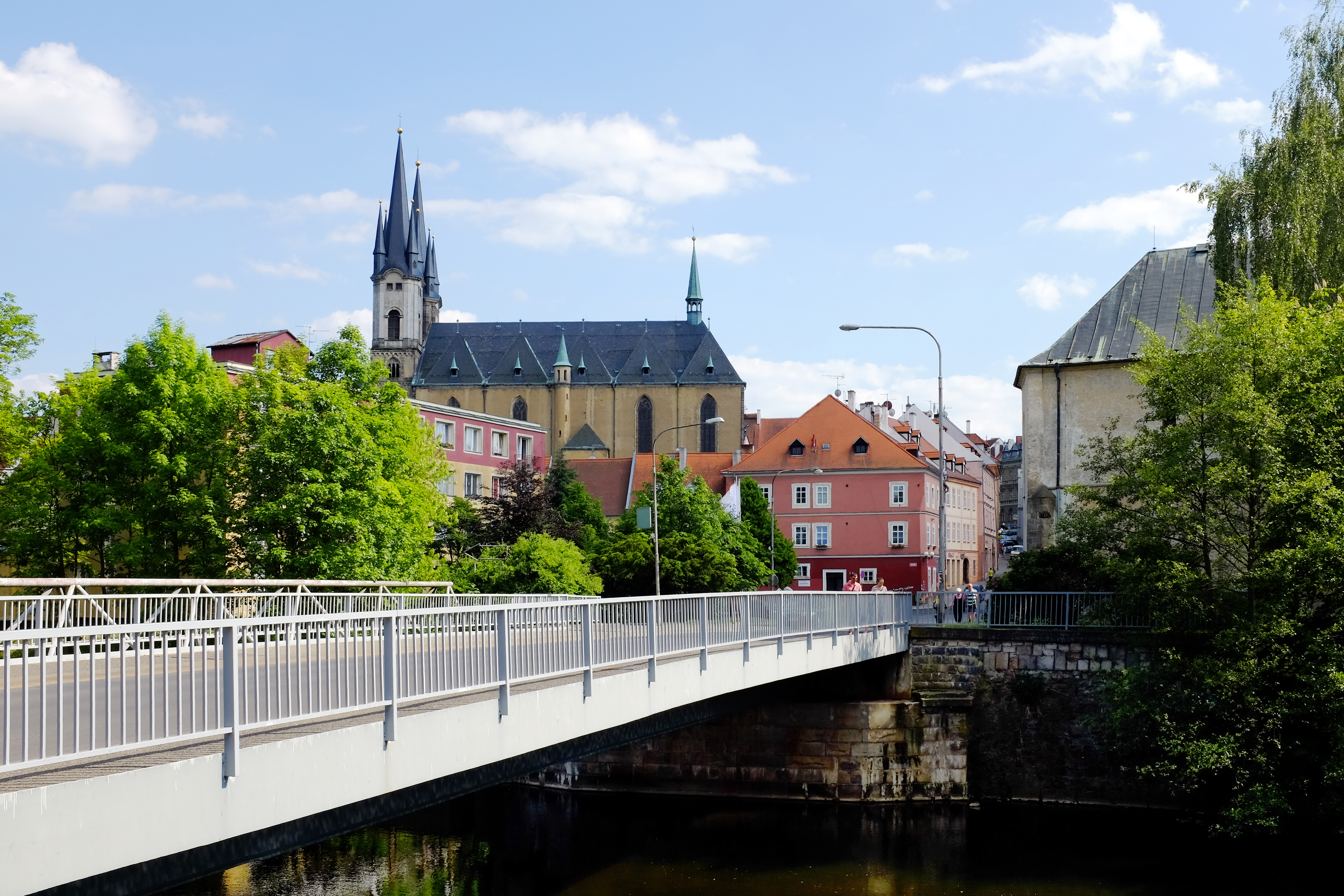
Bridge over the Ohře

The D6 motorway from Prague to Karlovy Vary and Cheb (part of the European routes E48 and E49) forks in Cheb and continues to the Czech–German border to the west (as E48) and to the north (as E49).

Cheb is an important railway junction. The town lies on the railway line of national importance from Františkovy Lázně to Plzeň, Prague, Olomouc and Ostrava. Other railway lines that pass through the town are Prague–Chomutov–Cheb, Nuremberg–Cheb, Hof–Marktredwitz, Zwickau–Cheb and Cheb–Luby. In addition to the main railway station, the town is also served by the Cheb-Skalka station.

Cheb Airport is located 3 kilometres (2 mi) east of the town centre. It is the second-oldest airport in the country and the oldest still existing.

== Culture ==
Cheb is home to the Gallery of Fine Arts in Cheb.

== Education ==
Cheb is known for its Cheb Violin Making School.

Two faculties of the University of West Bohemia, pedagogical and economic, have a detached workplace in Cheb and open study programs there.

== Sport ==
The town is represented by the football club FK Hvězda Cheb. It plays in the 4th tier of the Czech football system. Its predecessor was the club FC Union Cheb, which played in the Czechoslovak and Czech First League from 1979 to 1996, but then was abolished due to financial reasons. The team play at the Lokomotiva Stadium, located on street U Stadionu.

The Lokomotiva Stadium once held motorcycle speedway and hosted a final round of the Czechoslovak Individual Speedway Championship for three consecutive years from 1966 to 1968.

== Sights ==
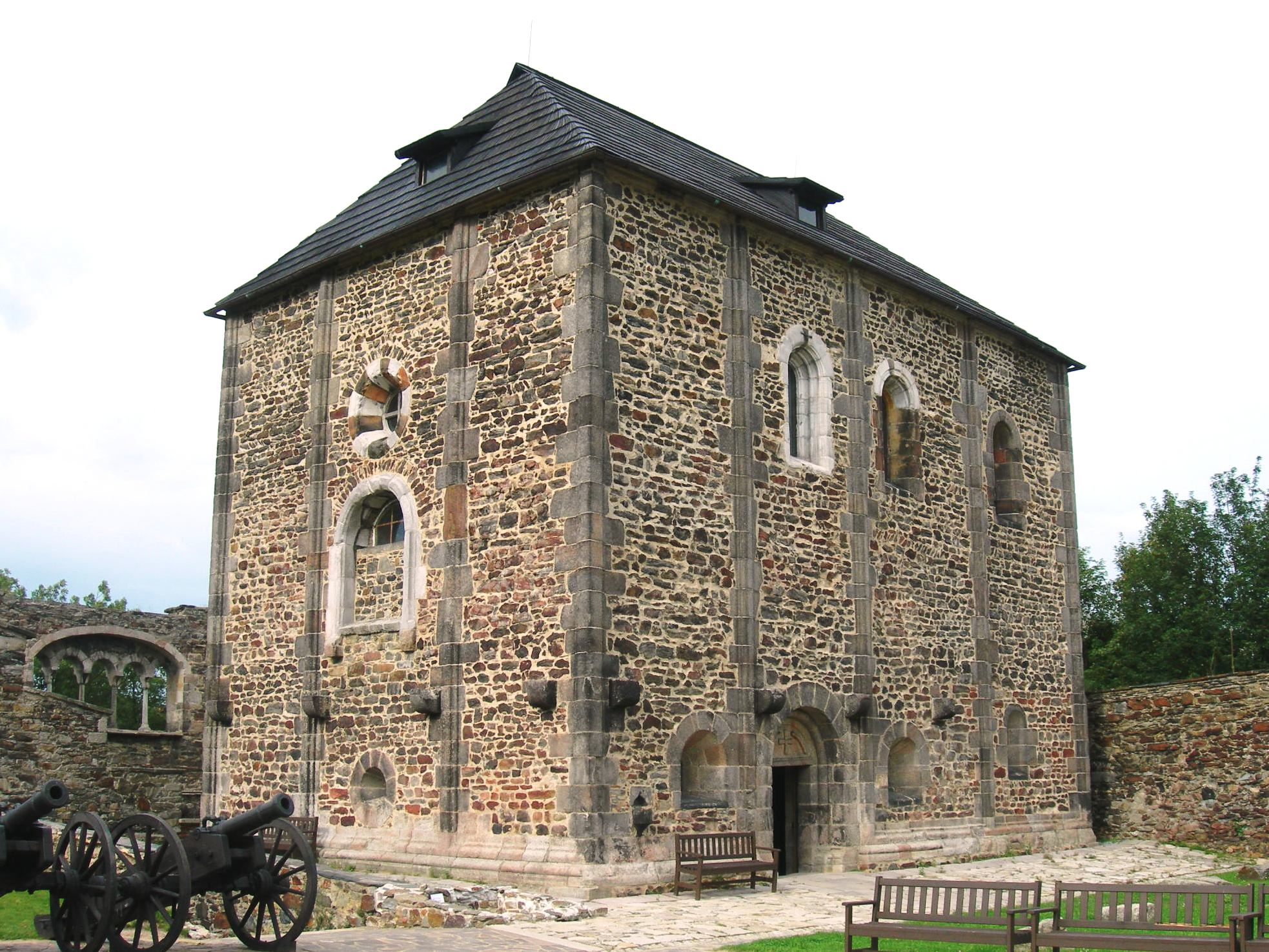
Chapel of Saints Martin, Erhard and Ursula

=== Cheb Castle ===
On the rock in the northwest of the historic town centre lies Cheb Castle. It was founded around 1125 and was rebuilt into a Kaiserpfalz at the end of the 12th century. It is the only example of a Kaiserpfalz in the Czech Republic. At the turn of the 17th and 18th centuries, the castle was partially rebuilt into a Baroque fortress citadel. Although the castle is mostly a ruin, the torso of the palace, the defensive Black Tower and the Chapel of Saints Martin Erhard and Ursula survived to this day.

The Chapel of Saints Martin, Erhard and Ursula is a unique Romanesque-Gothic double chapel. It is the best preserved example of the Hohenstaufen architecture in Central Europe. The chapel has two storeys; the lower storey is in Romanesque style, while the upper storey is Gothic. On the first floor, there are original capitals of marble columns, decorated with figurative scenes of angels with Bibles as well as lewd scenes.

For its value, the castle complex is protected as a national cultural monument. It is open to the public and offers guided tours.

=== Town square ===
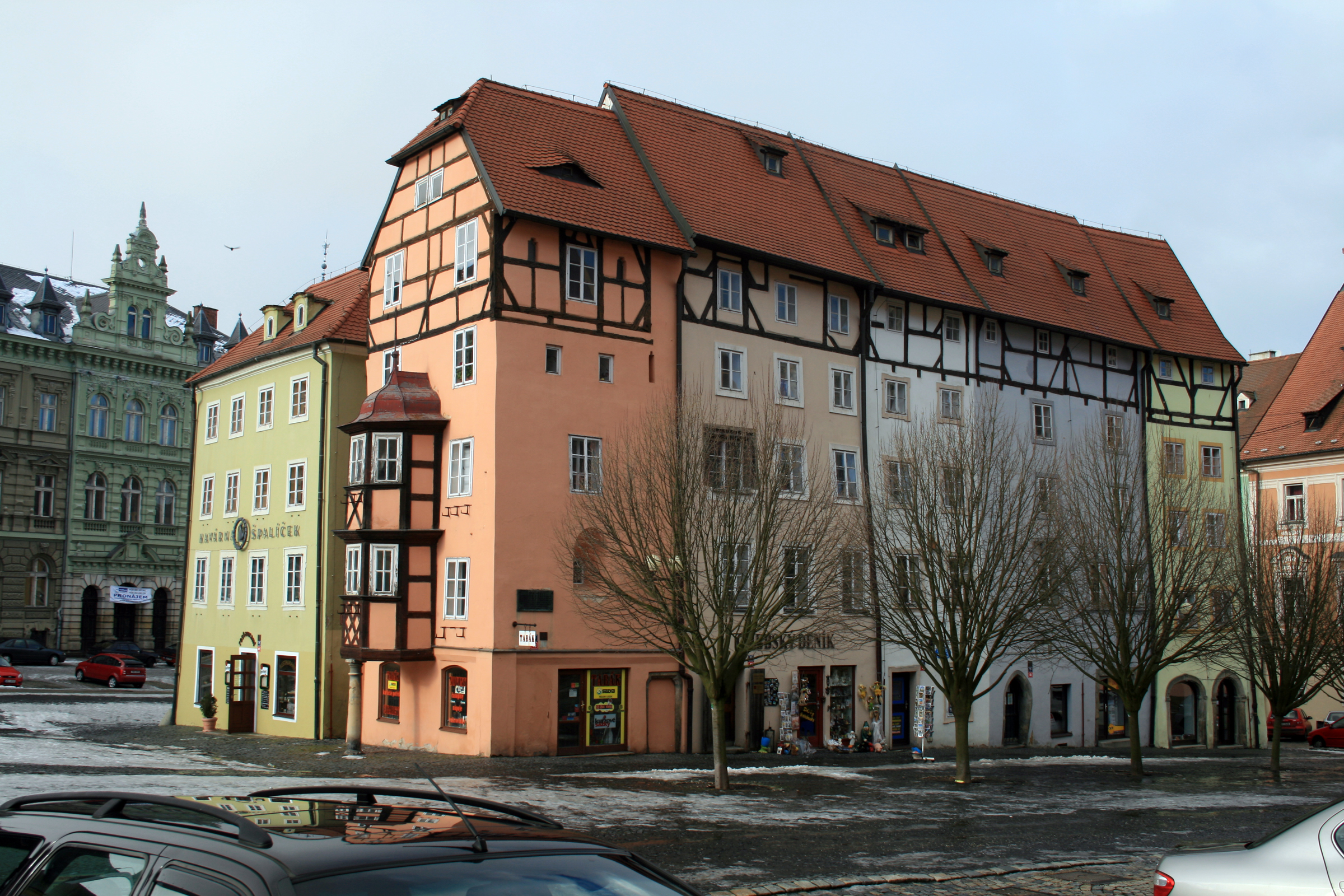
Špalíček

In the centre of the historic town centre is the square Náměstí Krále Jiřího z Poděbrad. One of the symbols of the Cheb architecture is a group of houses known as Špalíček. It is located in the middle of the town square and dates from the 13th century. The bizarre complex of eleven houses consists of narrow, four and five-storey houses without a courtyard, divided by a 1.6 metres (5.2 ft) wide alley. They are mostly in the late Gothic style. The outline of the two blocks can still be seen on the oldest existing records of 1472.

The most valuable burgher house on the town square is the Schirdinger House. It is a Gothic house, built at the beginning of the 13th century and restored after the fire in the 15th century. The Renaissance reconstruction took place in 1622–1626. Today it houses a gallery and a café.

Among the other valuable houses on the town square is the Town House, also known as Pachelbel's House or Juncker House. The house was first mentioned already in the 14th century. On 24 February 1634, Albrecht von Wallenstein was murdered here. Since 1873, the house serves as the town museum. The museum was later expanded to the neighbouring house.

The Grüner House on the town square is a Gothic-Baroque house. It belonged to the well-known Wrendl family from 1591 until 1876, whose family coat of arms is above the entrance. When the house was owned by magistrate councillor Grüner in the first half of the 19th century, Johann Wolfgang von Goethe frequently spent time here.

=== Sacral monuments ===
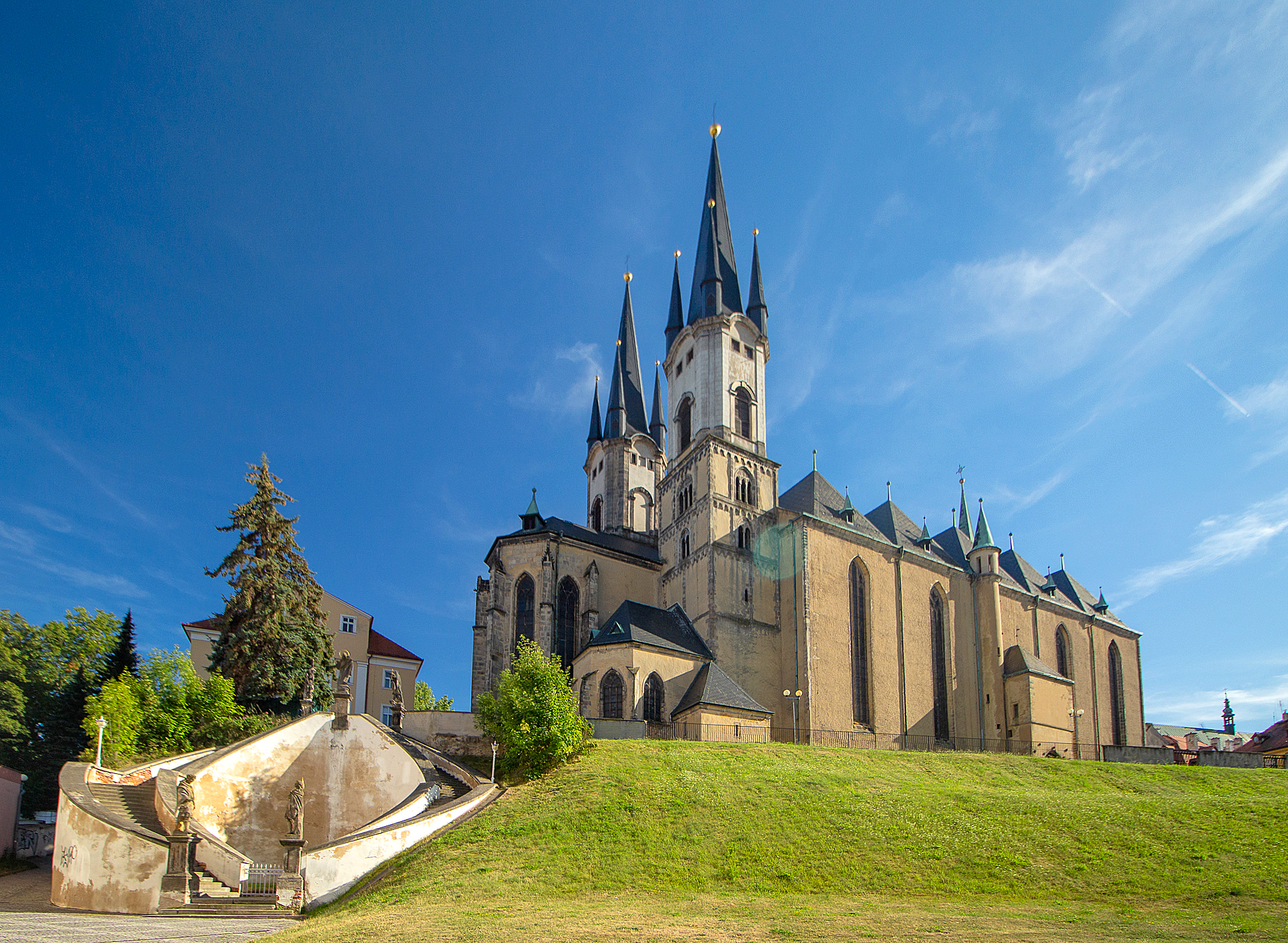
Church of Saints Nicholas and Elisabeth

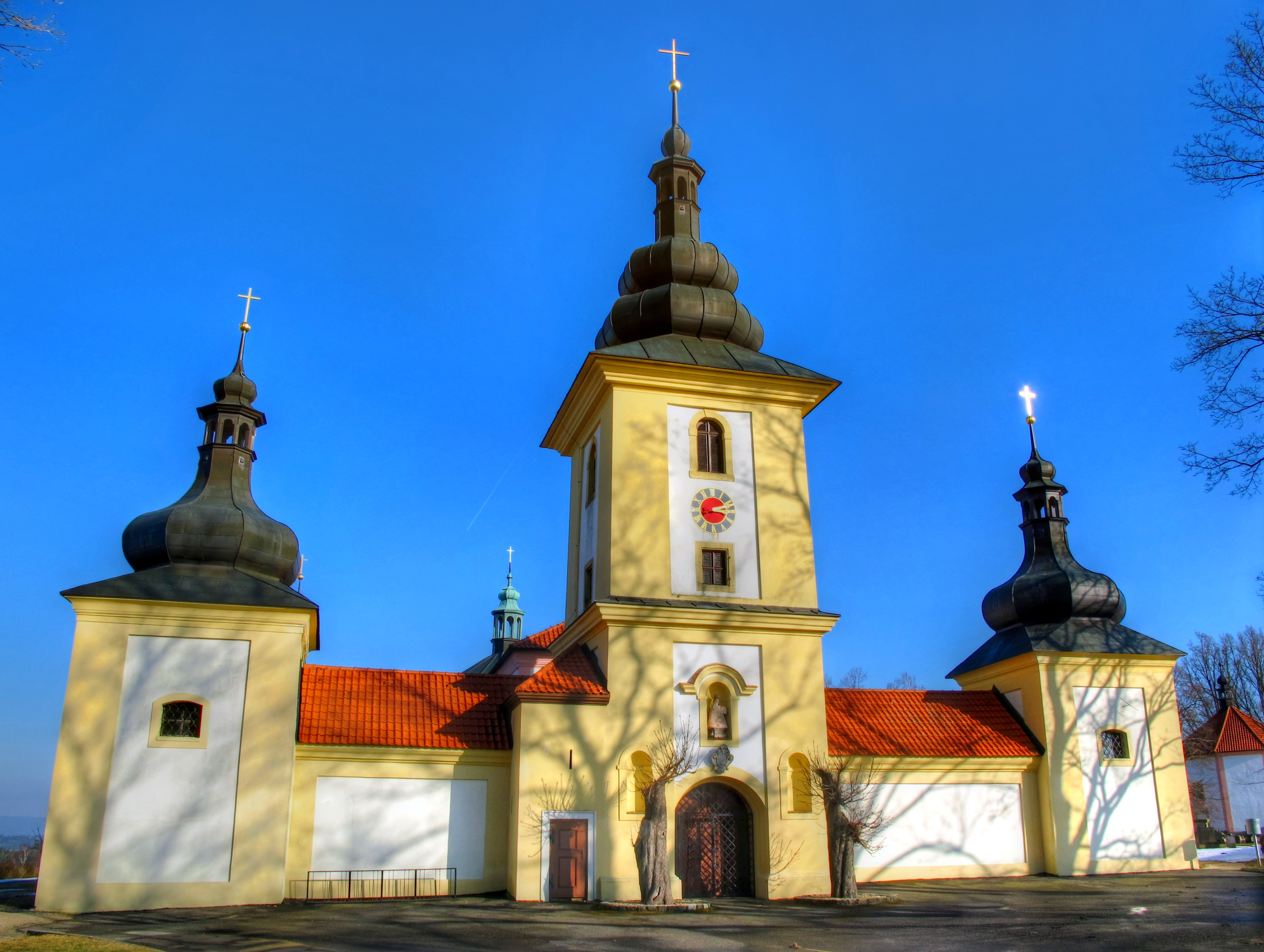
Maria Loreto

The Church of Saints Nicholas and Elisabeth is the main church of the town and the oldest late Gothic building. It was established as a three-naved Romanesque basilica in the 1220s, of which the western portal and the lower part of the tower remain in place. After the fire in 1270, it was rebuilt in the Gothic style, another reconstruction took place in the 1470s. After the fire of 1742, the tower was rebuilt with a Baroque cupola, according to the design of the indigenous architect Balthasar Neumann. The top of the twin steeples were destroyed by bombardment at the end of World War II and restored in summer 2008. The church tower is open to the public as a lookout lower.

The Franciscan monastery with the Church of the Annunciation was founded in 1256 and rebuilt after the fire in 1270. The church is one of the oldest Gothic hall churches in the country. Today the former monastery is owned by the town and is used as the venue of occasional concerts. The monastery also includes publicly accessible monastery garden.

The monastery of the order of Poor Clares with the Church of Saint Clare was founded at the end of the 13th century next to the Franciscan monastery. In 1707–1709, it was demolished and built again according to the design of Christoph Dientzenhofer. The monastery was abolished in 1782 and the buildings served various purposes.

The Dominican monastery with the Church of Saint Wenceslaus was built in 1294–1296. The monastery was badly damaged and the church destroyed during the Thirty Years' War. The new Baroque church was built in 1674–1688. The monastery was dissolved in 1950. The church is still in use, the convent now serves cultural purposes.

The early Baroque pilgrimage complex Maria Loreto was founded in the village of Starý Hrozňatov (today just Hrozňatov). It was founded next to the Church of the Holy Spirit, which dates from 1557. It belongs to the most visited pilgrimage sites in the country. The complex was built in 1664 and extended in 1675–1683. The Stations of the Cross that leads to Maria Loreto was originally composed of twenty-nine stations.

== Notable people ==
- Johannes Widmann (c. 1460 – after 1498), German mathematician
- Johannes Sylvius Egranus (c. 1480–1553), German theologian, humanist and reformer
- Johann Habermann (1516–1590), German Lutheran theologian
- Albrecht von Wallenstein (1583–1634), military leader and statesman; died here
- Johann Georg Macasius (1617–1653), German medical doctor
- Paul Klein (1652–1717), Jesuit missionary, botanist and writer
- Balthasar Neumann (1687–1753), German architect and military artillery engineer
- Bernhard Adler (1753–1810), German-Czech medical doctor
- Adolf Tachezy (1814–1892), politician and businessman, mayor of Cheb in 1873–1882
- Josef Ulbrich (1843–1910), Austrian law expert
- Karl Hermann Wolf (1862–1941), German journalist and politician
- Albin Dötsch (1872–1922), Austrian politician
- Barbara Schack (1874–1958), Czech-German politician
- Hugo Zuckermann (1881–1914), Jewish-Austrian poet
- Hans Hermann Adler (1891–1956), German academic and journalist
- Rudolf Serkin (1903–1991), Czech-American pianist
- Adolf Scherbaum (1909–2000), Czech-German trumpeter
- Erich Riedl (1933–2018), German politician
- Neda Al-Hilali (1938–2025), American fiber artist and weaver
- Andrej Krob (born 1938), theatre director and screenwriter
- Peter Glotz (1939–2005), German politician and social scientist
- Norbert Singer (born 1939), German automotive engineer
- Daniela Kolářová (born 1946), actress
- Lloyd A. Simandl (born 1948 or 1950), Czech-Canadian film director and producer
- Mikoláš Chadima (born 1952), Czech musician
- Ladislav Jakl (born 1959), musician and journalist
- Jaromír Bosák (born 1965), sports commentator and journalist
- Ilona Csáková (born 1970), Czech singer
- Pavel Nedvěd (born 1972), footballer
- Martin Fenin (born 1987), footballer

== Twin towns – sister cities ==
Cheb is twinned with:

- Bắc Ninh, Vietnam
- Hof, Germany
- Nová Dubnica, Slovakia

Since the fall of the Iron Curtain, Cheb has also had cordial relationships with the neighbouring German towns of Waldsassen and Marktredwitz.

== Gallery ==
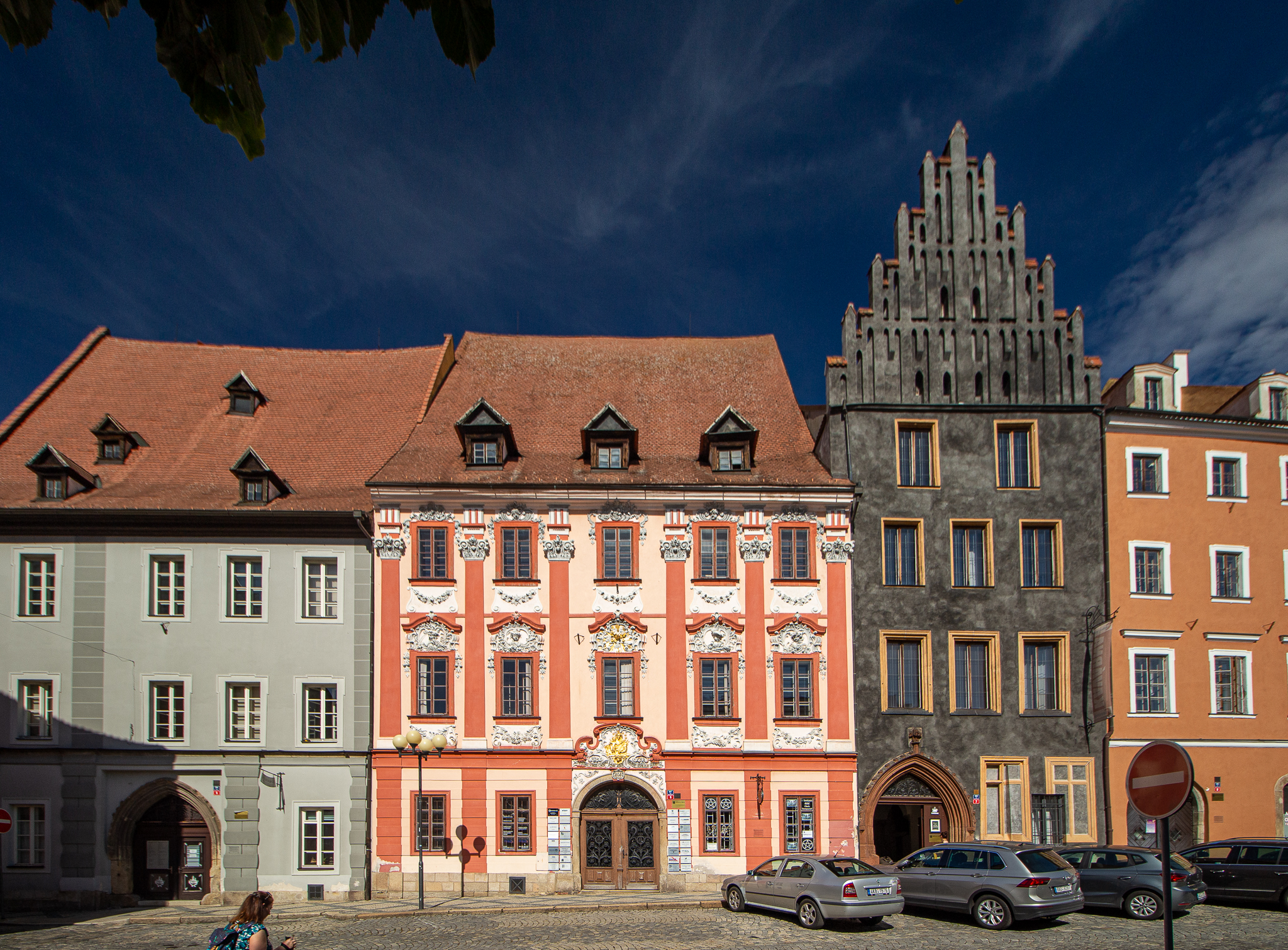
Historic houses on the town square

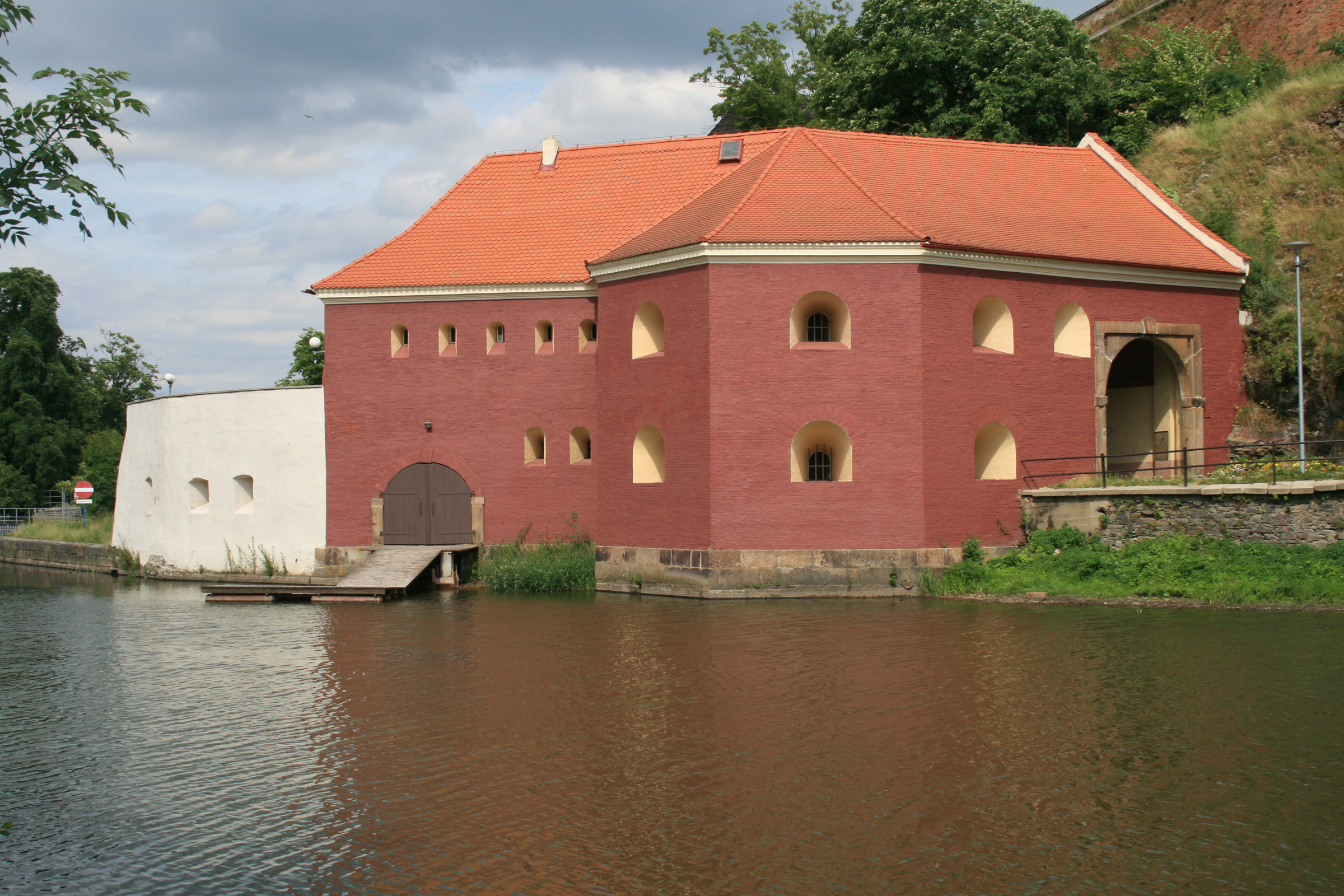
Sand Gate near the Ohře

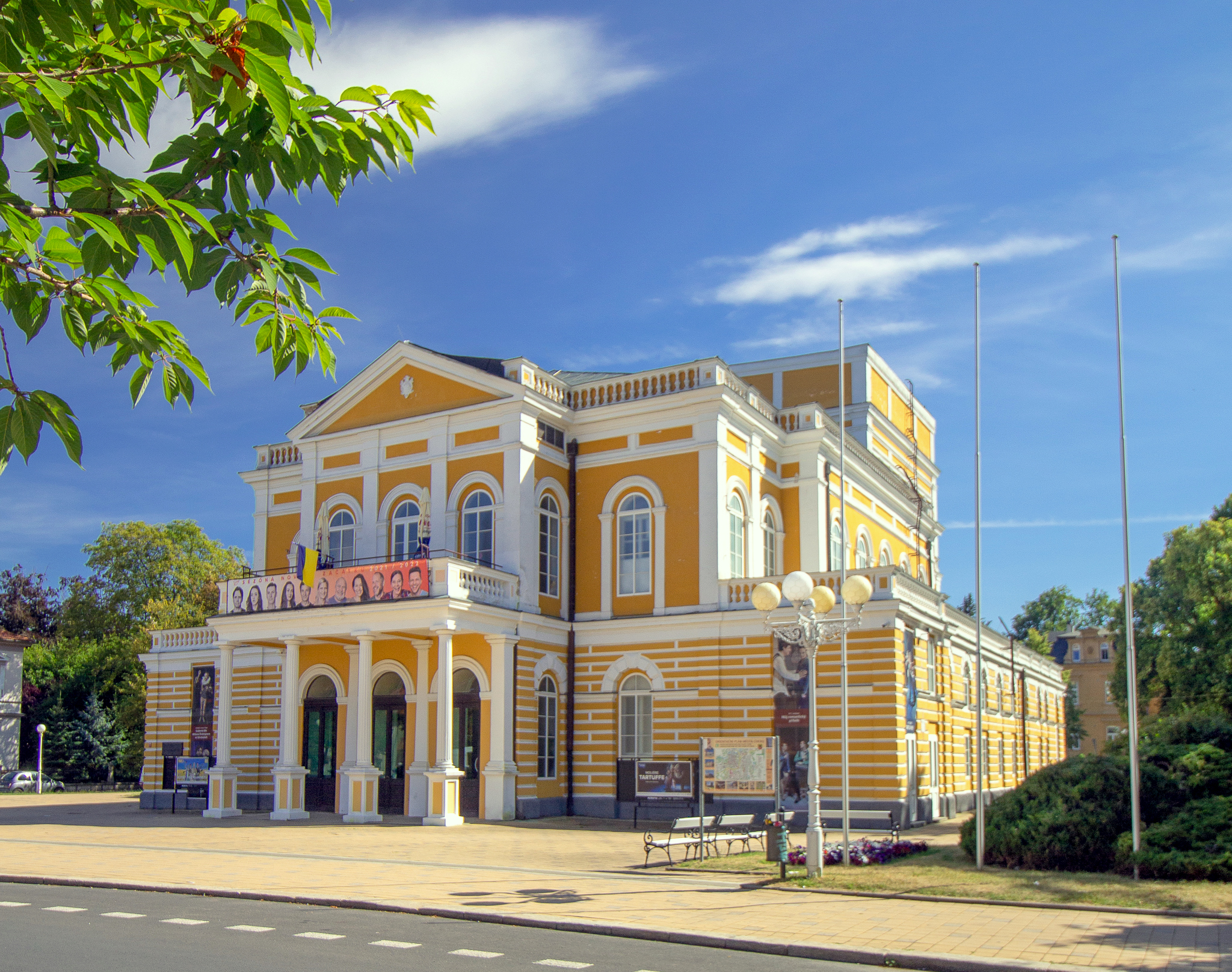
Cheb Theatre

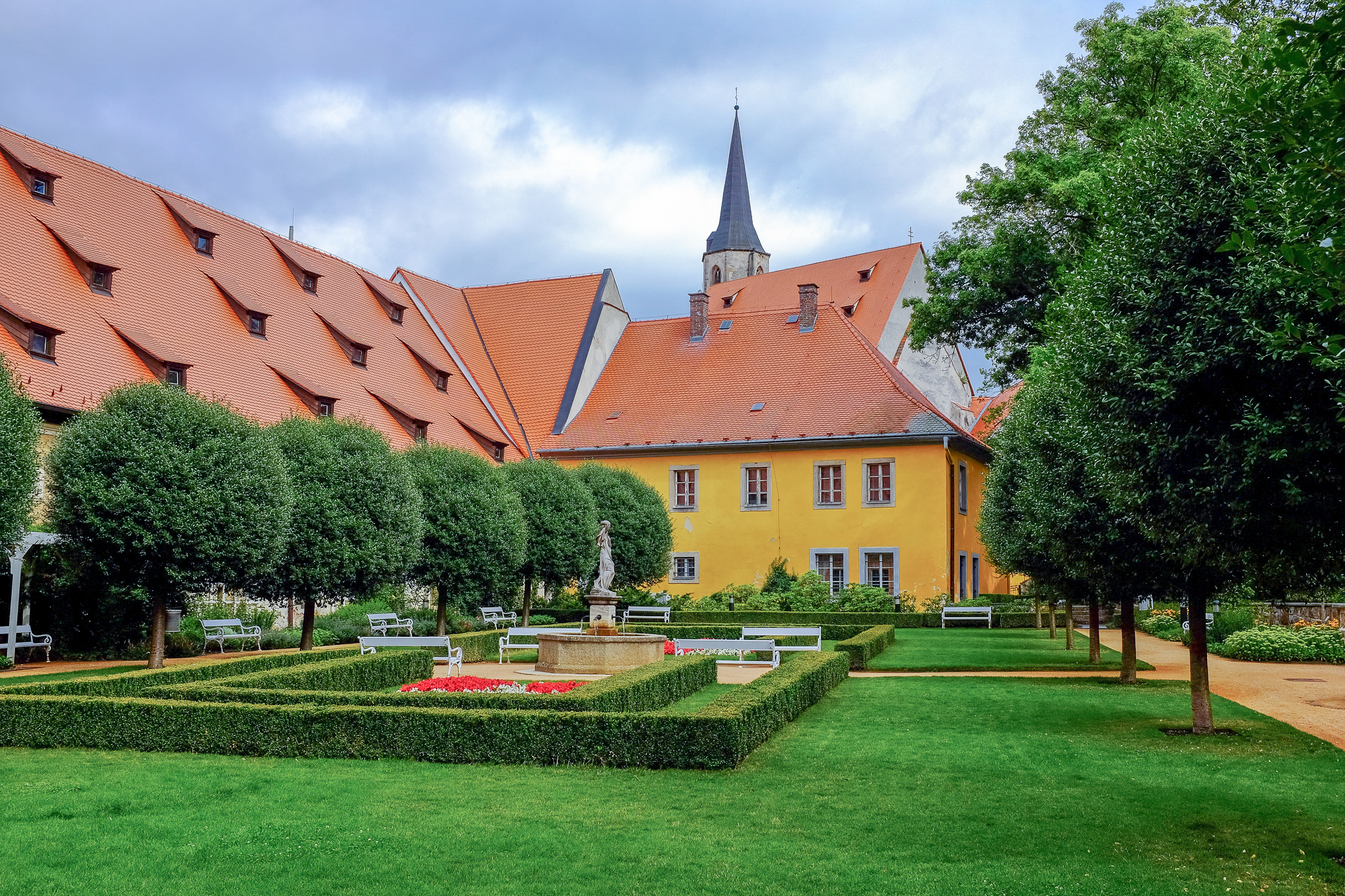
Gardens of the Franciscan monastery

== See also ==
- Madonna with St John the Baptist and St John the Evangelist (Cheb)
- Winged Altarpiece of Our Lady from Seeberg
