= Johannes Sylvius Egranus =

German theologian

Johannes Sylvius Egranus (born Johannes Wildauer; around 1480 in Eger, Bohemia (now Cheb, Czech Republic) – 1553 in Böhmisch-Kamnitz, Bohemia (now Česká Kamenice, Czech Republic)) was a German theologian, humanist, reformer and a friend of Martin Luther.

== Life and work ==
Johannes Wildenauer studied at the University of Leipzig after 1500, and earned his master's degree there in 1507, and subsequently became a lecturer. After extensive travel (with an acquaintance, Erasmus of Rotterdam in Basel), in 1517, he became a preacher in Zwickau. There, he was said to have had a dispute with the Franciscans on the then popular legends of Saint Anne. After discussions with Thomas Müntzer, he was, from 1521 to 1523, and from 1533 to 1534, an evangelical preacher in Sankt Joachimsthal (now Jáchymov). He also lived in Nuremberg, where he was known as being acquainted with Willibald Pirckheimer, and was the Pfarrverweser in Kulmbach (1524), Żagań (1526), and Chemnitz (1530). He was renamed after his birthplace Eger, modern-day Cheb, Egranus. His Apologetica responsio against Hieronymus Dungersheim, was published in Leipzig in April 1518, and Martin Luther wrote a preface. He was a vocal opponent of the Catholic theologian Johann Eck and, in 1520, stood with Martin Luther during the Reformation on the Bannbulle of the Pope Leo X.

Egranus is said to have disagreed with Martin Luther's de servo arbitrio. He did not question the ruling social system of the landlords. In his later sermons, an approach to Catholicism has been observed. He died on 1 June 1535 in St. Joachimstal. Rumours of his death being a consequence of excessive alcohol consumption has become something of a legend in publications.

== Works (selection) ==
- Apologetica responsio contra dogmata, Apologetica responsio contra dogmata, que […] a calumniatoribus inuulgata sunt, Wittenberg 1518 (digital)
- Contra Calumniatores suos Apologia, in qua diuam Annam nupsisse Claeophae & Salomae […] euangelicis et probatissimis testimoniis refellit, Nürnberg 1518 (digital)
- Ein Sermon von der Beicht und wie einer seiner Sunden mag geloßen, Leipzig 1522 (digital)
- Ein christlicher Unterricht von der Gerechtigkeit des Glaubens und von guten Wercken, Leipzig 1534 (digital)
- Ungedruckte Predigten des Johann Sylvius Egranus, gehalten in Zwickau und Joachimsthal 1519−1522 (Quellen und Darstellungen aus der Geschichte des Reformationsjahrhunderts 18), ed. by Georg Buchwald, Leipzig 1911

as editor

- Ambrose, Tres officiorum libri, Leipzig 1509 (digital)
