= JLL (company) =

Real estate consultancy firm

Jones Lang LaSalle Incorporated

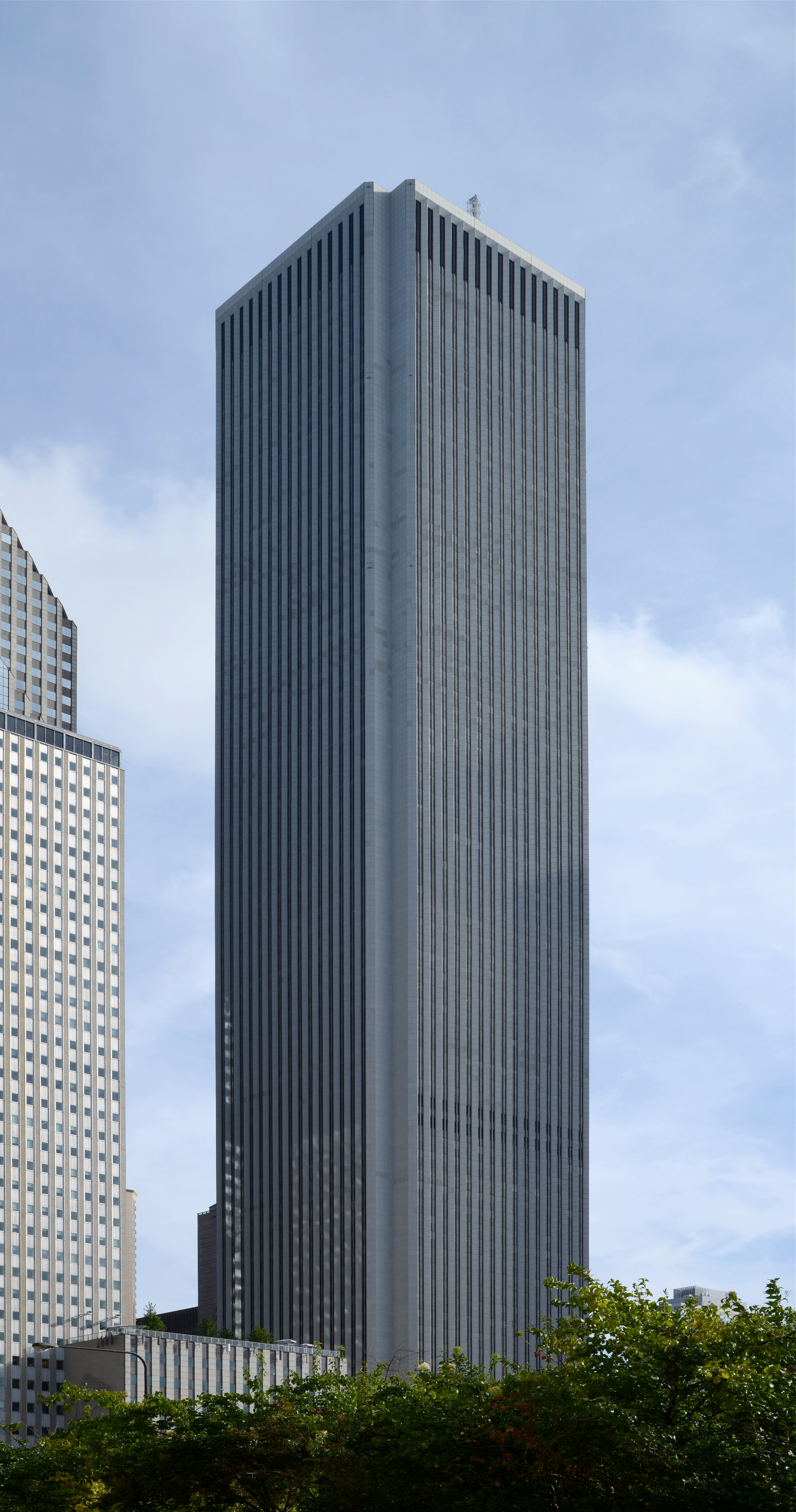
- JLL’s headquarters at the Aon Center (Chicago)
- Type: Public
- Traded as: NYSE: JLL; S&P 400 component
- ISIN: US48020Q1076
- Industry: Real estate
- Founded: 1783; 243 years ago London, United Kingdom; March 16, 1999; 27 years ago by the merger of Jones Lang Wootton and LaSalle Partners
- Headquarters: Aon Center; Chicago, Illinois, U.S.
- Area served: Worldwide
- Key people: Christian Ulbrich (president & CEO); Kelly Howe (CFO); Siddharth Mehta (chairman)
- Services: Investment management; Asset management; Real estate development; Capital markets; Advisory; Consulting; Leasing; Property management
- Revenue: ▲US$26.1 billion (2025)
- Operating income: ▲US$1.1 billion (2025)
- Net income: ▲US$792 million (2025)
- Total assets: ▲US$17.8 billion (2025)
- Total equity: ▲US$7.62 billion (2025)
- Number of employees: 113,200 (2025)
- Subsidiaries: LaSalle Investment Management; JLL Properties (for malls)
- Website: jll.com

Jones Lang LaSalle Incorporated (JLL) is a global real estate services company headquartered in Chicago. The company has offices in 80 countries. It offers investment management services worldwide, including services to institutional and retail investors, and to high-net-worth individuals, as well as technology products through JLL Technologies, and venture capital investments through its PropTech fund, JLL Spark. The company is ranked 175 on the Fortune 500.

== History ==
After LaSalle Partners' initial public offering (IPO) in 1997, which was led by its first CEO, Stuart Scott, it merged with Jones Lang Wootton in 1999, to form Jones Lang LaSalle (JLL) as part of a $435 million deal. Jones Lang Wootton was a London auctioneer that originated in the 1700s. By 1976, Jones Lang Wootton had expanded into the United States real estate market in New York City. The company had 4,000 employees in 33 countries around the time of the merger with LaSalle Partners.

William Sanders founded the real estate company International Development Corp in 1966 in El Paso, Texas. Sanders renamed the company LaSalle Partners in 1968 and relocated to Chicago, Illinois. The company first offered investment banking, investment management, and land services. By 1997, LaSalle had grown into three business divisions, Management Services, Corporate and Financial Services, and Investment Management, with ten U.S. corporate offices and seven international offices.

JLL purchased The Staubach Company in 2008. Roger Staubach served as executive chairman of JLL from 2008 until he retired in 2018. JLL merged with UK-based King Sturge in a £197 million deal in 2011. The combined business, with 2,700 employees and 43 offices, created the largest property agent in the UK, as reported by The Telegraph in 2011. The company acquired Irish-based Guardian Property Asset Management in 2015. LaSalle Investment Management, a subsidiary of JLL, managed $58 billion in real estate investments for institutional and retail clients, as of 2016. JLL had acquired 80 companies and established 100 offices worldwide by 2016.

The company expanded from commercial real estate services to include property technology, or "proptech", with the 2017 launch of its JLL Spark division. In June 2018, JLL Spark created a $100 million venture fund to invest in real estate start-ups, such as a technology to link office users with co-working spaces.

JLL announced the acquisition of HFF in a deal worth $2 billion in March 2019. The acquisition was completed in July 2019 and worth $1.8 billion.

In 2021, the company's technology division sold Stessa, the single-family rental asset management software company it acquired in 2018, to Roofstock as part of a deal in which JLL acquired a minority stake in Roofstock and it would provide services to JLL's clients.

JLL manages the London offices of the social media company Facebook. In July 2021, JLL sought the removal of a cleaner from the offices when, in his capacity as a trade union representative, he organised a protest against a doubling of the cleaners' workloads.

In August 2021, JLL announced the acquisition of Skyline Al which is an AI platform that provides a comprehensive analysis of commercial real estate properties.

In late 2021 and early 2022, JLL made two "proptech" acquisitions. In November 2021, it purchased the property management software company Building Engines, and in February 2022 it acquired Hank, a company developing AI-based technology to improve the energy efficiency of buildings.

In June 2023, JLL launched Carbon Pathfinder, a software tool it had developed for companies to identify the carbon emissions from their buildings and ways to reduce those emissions.

The company developed a large language model (LLM) tool called JLL GPT for its employees, and launched it in August 2023. It was the first such model to be launched by a major real estate services company. The generative AI model is being trained on JLL's data as of 2023 and was developed to be able to answer questions about commercial real estate.

In 2024, the company announced a partnership with IBM, using IBM's technology to develop a platform that tracks sustainability data for JLL's clients' commercial properties. According to the company, the platform is intended to collect data and provide reporting on JLL's clients' environmental sustainability goals, including decarbonization.

In 2024, JLL also acquired two technology companies to expand its services. The firm acquired data center services company SKAE Power Solutions in May 2024, forming a technical services division called SKAE, a JLL company. They also acquired Raise Commercial Real Estate, a firm that had developed a technology platform for companies to manage their real estate holdings.

In March 2025, the company acquired renewable energy sector investment bank Javelin Capital.

== Operations ==
JLL is headquartered in Chicago, Illinois, and as of April 2026 was the second-largest commercial real estate services firm in the world. The company has more than 113,000 employees in 80 countries, as of December 2025.

Services include investment management, asset management, sales and leasing, property management, project management, development, property technology, and clean energy investment banking. In 2014, the organization shortened its name to JLL for marketing purposes, while the legal name remained Jones Lang LaSalle Incorporated.

Former company president Christian Ulbrich succeeded Colin Dyer as CEO in October 2016. Sheila Penrose served as board chairwoman starting in 2005, and was replaced by Siddharth ("Bobby") Mehta in 2020.

In 2022, JLL founded the JLL Foundation, a non-profit organization focused on climate change and sustainability. The foundation provides zero-interest loans to startup companies that provide or are developing sustainable products or technologies, for example recycling plastic waste into construction products.

The company operates through five segments: Markets Advisory, Capital Markets, Work Dynamics, JLL Technologies and LaSalle.

== See also ==
- CBRE Group
- Cushman & Wakefield
- Newmark Group
