= Madonna with St John the Baptist and St John the Evangelist (Cheb) =

Trio of statues

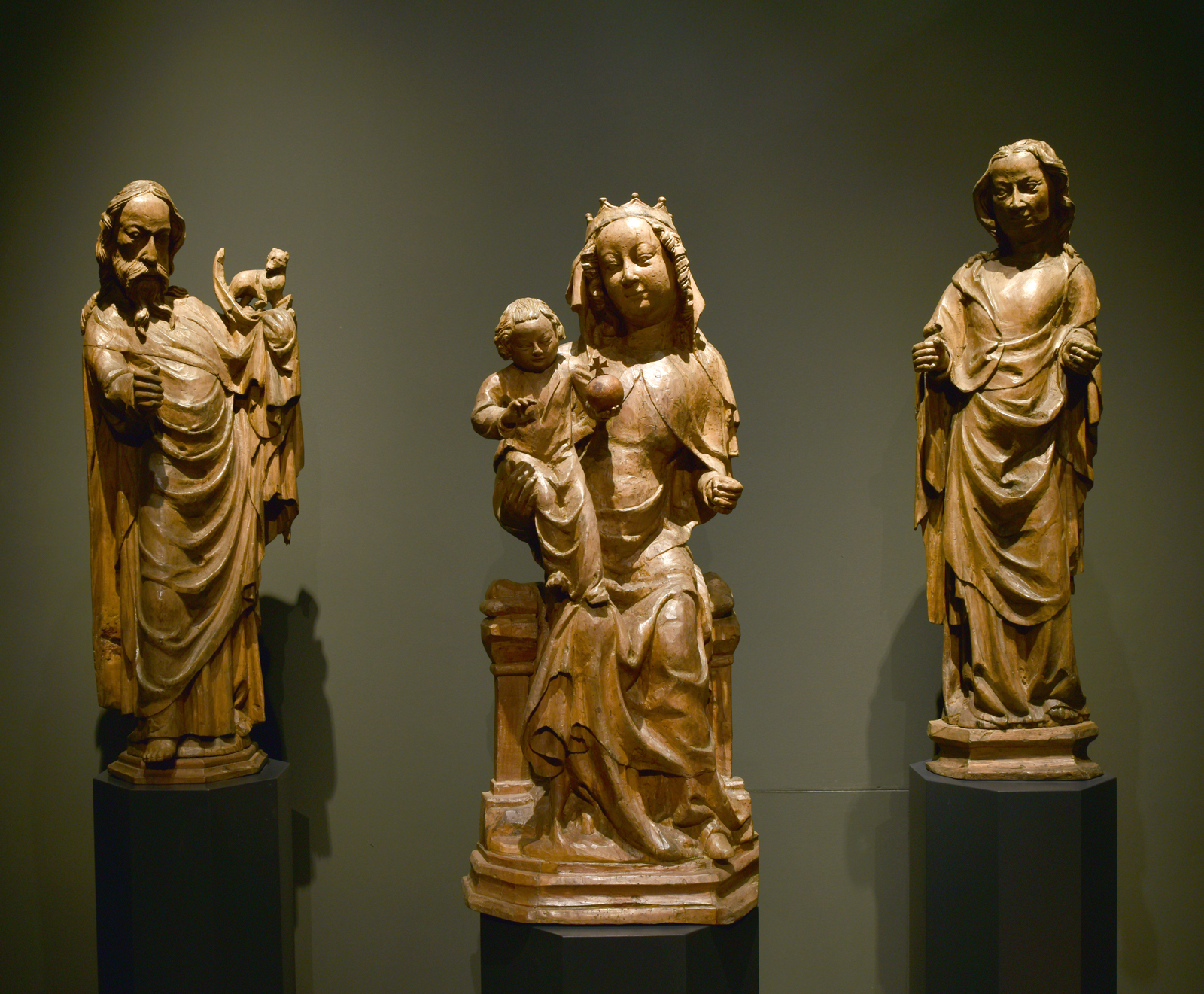
Madonna with St John the Baptist and St John the Evangelist (1360s), Gallery of Fine Arts in Cheb

The Madonna with St John the Baptist and St John the Evangelist are wooden statues dating from the 1360s, which were part of the altarpiece in one of the churches in Cheb. The sculptures represent the early phase of a new artistic style, influenced by painting and especially by manuscript miniatures from the court circle. The quality and style of the carving indicate that the works were the product of a workshop in Prague. They are part of the exhibition of Gothic sculpture in the Gallery of Fine Arts in Cheb.

== Origin ==
A provenance from the first parish church in Cheb, which was demolished in 1812, is not certain. The only argument in favour of this is that this church was dedicated to St John the Baptist, whose statue was in a prominent position in the altarpiece, to the right of the Virgin Mary. At the time the three statues were made, however, the Church of St John the Baptist had long lost its importance, and donations were concentrated more in the Church of St Nicholas. The rights of patronage to the latter church were held by the Order of Teutonic Knights, whose representatives maintained contacts with the royal court in Prague, which was close to the workshop that produced the statues.

== Original location ==
The most recent research is in no doubt that all three statues came from the corpus of an altarpiece that has not survived, in spite of the fact that there is no exact contemporary analogy for the arrangement of an Enthroned Madonna with St John the Baptist on her right and St John the Evangelist on her left. A schema of three figures with a central sculpture of a Madonna was quite common in Central Europe in the period 1350-1450. A pair of statues of the two St Johns, which may have been part of an altarpiece with a central statue of a Madonna, have been preserved in Tovačov and Rychleby (Złoty Stok, Lower Silesia).

== Artistic situation ==
The statues in Cheb were created during an exceptionally interesting period for Bohemian art in the third quarter of the 14th century. During the reign of the King of Bohemia and Holy Roman Emperor Charles IV, very favourable conditions for the development of sculptural work prevailed in the Czech lands. Economic prosperity and political stability facilitated an unparalleled intensity in the construction of churches and their furnishing. The precondition for the functioning of many workshops producing altar retables was the tremendous investment into altar foundations. The example of Charles’ initiatives as a founder and builder galvanised many members of his court, and also other church dignitaries, noblemen, and burghers, opening up many opportunities for artistic craftsmen of all types. The high demand and excellent conditions attracted the best creative artists from all over Europe. The fact that craftsmen trained in different parts of Europe, especially in Italy, France, and the German-speaking lands, came together here in the centre of the Empire was reflected in an unusual variety of styles and a dynamic development.

In an endeavour not to repeat what had already been achieved, sculptors came up in quick succession with new original designs for presenting different layers of meaning in their depictions of Madonnas and saints. Their main means of doing so was the reproduction of a wealth of visual experiences, either directly on the basis of observation (by introducing elements of irregularity, randomness, or ordinariness into previously idealised forms) or by pictorial evocation with the help of drapery, which varied both in the style of arranging the folds and in the texture of the material. Thanks to the unique situation in the artistic centre of Prague in the time of Charles IV, styles could be continually enhanced through new inspirations from artists familiar with contemporary art in Italy and Western Europe, which came together, mingled, and were transformed in Prague. For example, court painting circles influenced woodcarving by the introduction of the compositional principle which brought new dynamism to figures with the help of feet positioned at different heights and which effectively supported the illusion of spatial depth in relief sculptures. A well-known example, which is also the best documented, is the relationship between Enthroned Madonnas and the style of the illuminators who worked in the court of the Archbishop of Prague in the 1360s.

== Description and context ==
=== The Virgin Mary with the Child Jesus ===
A sculpture in the round carved from lindenwood, 97 x 39 x 19 cm, hollowed out at the back, polychrome missing. Restored 1964 and 1987, 1994 (J. Živný). Inv. no. P1

The statue represents a traditional type of the Enthroned Virgin Mary with a clothed Christ standing on her knee. She is wearing a close-fitting robe and a mantle fastened over her breast. The Madonna is seated on a three-dimensional throne with a cushion, and on her head she has a veil and a crown. Her right hand embraces the Child Jesus, and in her left hand she evidently held a sceptre. Both figures have their faces turned towards the viewer. Christ holds an orb in his left hand and imparts a blessing with his right hand. This type of Marian sculpture was widespread in the period 1270-1350, but was still occasionally to be found in the time of the Beautiful Style. The sculpture in Cheb differs from earlier statues of this type in the unstable posture of the Child Jesus. In the period following this, he was often represented as a lively gesticulating child, extending his hand towards his mother (Madonna of Hrádek near Benešov, 1360-1370, Madonna of Kerhartice, 1361-1368).

The system of drapery is asymmetrically arranged around the right leg into distinctive sets of tubiform cascades and creates a dramatic emphasis. Models for this type can be found in early 14th-century French sculpture. The deep fold in the mantle in the form of a V between the knees is characteristic of French ivory carving in the second quarter of the 14th century. The Madonna in Cheb also has possible links to Moravian sculpture from the period immediately after 1350 (Madonna of Tovačov). The latter work is a precursor of the illusionistic deepening of the third dimension and foreshortening from below, and has the same facial type as the Madonna in Cheb. The manner of carving the drapery links it to the Madonna of Kerhartice.

=== St John the Baptist ===
A sculpture in the round carved from lindenwood, 90 x 33.5 x 23 cm, hollowed out from behind, remains of chalk ground, polychrome missing. Restored by J. Živný (1994). Inv. no. P2

The saint is depicted as an older, thickset man with long hair and a forked beard. In his raised left hand he holds a medallion with the Lamb of God (partially damaged); his right hand probably held a reed cross, which is a traditional attribute of John the Baptist. The saint is wearing several layers of clothing, and another of his attributes, a garment of camel’s hair, was evidently originally represented in the polychrome which is now absent. The statue represents an early example of the extremely asymmetric compositional scheme which later became typical for Silesian woodcarving, in particular. The lack of balance is created mainly by the positioning of the attribute and the heavy drapery on the right, although the weight is on the foot on the left. The large head with an ecstatic expression is unusual in the Czech environment.

The statue of St John the Baptist follows on from the tradition of 13th-century sculpture in the style of Antiquity, but at the same time it displays some progressive features – especially the tendency to emphasise the three-dimensional contours of the body and the livelier gestures of the hands. The overall conception is close to that of the Madonna from the parish church in Broumov, the Eigl Madonna, and the Madonna from the Church of St James in Jihlava. The expressive character of the face is similar to the Prophets from Rottweil, the Apostle from the pillar of the choir in the Church of St James in Brno, and the St Johns from Továčov.

=== St John the Evangelist ===
A sculpture in the round carved from lindenwood, 95.5 x 29.5 x 18.5 cm, hollowed out from behind, remains of chalk ground, polychrome missing. The hands of the statue are not original. Restored in 1964 and 1994 (J. Živný). Inv. no. P3

The statue was identified as John the Evangelist on the basis of its type (a youth with long hair) and by analogy with similar pairs of sculptures, which already had a tradition going back to around 1300. Neither the hands nor the attributes have survived. It can be deduced that originally John held a book, a chalice, or a medallion with an eagle. The balanced and symmetrical composition is based on older models. The closest analogies are the St John the Evangelist from the Church of St Mary Magdalen in Wroclaw (1350-1362) and the John from the retable of the main altar in Levoča. As with the other sculptures in this group from Cheb, the way the relationship between the body core and the surface is represented reveals a search for a new sculptural style.

=== Related works ===
- Madonna from Wachau (1360–1365)
- Madonna from Tovačov (1360–1370)
- Madonna from Hrádek u Benešova (1360–1370)
- Madonna from Bečov (1364–1368)
- Madonna from Kerhartice (1361–1368)
- Madonna from Rödelwitz, Eisenach museum (ca. 1370)
- Altarpiece in Puschendorf (ca. 1370)
- Silesian Madonnas on lions

== Sources ==
- Aleš Mudra, Kontexty italizujícího sochařství doby lucemburské v severozápadních Čechách, in: Trans montes. Podoby středověkého umění v severozápadních Čechách. Aleš MUDRA / Michaela OTTOVÁ (ed.), Praha 2014, s.169-187, on line
- Jana Hrbáčová (ed), Madony na lvu a měkký styl třetí čtvrtiny 14. století. Příspěvky z mezinárodního symposia. Madonnas on lions and the soft style of the third quarter of the 14th century, proceedings from the international symposium, Muzeum umění Olomouc 2014, ISBN 978-80-87149-86-7
- Jiří Vykoukal (ed.), Umění gotiky na Chebsku, Galerie výtvarného umění v Chebu 2009, ISBN 978-80-85016-92-5
- Jiří Vykoukal (ed.), Gothic Art in the Cheb Region, Cheb 2009, ISBN 978-80-85016-93-2
- Markéta Jarošová, Jiří Kuthan, Stefan Scholz (eds.), Prag und die großen Kulturzentren Europas in der Zeit der Luxemburger (1310–1437). Prague and Great Cultural Centres of Europe in the Luxembourgeois Period (1310–1437), Praha 2008, pp. 449–457.
- Jiří Fajt (ed.), Karel IV., císař z Boží milosti. Kultura a umění za vlády Lucemburků 1310-1437, Academia, Praha 2006, ISBN 80-200-1399-7
- Albert Kutal, Gotické sochařství, in: Dějiny českého výtvarného umění, Academia Praha 1984
- Jana Ševčíková, Chebská gotická plastika, Galerie výtvarného umění v Chebu 1975
- Albert Kutal, České gotické sochařství 1350-1450, Praha 1962
- Josef Opitz, Sochařství v Čechách za doby Lucemburků I, Praha 1935
