= Neda Al-Hilali =

American fiber artist (1938–2025)

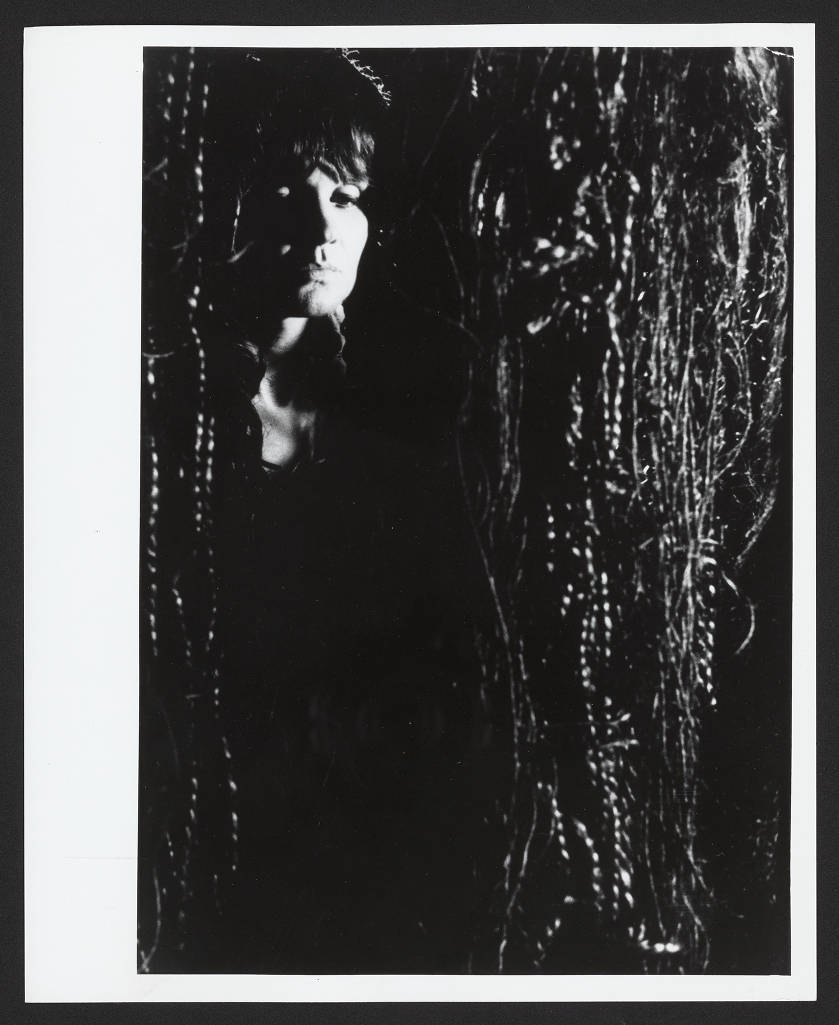
- Al-Hilali at "Sculpture in Fiber" exhibition, 1972
- Born: 26 November 1938; Cheb, Czechoslovakia
- Died: 13 September 2025 (aged 86); Mexico
- Education: University of California, Los Angeles
- Known for: Fiber art

Neda Al-Hilali (26 November 1938 – 13 September 2025) was an American fiber artist. Her art was described by The Los Angeles Times as "turn[ing] traditional fiber crafts inside out."

== Biography ==
Al-Hilali, née Walburga Luise Hedwig Marianne Boehm, was born in Cheb, Czechoslovakia. Throughout her life, she lived in Bavaria, Germany and Baghdad, Iraq, before settling in Los Angeles, California in 1962. She trained as an artist in Europe, and extensively at the University of California, Los Angeles.

Her early works in the 1960s consisted of flat weavings and knotted hangings. These were followed by large, room-filling installations and a series of outdoor installations including giant brown-paper "Tongues" installed on Venice beach.

Al-Hilali described her work as "foot tracks of prolonged attention and energy," as each required many hours of intensive handiwork.

Her work is part of the collections of various museums, including the Renwick Gallery, Museum of Arts and Design, Utah Museum of Fine Arts, and the Smithsonian American Art Museum. Her papers are kept by the Archives of American Art.

Al-Hilali died on 13 September 2025, at the age of 86.

== Exhibitions ==
- 1971-72 Deliberate Entanglements: An Exhibition of Fabric Forms, UCLA Art Galleries
- 1985 Neda Alhilali: selected works, 1968-1985, Los Angeles Municipal Art Gallery at Barnsdall Park
- 1985, Fiberworks: an invitational exhibit of contemporary fiberworks, University of Texas at El Paso Department of Art
- 1985 Artists Select Artists, Modern Master Tapestries.
- 1986 Legends in fiber, Octagon Center for the Arts, Ames, Iowa
- 1988 Current works in fiber, Georgia State University Art Gallery
- 2024–2025 Subversive, Skilled, Sublime: Fiber Art by Women, Smithsonian American Art Museum
