= Christian Ulbrich =

German real estate executive

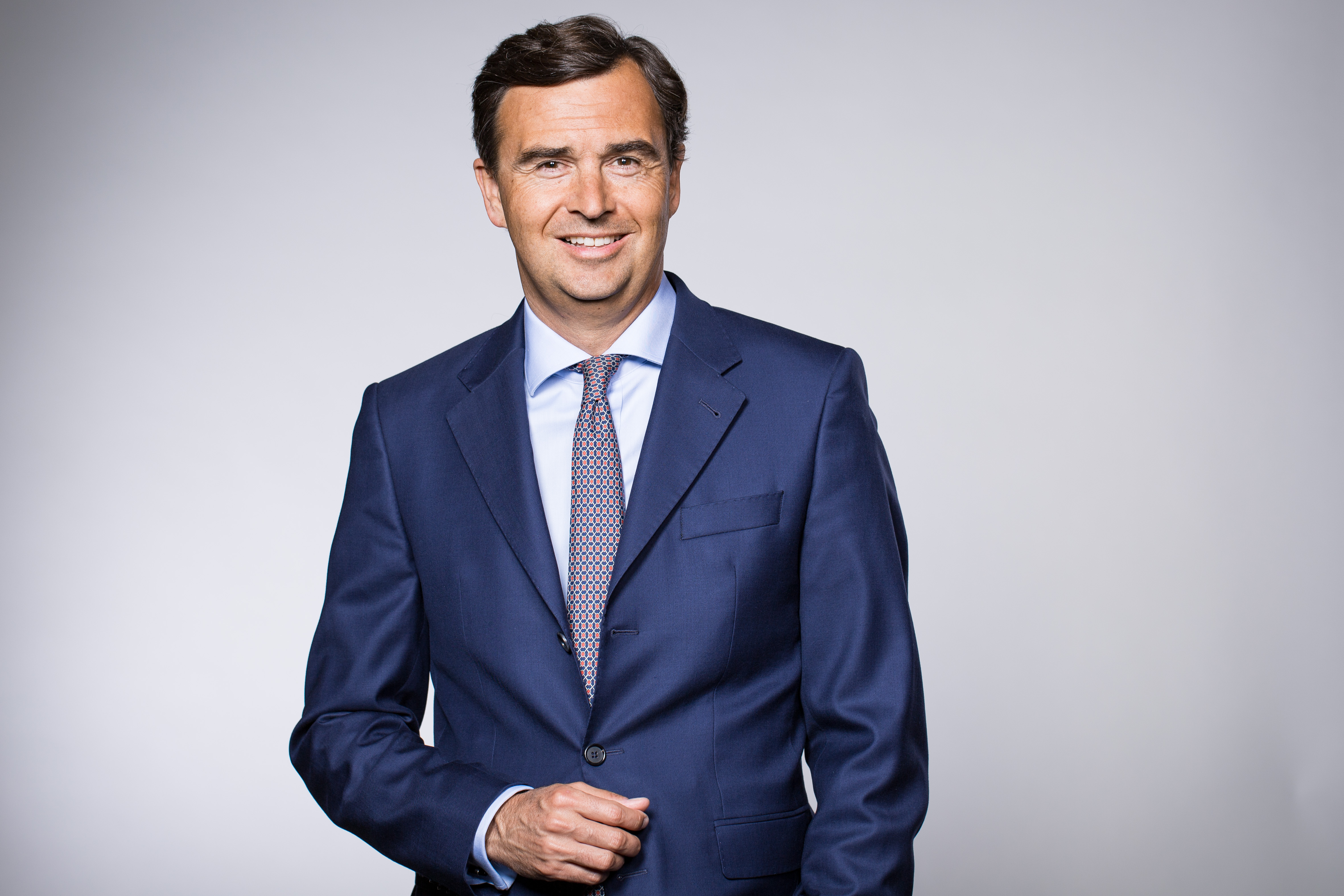
- Born: 1966 (age 59–60)\ Hamburg, Germany
- Education: Master's degree University of Hamburg
- Occupations: President and chief executive officer of JLL
- Board member of: Jones Lang LaSalle Incorporated, Vonovia

Christian Ulbrich (born 1966) is a German business executive who is the president and chief executive officer of real estate services company JLL.

== Career ==
After graduating from the University of Hamburg, Ulbrich initially worked in finance roles at MeesPierson and Rabobank Nederland. In 1996, he was named the CEO of Bank Companie Nord, following which he was hired by Warburg Bank to lead its real estate group HIH.

He was hired by real estate services company JLL to manage its German operations in 2005. In 2016, JLL named him as its global president and the company's global CEO. According to the German business publication Immobilien Zeitung, he was the first German in global leadership of one of the major real estate companies.

Since then, Christian Ulbrich has promoted the use and further development of technologies in the company. As part of this, he created JLL Spark, an investment fund that supports technology startups with products for the real estate industry.

== Other positions ==
Ulbrich is part of the World Economic Forum's International Business Council and its Alliance of CEO Climate Leaders.
