= Josef Ulbrich =

Austrian academic (1843–1910)

Rector of the German University in Prague
- In office 1897–1898
- Preceded by: Anton Marty
- Succeeded by: Anton Kurz

Member of the Czech Parliament
- In office 1905–1910

Member of the House of Lords of Austria
- In office 1905–1910

Personal details
- Born: 23 October 1843 Eger, Austria-Hungary
- Died: 20 August 1910 (aged 66) Prague, Austria-Hungary
- Party: Constitutional Party
- Occupation: Politician

Josef Ulbrich or Joseph Ulbrich (23 October 1843 – 20 August 1910), was an Austro-Hungarian lawyer and university teacher from Bohemia. He was also the rector of Charles University in Prague and a member of the Czech Provincial Assembly.

== Early career ==
Ulbrich studied law at Charles University. On 23 May 1867 he was awarded the title of Doctor of Law and joined the practice court. He was a top student teacher at the Provincial Court in Prague, and, from 1869, judicial adjunct to the Regional Court in České Budějovice. In 1871, he was promoted to become a clerk at the Regional Court in Prague. In 1873, he joined the prosecutor's office as a financial clerk. In 1876, he became a teacher in the Department of Economics, Business and Industrial Statistics at the German Polytechnic University in Prague, where he taught as an adjunct professor until his death.

== As an academic administrator ==
On 16 February 1876, he was appointed the docent of Charles University in Prague. He worked as a private lecturer in state law. From 25 September 1879, and from January 11, 1884, he was a professor at the German University in Prague (in the early 1880s there was a joint Czech-German University at Charles University). From 1897 to 1898, he held the post of rector of the university, and was also Dean of the Faculty of Law twice (from 1890 to 1891 and from 1906 to 1907). He held this position during difficult times of extreme Czech-German conflict related to the Badeni language regulations, when there were verbal and physical confrontations between students of the two nationalities. In June 1897, Ulbrich's proposal for resolving language issues in the Czech Republic was published in the Neue Freie Presse, which joined calls for an administrative division of the country by national borders, including alterations to the boundaries of judicial districts. In 1898, he received the title of court council. From 1900 onward, he was chairman of the German Association for the Dissemination of Public Information (German: Deutscher Verein für Verbreitung gemeinnütziger Kenntnisse). From 1901 onward, he was chairman of the board of examiners for statecraft. In 1904, he was re-elected rector of the German University in Prague, but declined to continue. From 1905 onward, he was chairman of the expert board for copyright, and was also active in the Association for the History of the Germans in Bohemia (German: Verein für Geschichte der Deutschen in Böhmen). He wrote, among other works, Lehrbuch des österreichischen Staatsrechts (Berlin, 1883), and Lehrbuch des österreichischen Verwaltungsrechts (Vienna, 1904). His speciality was political science and administrative law.

== Political career ==
By the turn of the century Ulbrich had started to move into politics. From 1897 to 1898, he sat on the Czech Provincial Assembly. On 18 August 1905, he was appointed a life member of the House of Lords (the unelected upper chamber of the Imperial Council), where he joined the Constitutional Party. After the annexation of Bosnia in 1908, he worked on the government documents regarding the reception of Islam and Islamic law in the legal system of the monarchy.

He died in August 1910 in a diaconal house in Prague after several months of severe illness.
