= Ulbrich (company) =

American steel company

Ulbrich Stainless Steels & Special Metals, Inc.
- The Ulbrich logo used since 1997
- Type: Private
- Industry: Steel and metal distribution and rolling
- Predecessor: The Fred Ulbrich Company
- Founded: 1924 in Wallingford, Connecticut, United States
- Founder: Frederick Christian Ulbrich Sr.
- Headquarters: North Haven, Connecticut, United States
- Area served: Global
- Key people: Jon Ulbrich (Chief executive officer); Chris Ulbrich (Chairman of the board)
- Products: Precision Strip & foil, Shaped Wire, Fine Wire, Flat Wire, Wire
- Number of employees: 700+
- Website: ulbrich.com

Ulbrich Stainless Steels & Special Metals, Inc. is an American manufacturer and distributor of precision strip, foil, and wire products made from stainless steels and other specialty alloys. Headquartered in North Haven, Connecticut, the company operates manufacturing facilities, service centers, and sales offices in North America, Europe, and Asia.

== History ==
Ulbrich was founded in 1924 by Frederick Christian Ulbrich Sr. as The Fred Ulbrich Company in Wallingford, Connecticut. The company began as a scrap metal and used automobile-parts business. During the 1930s, Fred Ulbrich Sr. expanded into the manufacture of stainless steel cutlery, establishing Victory Cutlery Company.

During World War II, Ulbrich installed its first rolling mill and a slitter and supplied stainless steel cutlery to the United States military. Victory Cutlery was sold in 1955. That year, Ulbrich purchased a 20-high Sendzimir rolling mill and incorporated as Ulbrich Stainless Steels, Inc.

During the 1960s, Ulbrich expanded into nickel-based alloys and other specialty metals for aerospace applications and developed in-house testing capabilities to meet aerospace-industry requirements.

In 1968, Ulbrich opened Ulbrich of Illinois in Alsip, Illinois, as its first stainless steel strip service center. In 1969, metal components rolled by Ulbrich were used aboard NASA’s Apollo 11 spacecraft. That year, the company adopted its current name, Ulbrich Stainless Steels & Special Metals, Inc., and established Ulbrich Wire, Inc., now known as Ulbrich Shaped Wire, in North Haven, Connecticut.

During the 1970s, Frederick Ulbrich Sr. transferred ownership of the company to his three sons, Fred Jr., Dick, and Dan. The company continued to invest in production equipment and process controls to expand capacity, improve quality, and produce thinner-gauge material.

During the 1980s and 1990s, Ulbrich expanded its manufacturing and distribution network. Ulbrich of New England opened in Wallingford in 1982, followed by additional operations in the United States, Mexico, Europe, and Asia.

In the late 1990s, Chris Ulbrich became President, representing the third generation of the Ulbrich family to lead the company.

On January 31, 2022, Ulbrich acquired ATI’s specialty rolled-products distribution facility in Pico Rivera, California. The operation was subsequently renamed Ulbrich of California.

In 2024, Ulbrich acquired two facilities formerly operated as part of ATI’s Precision Rolled Strip business: a manufacturing facility in New Bedford, Massachusetts, and a service center in Remscheid, Germany. The operations were renamed Ulbrich Precision Alloys and Ulbrich Europe Metals, respectively.

Ulbrich celebrated its centennial in 2024. Effective January 1, 2025, Jon Ulbrich became Chief Executive Officer, representing the fourth generation of family leadership, while Chris Ulbrich became Chairman of the Board.

== Products ==
Ulbrich manufactures and distributes precision-rolled strip and foil, as well as shaped, fine, and flat wire. Its products are used in aerospace, medical, automotive, energy, electronics, oil and gas, consumer, and industrial markets, among others.

The company processes over 160 specialty metals, including stainless steels, nickel-, titanium-, cobalt-, and bi-metals based alloys.

== Locations ==
Ulbrich operates manufacturing facilities, service centers, and sales offices in North America, Europe, and Asia. Its operations are organized across precision-rolled strip manufacturing, strip distribution and service centers, wire manufacturing, and corporate and sales offices.

Precision-Rolled Strip Manufacturing

• Ulbrich Specialty Strip Mill — Wallingford, Connecticut, United States

• Ulbrich Precision Alloys — New Bedford, Massachusetts, United States

Strip Distribution and Service Centers

• Ulbrich of New England — Wallingford, Connecticut, United States

• Ulbrich of Illinois — Alsip, Illinois, United States

• Ulbrich of California — Pico Rivera, California, United States

• Ulbrinox — Querétaro, Mexico

• Ulbrich Europe Metals — Remscheid, Germany

Wire Manufacturing

• Ulbrich Shaped Wire — North Haven, Connecticut, United States

• Ulbrich Specialty Wire Products — Westminster, South Carolina, United States

• Ulbrich of Austria — Müllendorf, Austria

Corporate and Sales Offices

• Corporate Headquarters — North Haven, Connecticut, United States

• Ulbrich West Coast — Fresno, California, United States

• Ulbrich Asia Shanghai — Shanghai, China
