= Ulbricht =

Ulbricht is a German surname. Notable people with this name include:

- Beate Ulbricht (1944–1991), Soviet adopted daughter of Walter and Lotte Ulbricht
- Catherine Ulbricht, American pharmacist
- Ernst Emil Ulbricht (1864–1900), German-born American cyclist
- Julian Ulbricht (born 1999), German footballer
- Leon Ulbricht (born 2004), German snowboarder
- Lotte Ulbricht (1903–2002), East-German communist politician, second wife of Walter Ulbricht
- Lutz Ulbricht (1942–2022), German Olympic rower
- Manfred Ulbricht (born 1947), German cyclist
- Rick Ulbricht (born 1991), German politician
- Ross Ulbricht (born 1984), owner of the online black market Silk Road and the person behind the pseudonym "Dread Pirate Roberts"
- Sigrid Ulbricht (born 1958), German long jumper
- Thomas Ulbricht (born 1985), German paralympian
- Walter Ulbricht (1893–1973), East-German communist politician
  - Ulbricht Doctrine
  - Ulbricht Group
  - Walter-Ulbricht-Stadion

== See also ==
- Ulbricht sphere (integrating sphere), optical component
