= Petrovicky =

Petrovicky may refer to:

- Petrovický, a surname
- Petrovičky, a municipality in the Czech Republic
