= Aleš Lamr =

Czech painter (1943–2024)

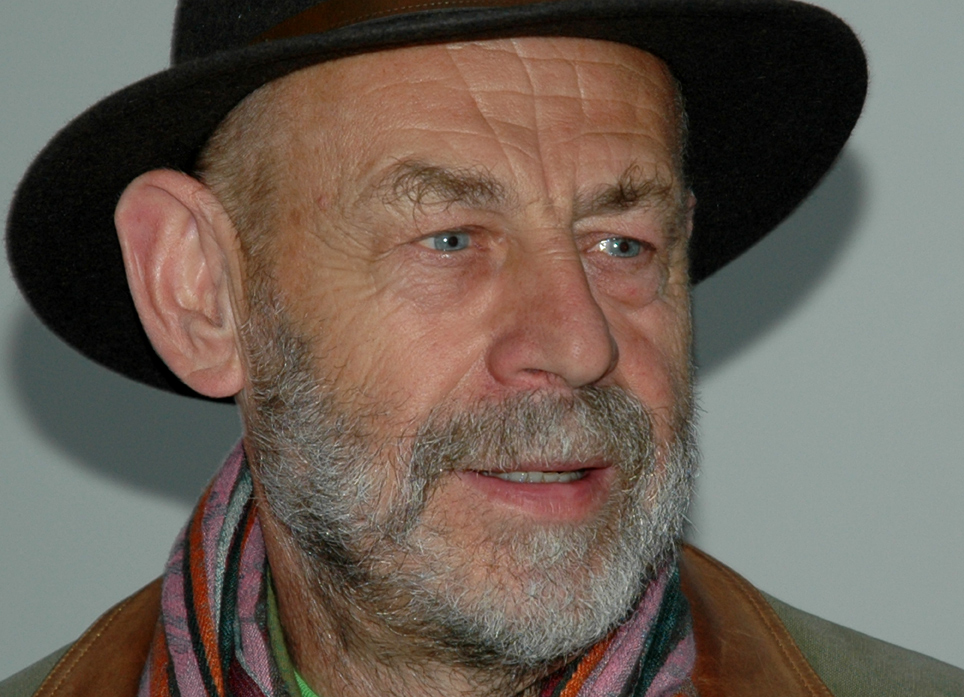
- Lamr in 2012
- Born: 12 June 1943; Olomouc, Protectorate of Bohemia and Moravia
- Died: 16 February 2024 (aged 80)
- Education: State School of Applied Arts in Brno
- Awards: Salvador Dalí Award for artistic activity (2000)
- Website: Aleš Lamr website

Aleš Lamr (12 June 1943 – 16 February 2024) was a Czech visual artist. He presented himself as a painter, printmaker, author of murals and ceramic reliefs, sculptor and ceramist.

== Life ==
Aleš Lamr was born the eldest son of three children in a family of stove-builders and ceramists, settled in Litovel over several generations. His sisters are also artists (Eva Bergeå Lamrová, * 1946, painter and ceramicist, Blanka, Aleš * 1949, photographer and ceramicist). The ceramic workshop, with which many important Moravian artists collaborated, is still active today. In 1974, a family exhibition of ceramics held in Ústí nad Orlicí, was attended by ten members of the Lamr family.

Lamr received his primary education in Litovel (1948–1957) and his further direction was influenced by the Litovel painter and teacher Karel Homola, a pupil of Max Švabinský. In 1957, Aleš Lamr, as the son of a tradesman, was sent to an apprenticeship at the Ostrava-Karviná Mines. In Ostrava, he attended a primary art school run by the Litovel artists Zdeněk Kučera (1935–2016) and Jaroslav Rusek (1932–2016).

From 1960 to 1964, he studied at the Secondary School of Arts and Crafts, Department of Spatial Design in Brno, under prof. arch. J.A. Šalek. There he gained experience in the field of scenography and mastered artistic techniques ranging from painting and printmaking to working with wood, glass, metal, plastic and paper. He applied unsuccessfully for admission to the sculpture studio at the Academy of Fine Arts in Prague. In 1964–1966, he completed his basic military service, where he first joined the Vít Nejedlý Army Art Ensemble as a Mime artist and later was assigned as an artist in publicity and in a mobile print shop. At the height of the New Wave of Czech cinema (1966–1968), he worked as an assistant director at the Czechoslovak State Film at Barrandov (directors Ivo Novák, Ladislav Helge, Josef Mach, among others). At that time he shared a studio in Štěpánská Street with photographer Helena Pospíšilová-Wilsonová and belonged to the circle of artists of the Křižovnická School.

From 1968 he was registered as a candidate of the then Union of Czech Visual Artists and could earn a living as a freelance artist (he was not admitted as a full member until 1989). He first exhibited independently in 1968 at the private Small Gallery in Žižkov (defunct since 1970) and in 1970 at the Young Gallery in Mánes. In 1969 he travelled for the first time to Stockholm, where his sister was married, and visited the galleries there. He was influenced by Pablo Picasso's monumental sculptures in Moderna Museet Park. He exhibited at the important national show of contemporary painting, Painting 69 in Brno. In 1969–1970, he received a scholarship from the Union of Czech Visual Artists and produced several film posters.

In 1971 he moved to Malá Strana and the following year he married textile artist Blanka Grebeňová. His son Řehoř (born 1973) is an entrepreneur, his sons Hanuš (born 1976) and Jan (born 1983) are artists. In 1978 he acquired a studio in Malá Strana and began to work on lithography in the lithography workshop of Jan Tůma. Later he also collaborated with lithographers M. Řehák, J. Lípa and J. Kejklíř.

In 1975 he travelled to France and in 1979, in connection with his first foreign exhibition, to the United States, where he met Meda Mládková and visited galleries in New York and Washington, D.C. In the 1980s he travelled to France, the Netherlands and Germany. During the 1980s, he participated in various unofficial projects (Malostranské dvorky, Krabičky - Jazz Section, the private Kruh Gallery in Kostelec nad Černými lesy). Beginning in 1982 he collaborated as a designer with the Husa na provázku theatre in Brno (theatre events Mr. Třesky and Mr. Plesky, 1987, with Jaroslav Kořán, 20 years of Husa na provázku theatre).

At the time of the fall of the communist regime in November 1989, he created two posters (New Life, Happened on National Street). In the early 1990s, at the request of Václav Havel, he created several murals in the presidential office and in 1995 in his private villa. He collaborated with a number of architects (E. Zavadil, M. Rajniš, B. Dudař, J. Lábus) and had dozens of realizations in mural painting and ceramics (together with M. Neubert). In 1992, he exhibited at the Seville Expo '92 (the Burning Bush exhibition, originally in the Emmaus Monastery) and in 1993, together with arch. P. Fuchs participated in the artistic design of the pavilion for Expo '93 in Taejŏn, South Korea.

In 2002 he moved to a new studio in Hostivař.

Lamr was a member of the art department of the Umělecká beseda and between 1991 and 2013 he was a member of the Hollar Society. He lived and worked in Prague and Petrovičky.

Lamr died on 16 February 2024, at the age of 80.

=== Awards ===
- 1985 3rd Prize Premió Juan Miro, Barcelona
- 1988 Honourable mention in the Best Book of the Year competition (illustrations of Caribbean poetry)
- 1989 Statutory Prize of the III Watercolour Triennial, Lučenec
- 1995 Commercial Bank Prize, Graphic Art of the Year 1994, Prague
- 1996 Plzeňská banka Prize, Biennial of Drawing Plzeň
- 2000 Salvador Dalí Award for artistic activity
- 2005 Excudit Prize, Graphic Art of the Year 2005, Prague

== Work ==
=== Paintings, drawings and prints ===
Aleš Lamr was one of the few essential colourists on the Czech art scene and his paintings are unmistakable in their style. They are characterized by flat drawings and marks abstracted from reality, filled with contrasting colours that look like a playful mosaic. Lamr's drawings are integrally composed in both surface and detail and often contain urgent messages, interpreted in a surprising artistic cipher.

In his youth, he was influenced by the environment of the family's ceramics workshop but also by the colourful exotic butterflies in the collection of his grandfather, who had made a trip to South America in the 1930s. While studying at high school, he visited exhibitions of Bohumil Kubišta (1960) and, influenced by his paintings, created the expressive Self-Portrait (1964). His early paintings, which the artist described as "Indian Baroque", are characterized by totemic shapes, personifying the mysterious myths of ancient exotic civilizations. The magical ornamental fantasy of Lamr's paintings springs from somewhere in the darkness of human cultural history, and the painter co-created it with his imagination, as if it were not only an artistic but also a spiritual drug. These ornamental symbols from 1966 to 1967, which are often composed symmetrically to a central axis, have the character of hallucinatory revelations. The paintings are darkly transparent and mostly monochromatic blue, and are strikingly at odds with Lamr's other work, but the prosaic reason was the lack of funds, which then sufficed for only one painter's paint.

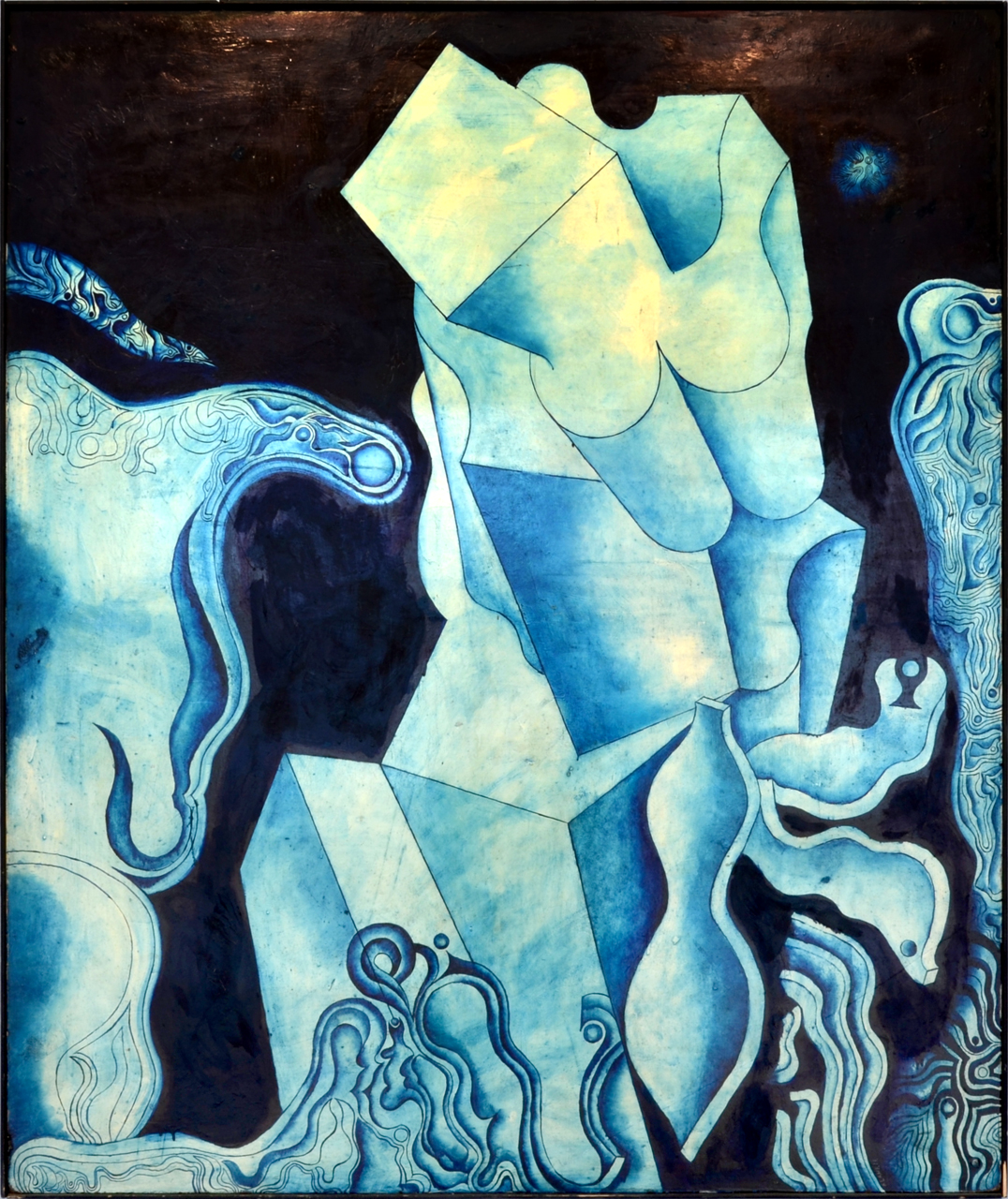
Stone Haberdashery (1966)

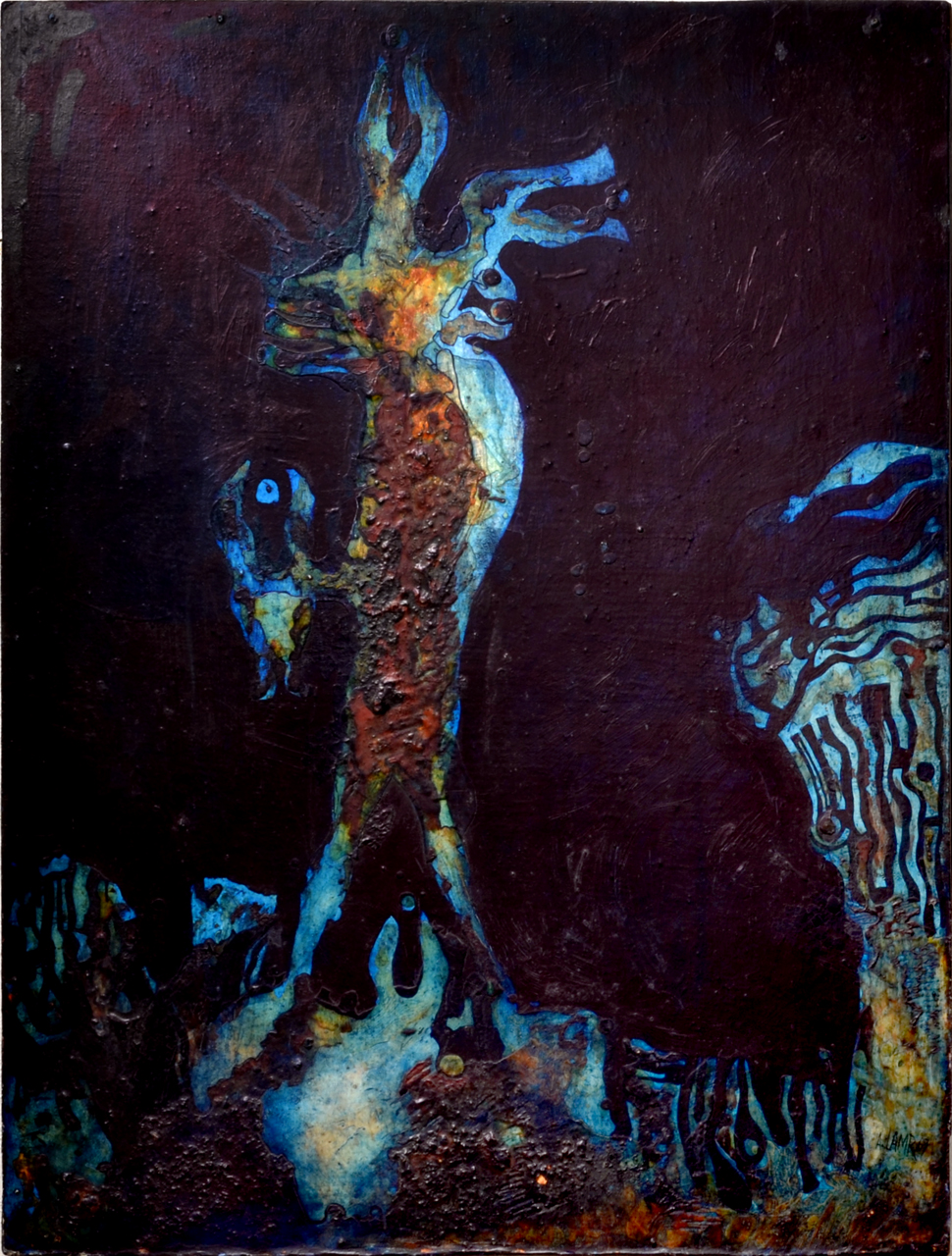
Walker (1967)

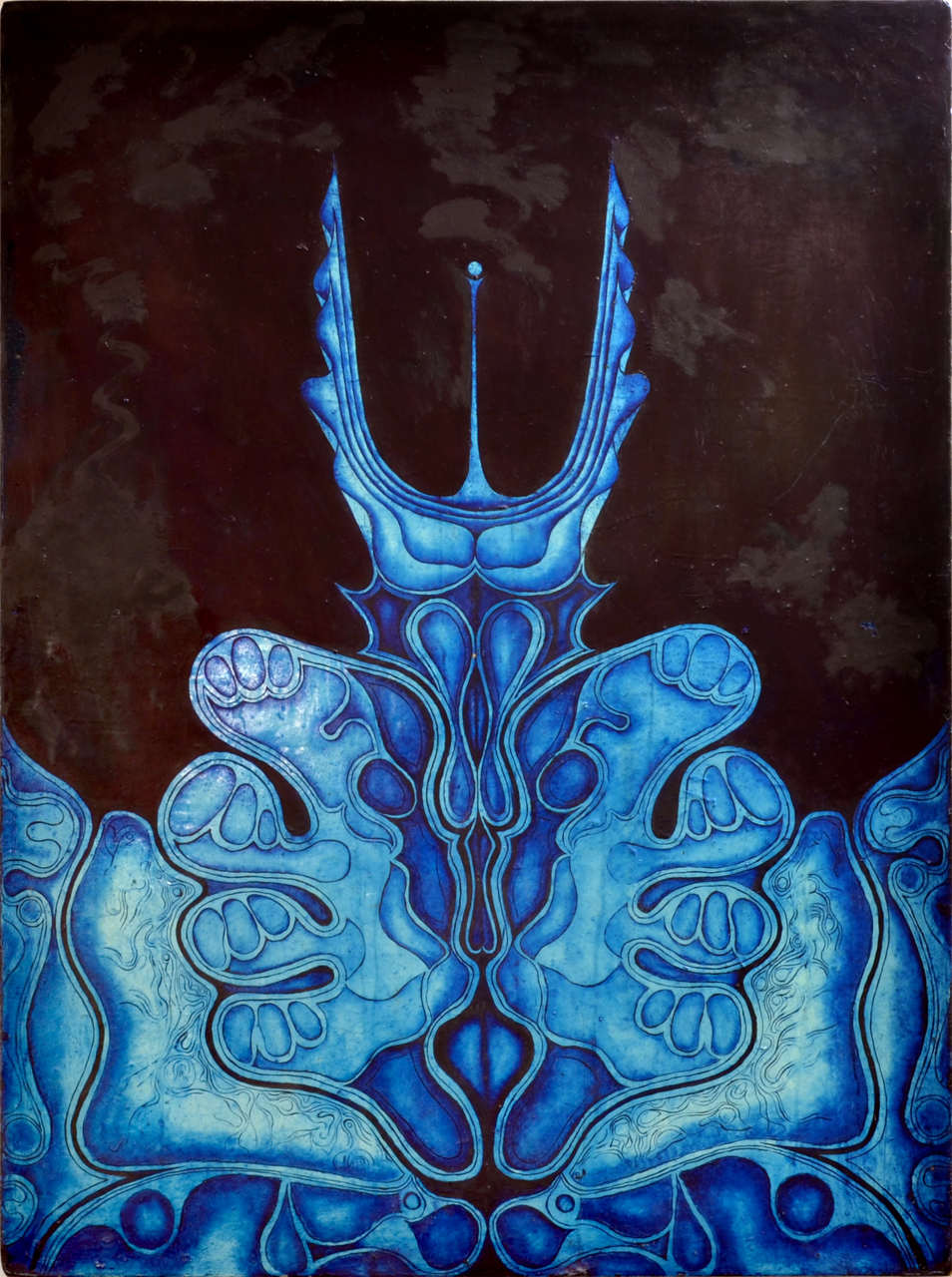
Pearl oyster (1967)

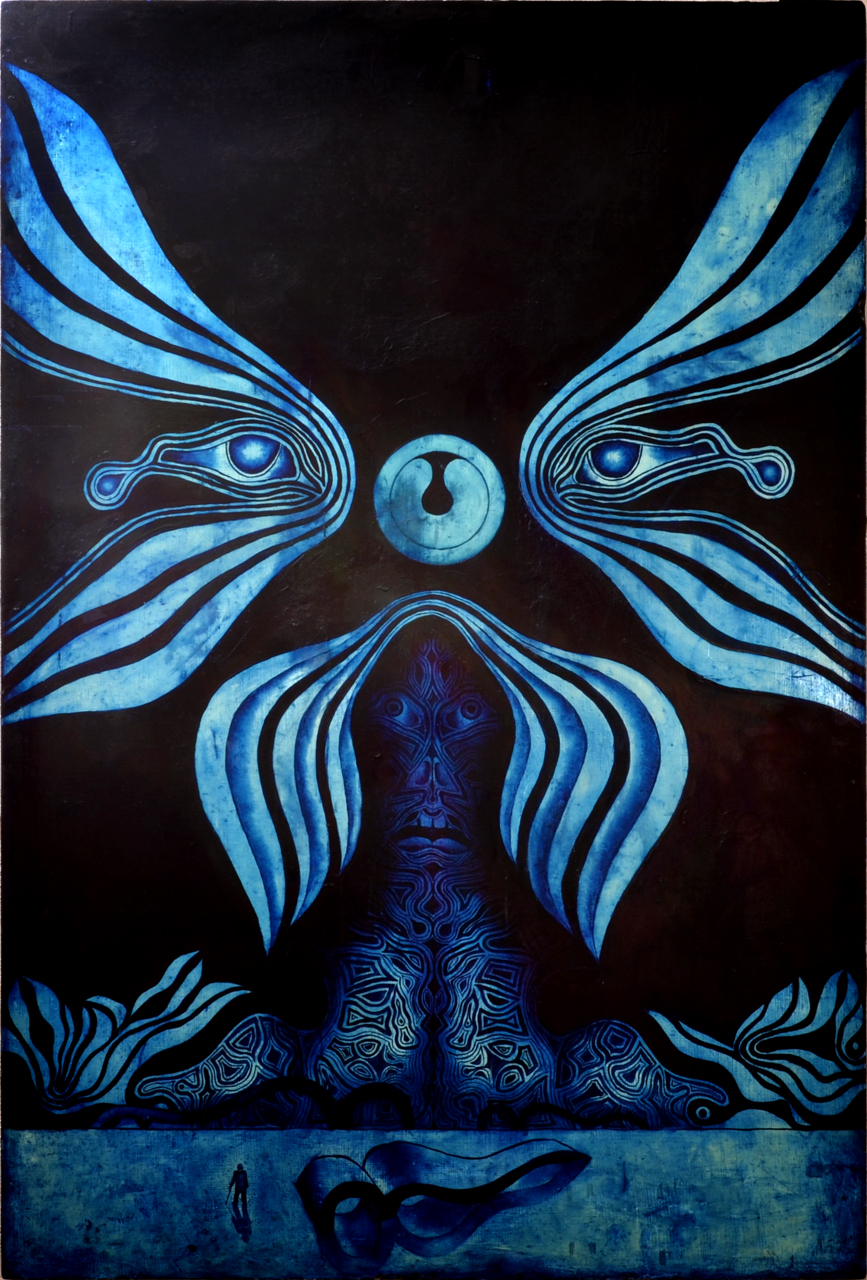
Moved Wig (1967)

During Lamr's military service, when he worked as an artist and was tasked with, among other things, designing posters, Lamr's artistic style changed. The mid-1960s in the Czech milieu are characterized by a growing polemic with abstraction and the actualization of various forms of figuration. At the end of the 1960s, Aleš Lamr adopted and interpreted the playful colourfulness of Pop art in his own way and picked up on the impulses of narrative figuration in an original way (exhibition at the Václav Špála Gallery, 1966, curated by Gérard Gassiot-Talabot), but he was also influenced by the legacy of domestic mannerism. He created a world of fancifully metaphorical narrative, which was based on the ordinary realities of contemporary life.

From the early 1970s, Lamr's artistic style was characterized by loose outline drawings of objects and figures, and surfaces filled with varied but harmoniously softened tones of acrylic paint that create a dynamic mosaic of shapes. The painter's training in spatial art is evident in his inventive work with the backdrops of the spatial plans of the painting, in which vivid movement takes place. The distinction between the shape of a concrete object derived from reality and a wholly abstract sign disappears, and the silhouette of the object and its internal structure merge seamlessly with the surrounding space through patches of identical colours.

If his paintings from the 1970s can be loosely classified with the "Czech Grotesque" and "New Figuration", they should also be placed in the context of the hilariously artistic grotesque of Californian "funk-art" or the playfully critical naïveté of the "Imaginists" from the Chicago area. Compared to American Pop art, with its flat graphicism and reportage-like matter-of-factness, the European "New Figuration" is characterized by a looser play with pictorial motifs. (Note: La figuration narrative: Continuous style, temporal juxtapositions, cloisonnés and polyptychs, itineraries and metamorphoses, Václav Špála Gallery, Prague 1966, curated by Gassiot-Talabot Gérald, Petrová Eva) Lamr combined this mannered dynamic shape metaphor with the narrative style he developed in the following years.

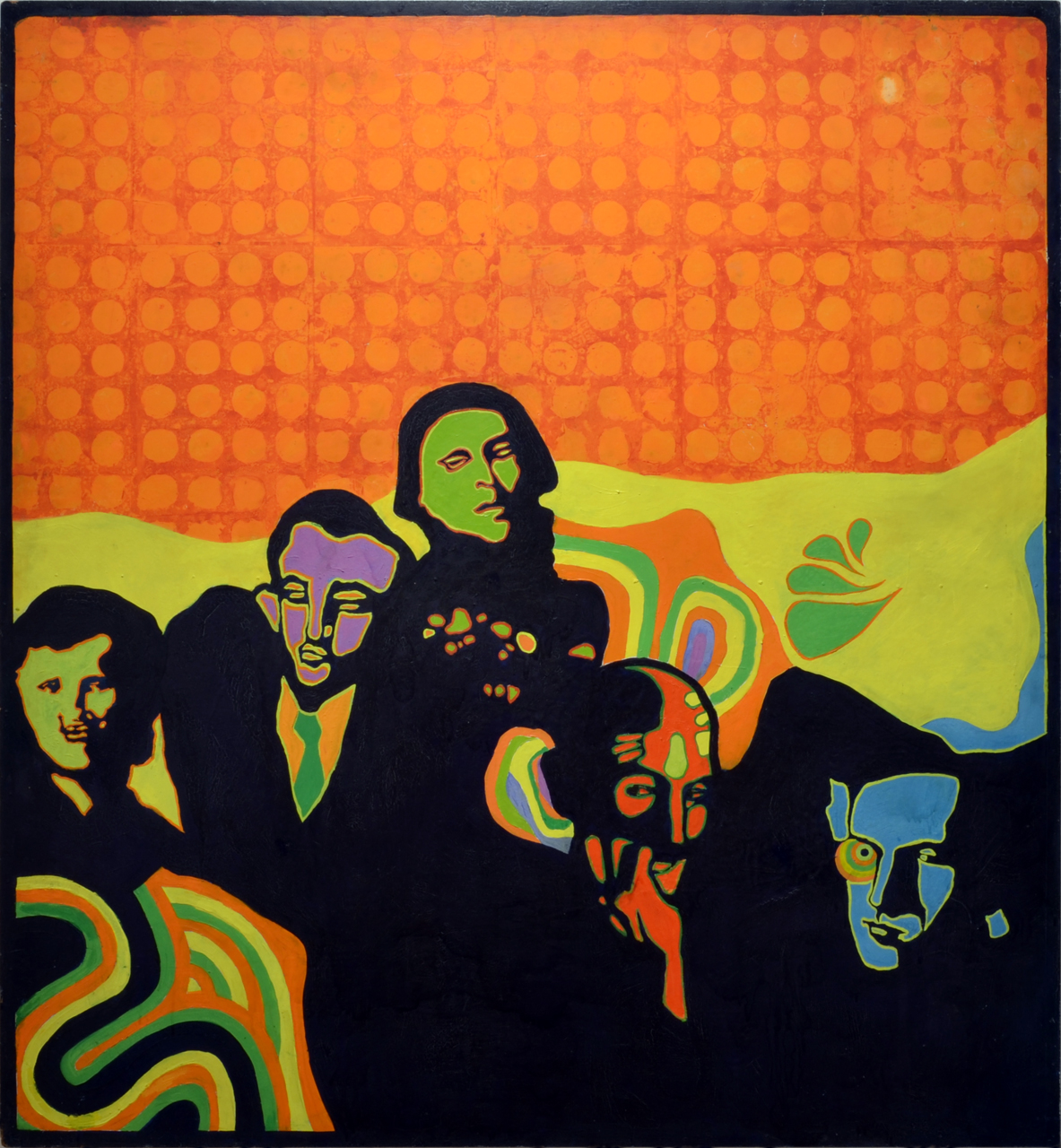
Friends (1968)

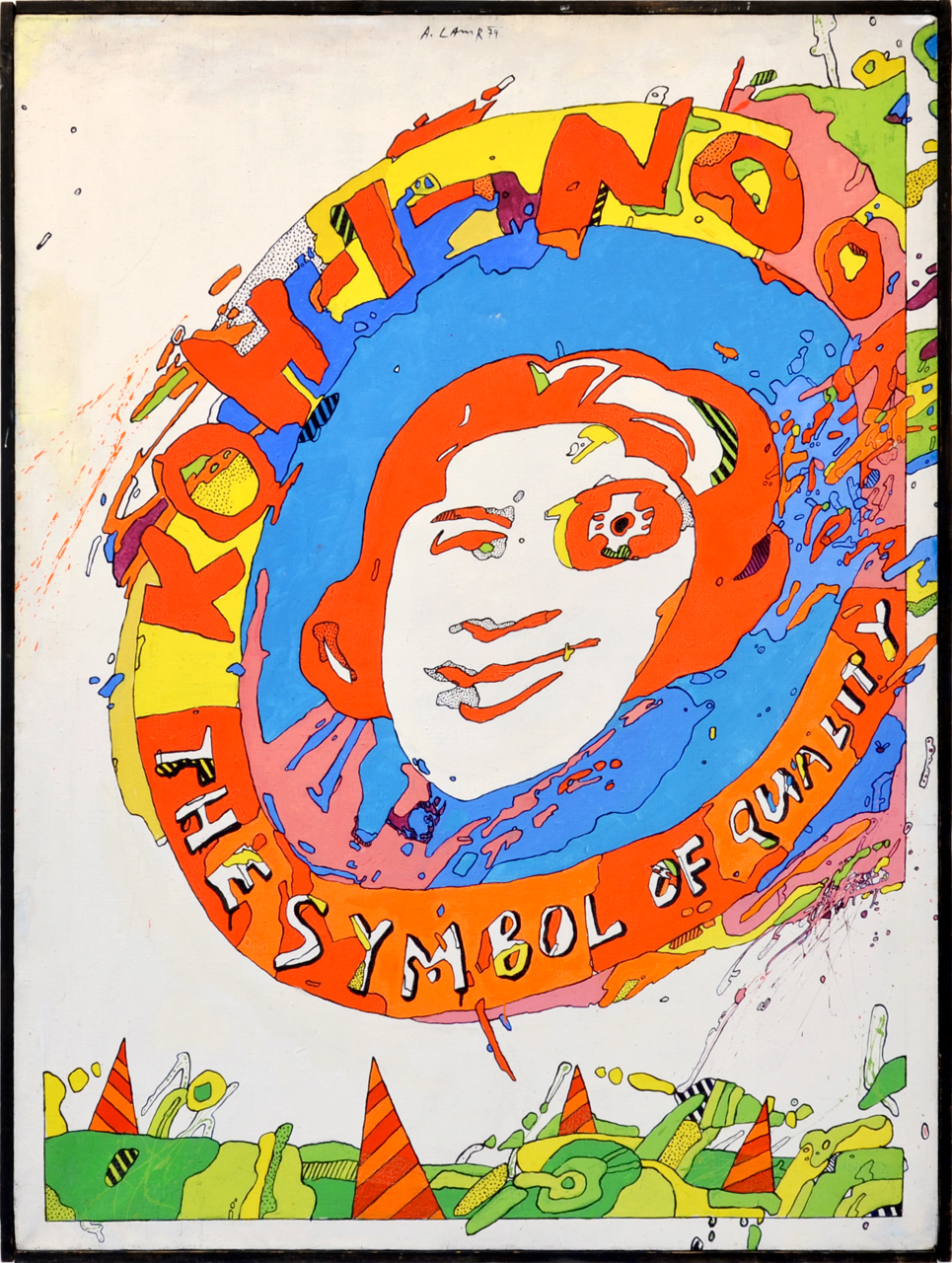
Tribute to František Kupka (1974)

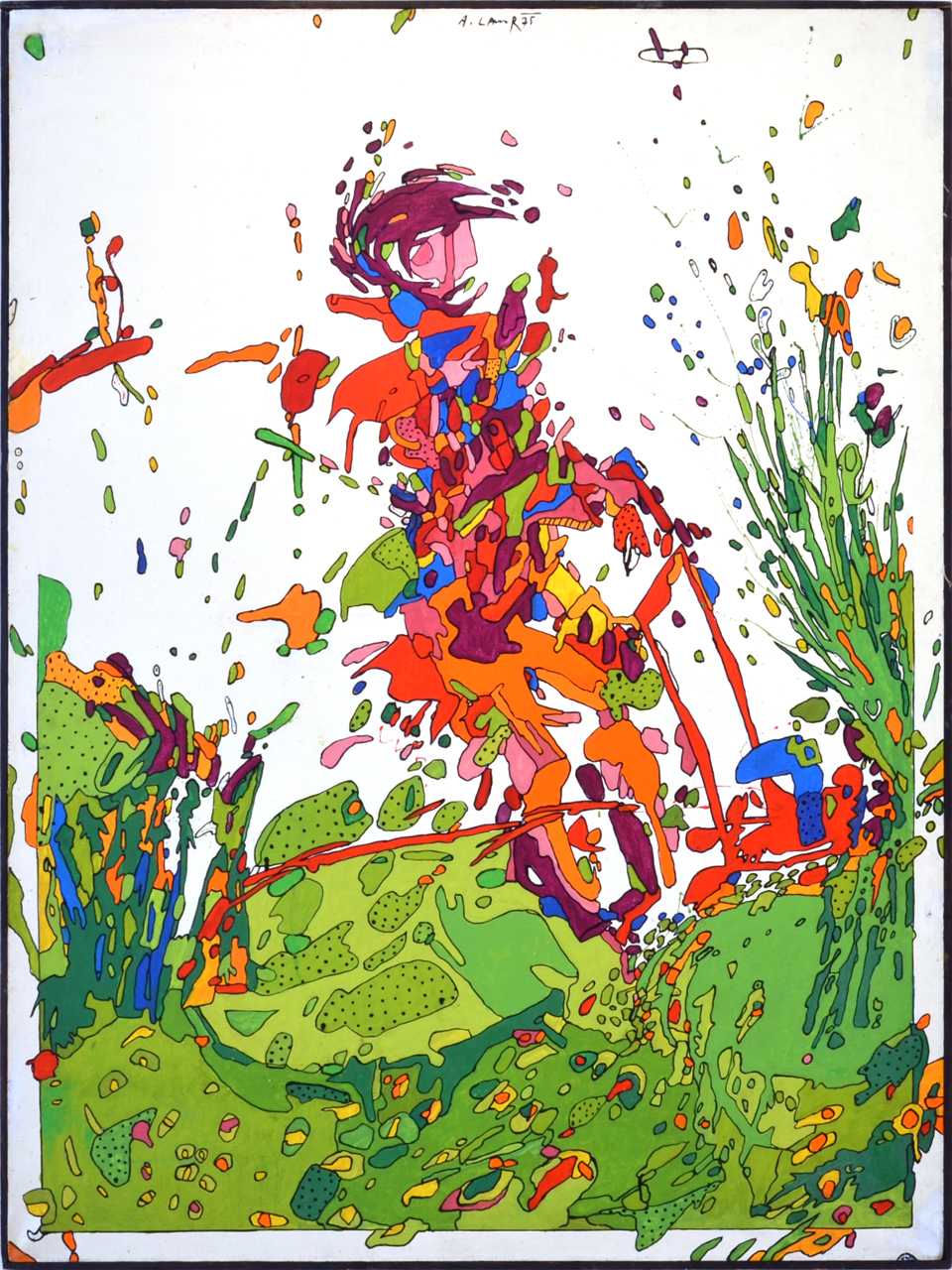
The Reaper (1975)

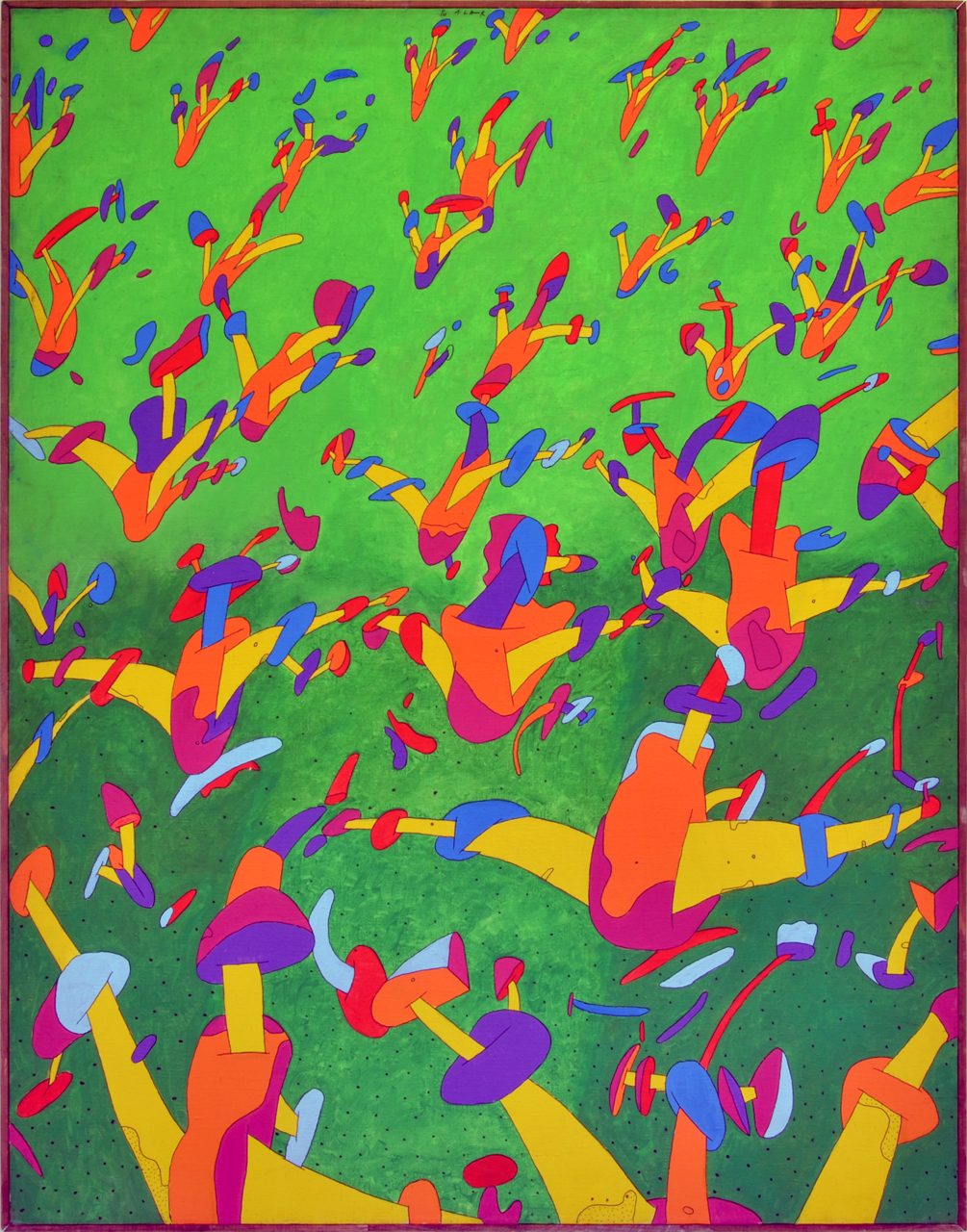
Landing from Tramtaria (1980)

The "New Figuration" movement and its specific existentially burdened offshoot, called the "Czech Grotesque", developed from the mid-1960s and continued through the period of normalization until the 1980s. The painters Jiří Načeradský, Jiří Sopko, Václav Mergl, Rudolf Němec, Zbyšek Sion, and the sculptors Karel Nepraš, Bohumil Zemánek, Karel Pauzer, and Hana Purkrábková were among its members. Some of Aleš Lamr's paintings from the 1970s have the character of an artistic gag. According to Václav Havel, a gag can be regarded as a specific case of the embellishment of the initial situation, consisting in its overturning and exposing the absurdity and absurdity, thus creating the actual meaning core of the gag. The playfully grotesque form of Lamr's ""New Figuration"", the spontaneous play with shapes and the joy of free white space continued the liberating optimism of the late 1960s and lightened the gloomy atmosphere of the occupation despair of the normalization years.

In the 1980s, when society's general weariness with the atmosphere of normalization was at its peak, a dark colour appeared in Lamre's paintings, from which a rainbow, star, spiral or cross emerged as colour symbols related to the sky rather than the earth. A serious element of deep personal faith comes into play, and this respect for spiritual values is associated with a heightened level of abstraction and a move towards aggregate symbolic forms with timeless validity.

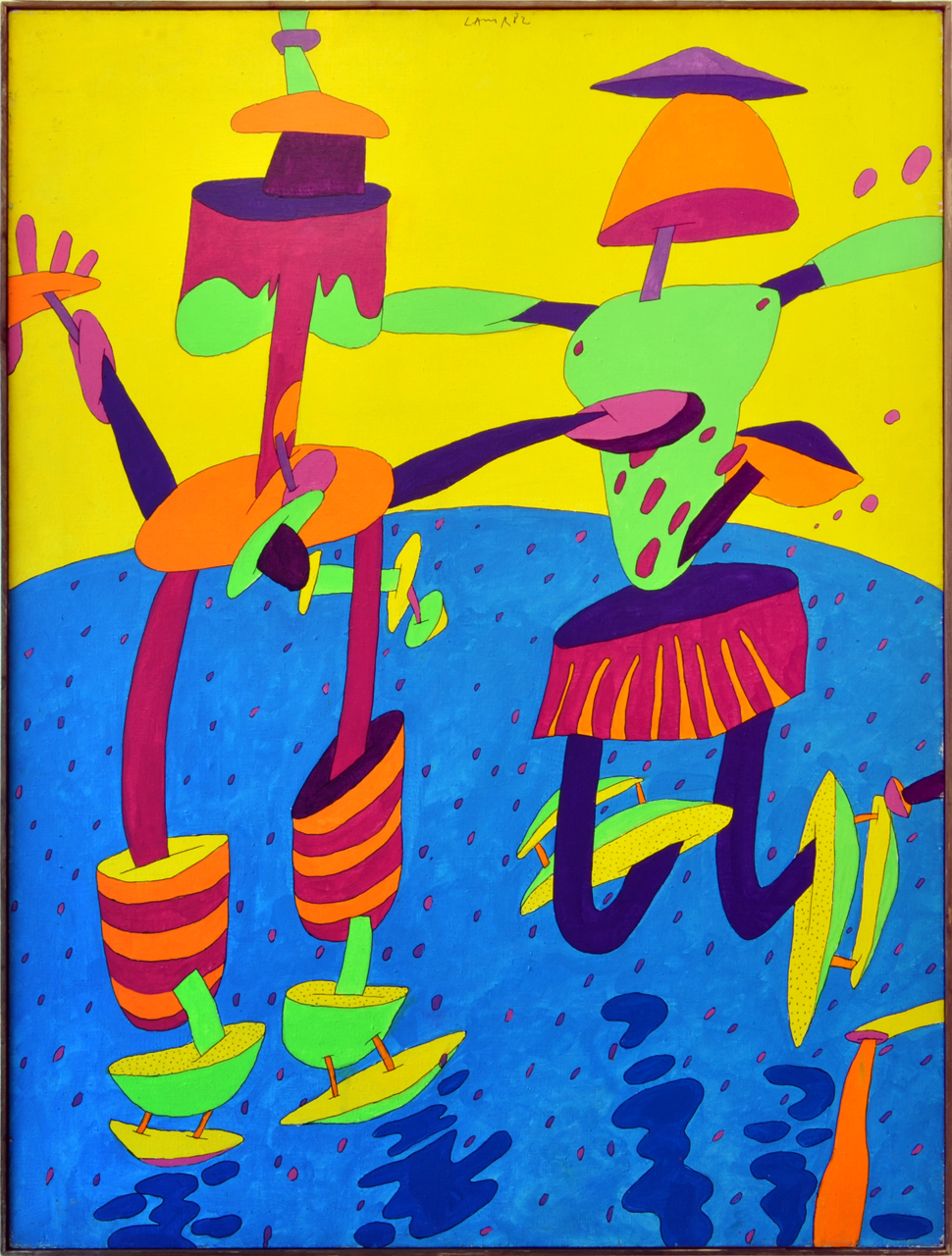
Gallant Skaters (1982)

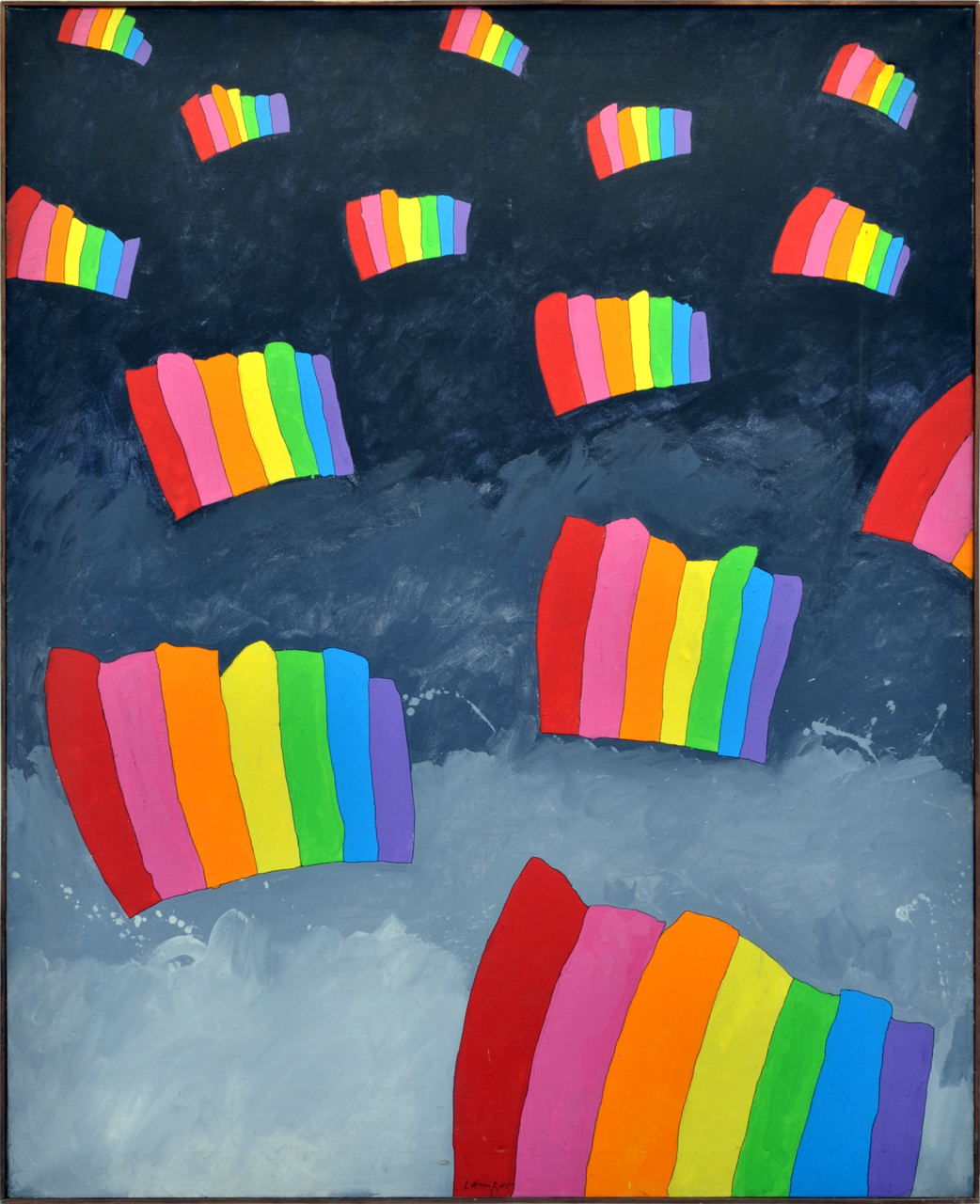
The Rainbow in Coke (1985)

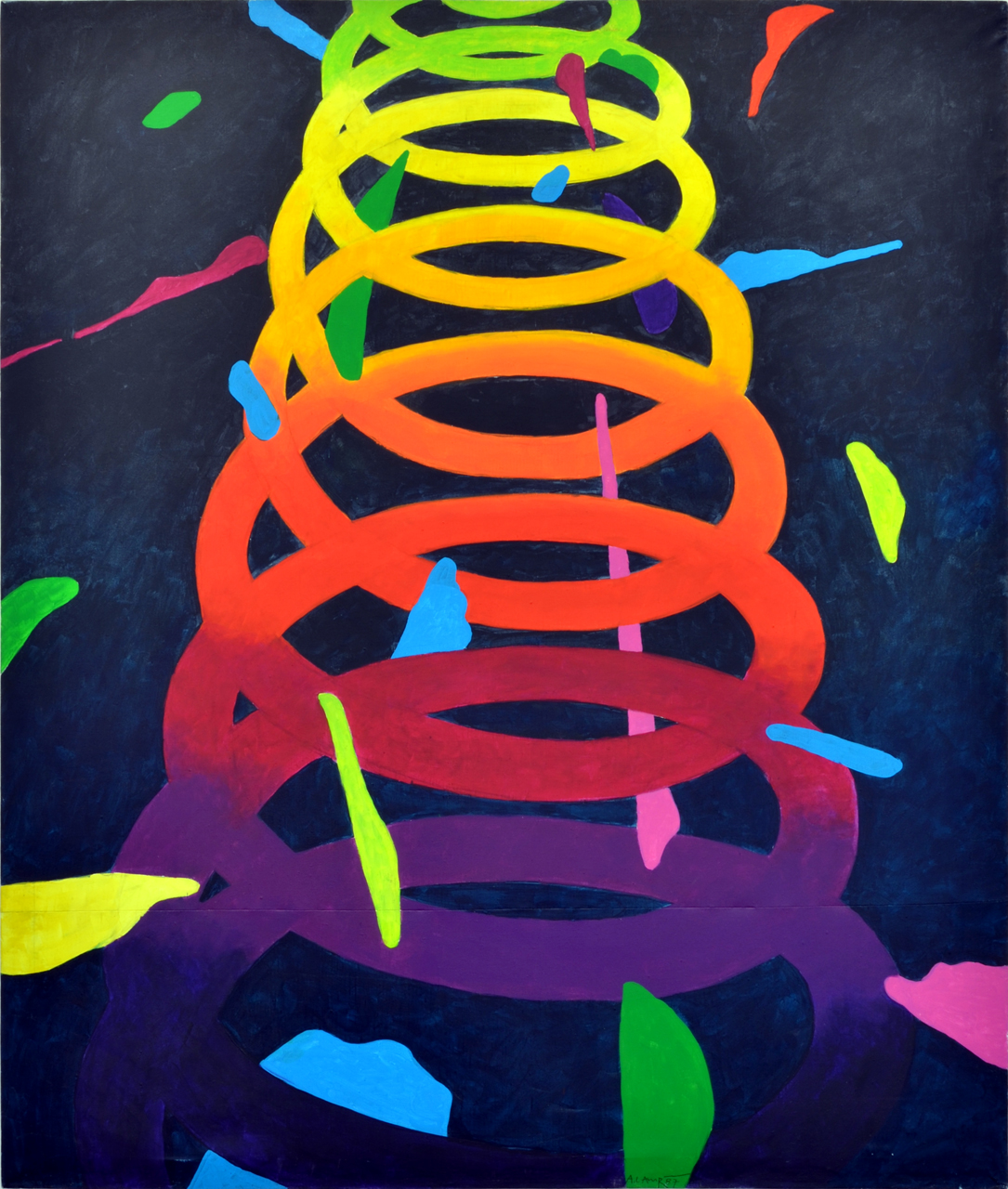
Journey to the Light (1987)

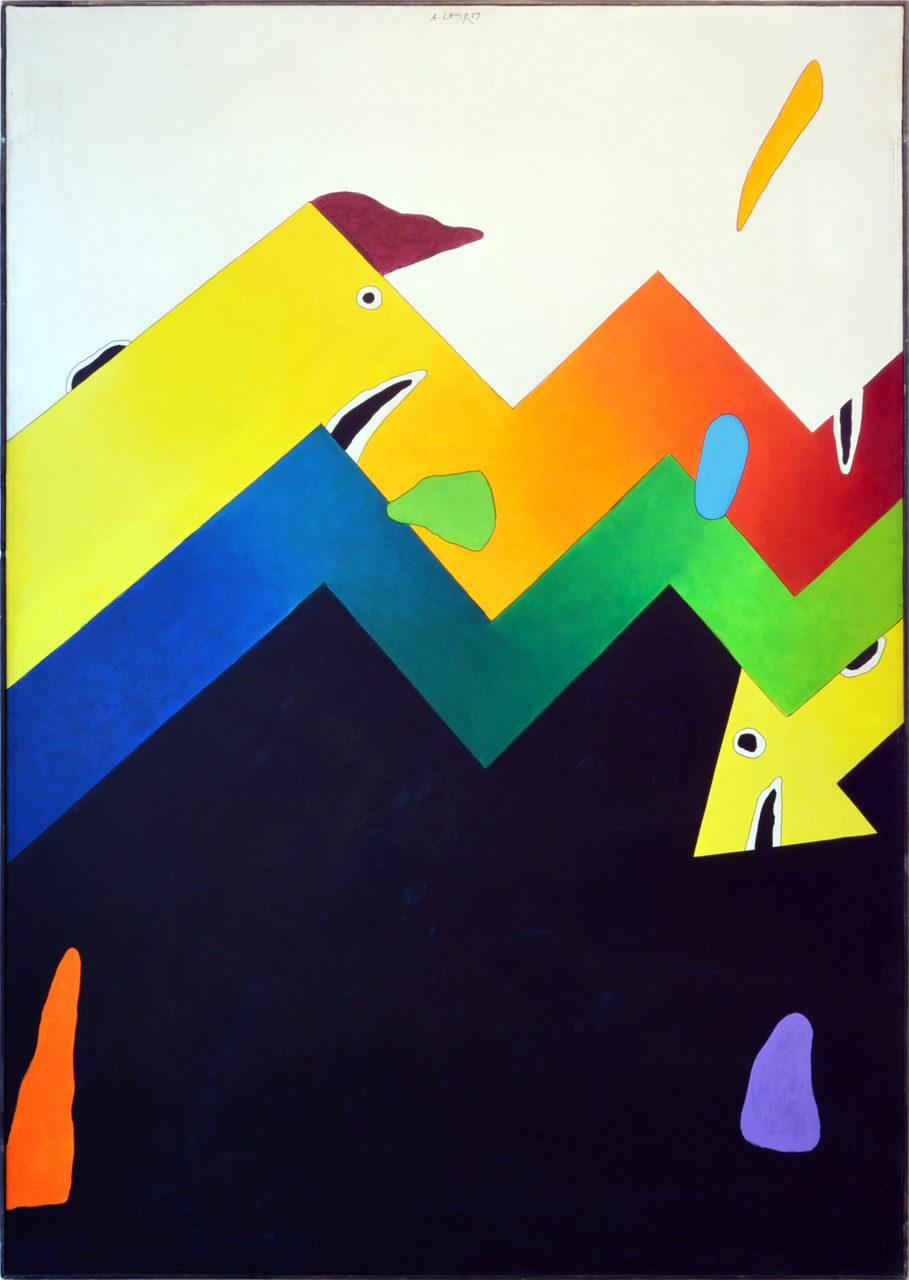
Lightning, Voices, Thunder (1989)

Lamr's painting after 1989 moved towards generalization and de-psychologization of content. Increasingly larger formats display the grace of geometric and anarchically abstract configurations, in which he seemed willing to show the viewer all the shape types that determine the synthetic nature of the world. Lamr's motto for the exhibition at the Prague Castle Ball Game Hall (2003), "The Spirit blows where it wills", taken from the Bible, fully expresses the lightness and playful imagination of his work after 2000. It is dominated by abstraction and the spontaneous gesture of painting, expressed by throwing paint onto the canvas, symbolizes the dynamics of the modern world and the liberating moment of the elemental joy of life.

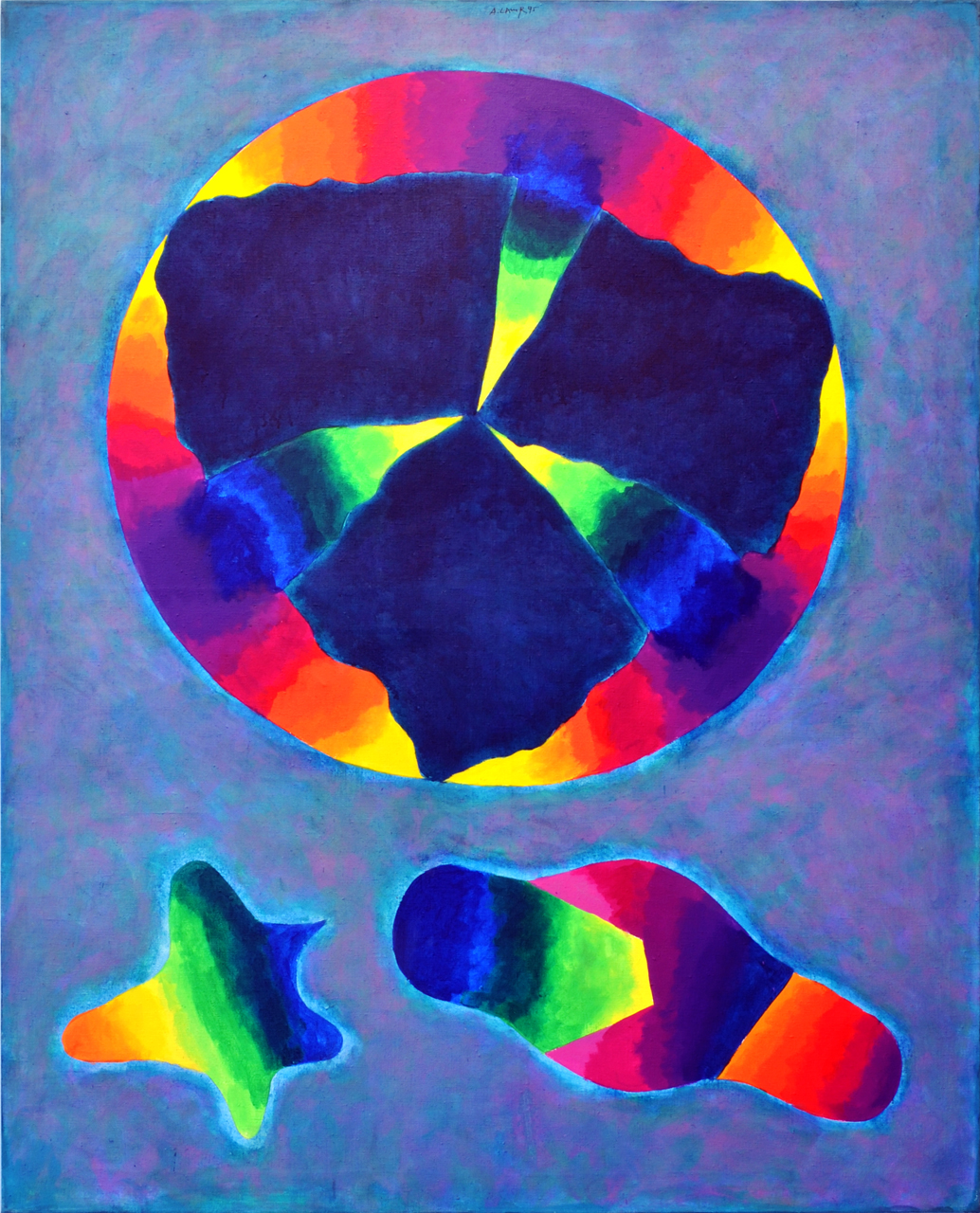
Revelation II (1995)

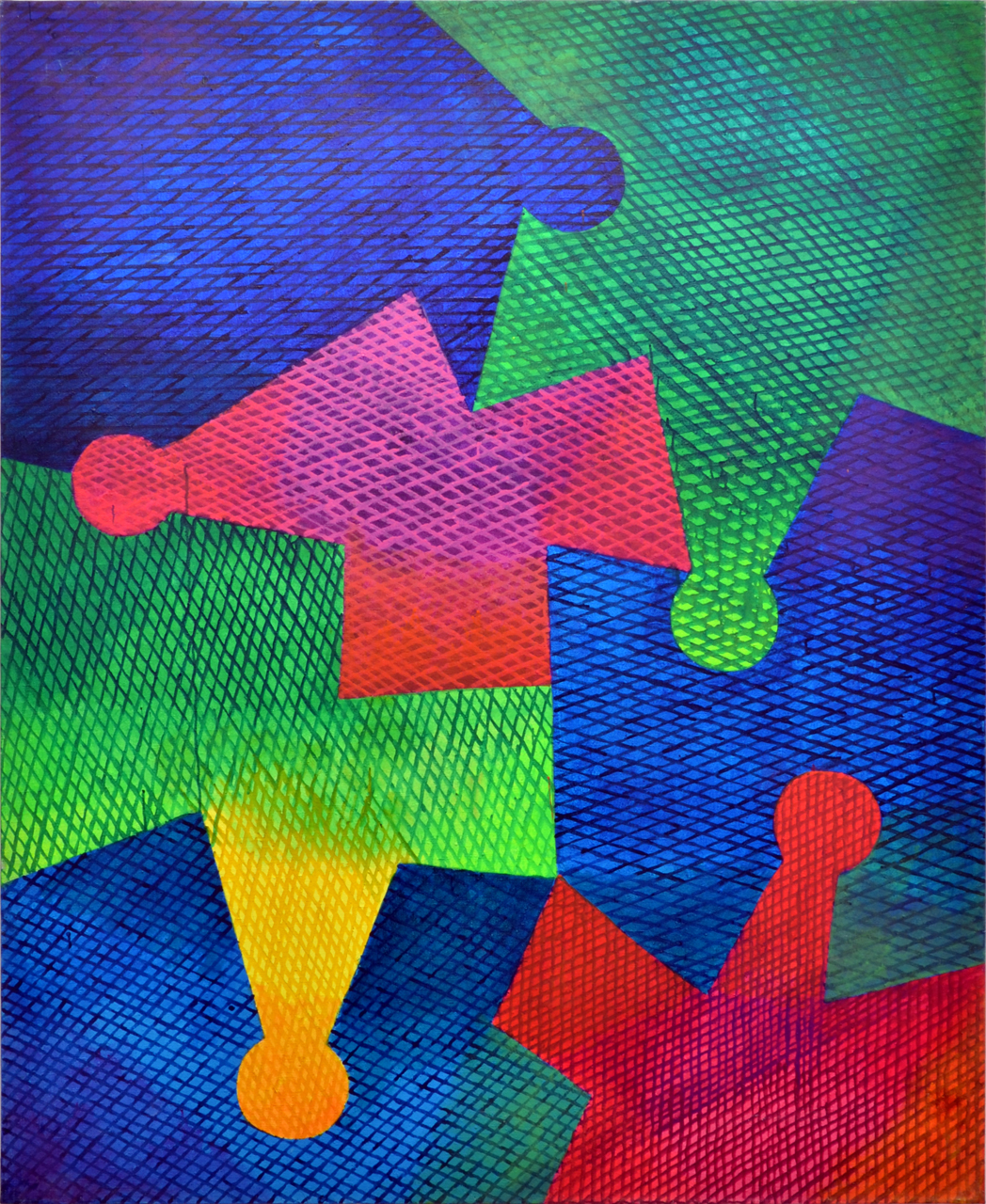
Tingling with Excitement II (2000)

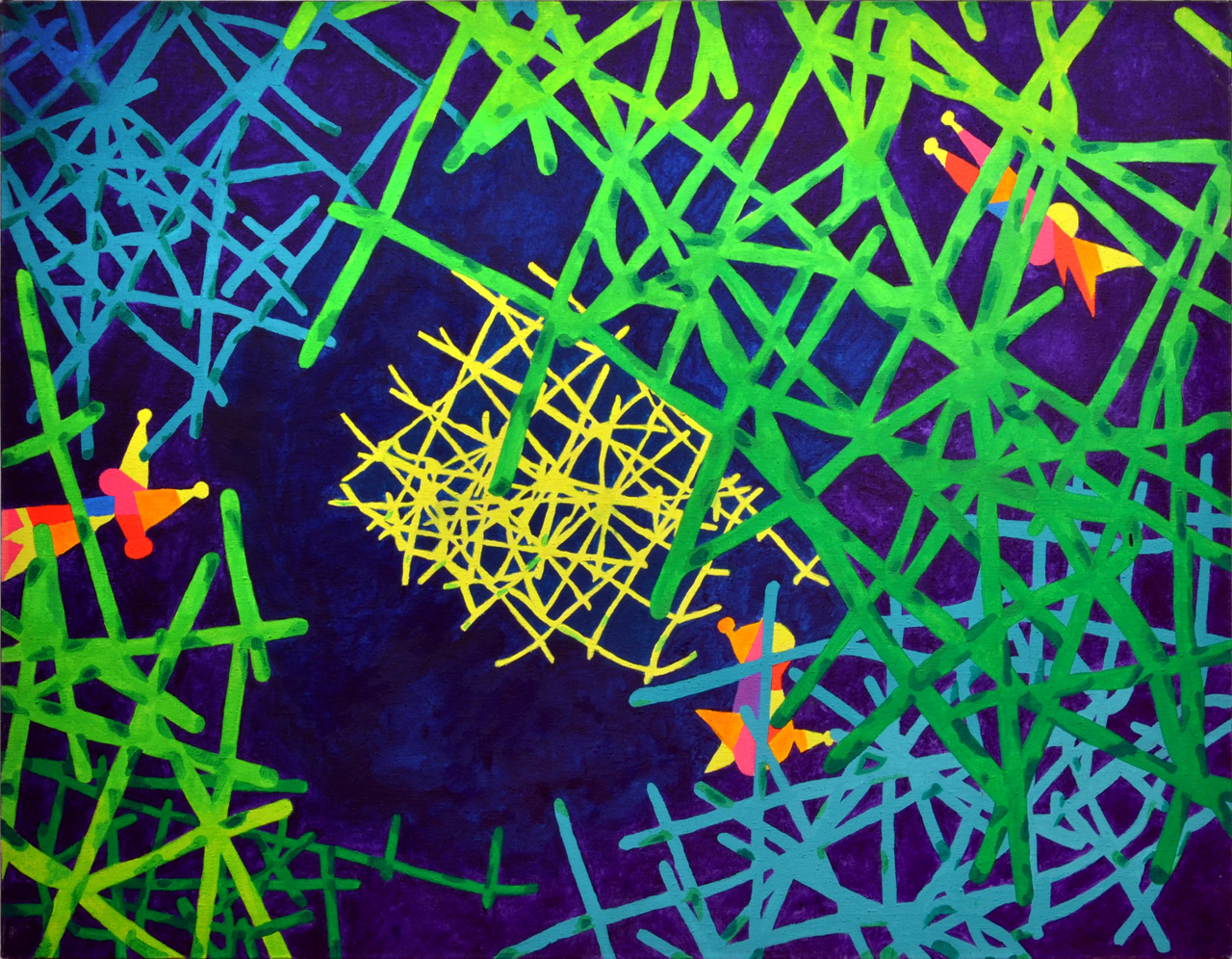
Hummingbirds in the Rainforest (2006)

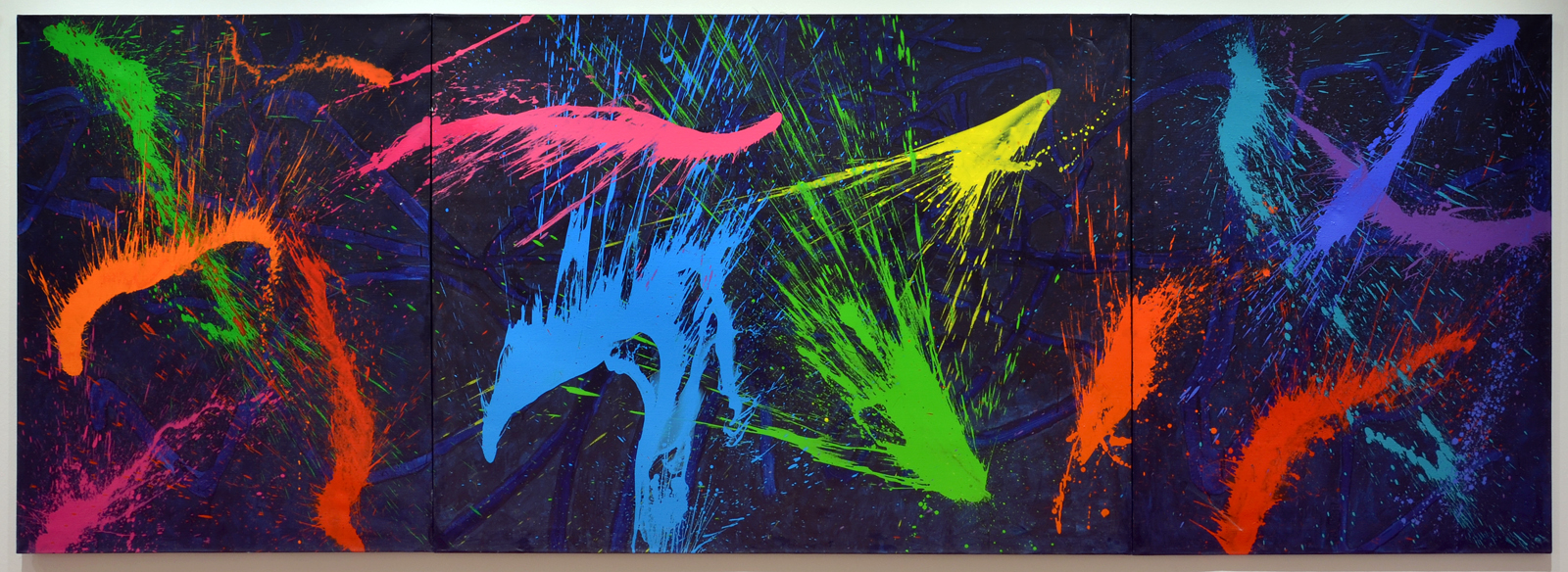
Paris triptych (2010)

Lamr also used colour dripping, using bright acrylic paints and composing collaged paintings from their fragments. In a series of abstract paintings entitled Maranatha (2015), (Note: Maranatha is a spiritual address from Aramaic: Our Lord Come) he opened up the pictorial space to randomness, sometimes with the intention of juxtaposing disparate abstract expressions. The result is a playfully optimistic game in which the painter sees a way to understand the creative genius of creation (Note: Pierre Reverdy: A painting is a pure creation of the spirit) and Creation myth. The titles of the abstract paintings painted in acrylic loosely refer to specific sources of inspiration (Red Hair, 2016, Pink Promenade, 2016, Rasputin, 2016), but in fact express the need to capture the essence and meaning of the paint itself. After the previous series, Aleš Lamr gradually returned to figuration (New Women, 2016). He used the technique of collage, cutting out silhouettes of female bodies from scraps of flats of coloured acrylic paint, combining them in playfully erotic and dynamic compositions of female athletes or dancers. Some paintings paraphrase classical themes (Master and Margaret, 2013, Leda and the Swan, 2014, Apollo and Marsyas, 2015). Lamr activates some aspects of his early work and reflects on the growing feminine element of the contemporary world, which, in addition to being poignantly engaging, invites deeper reflection.

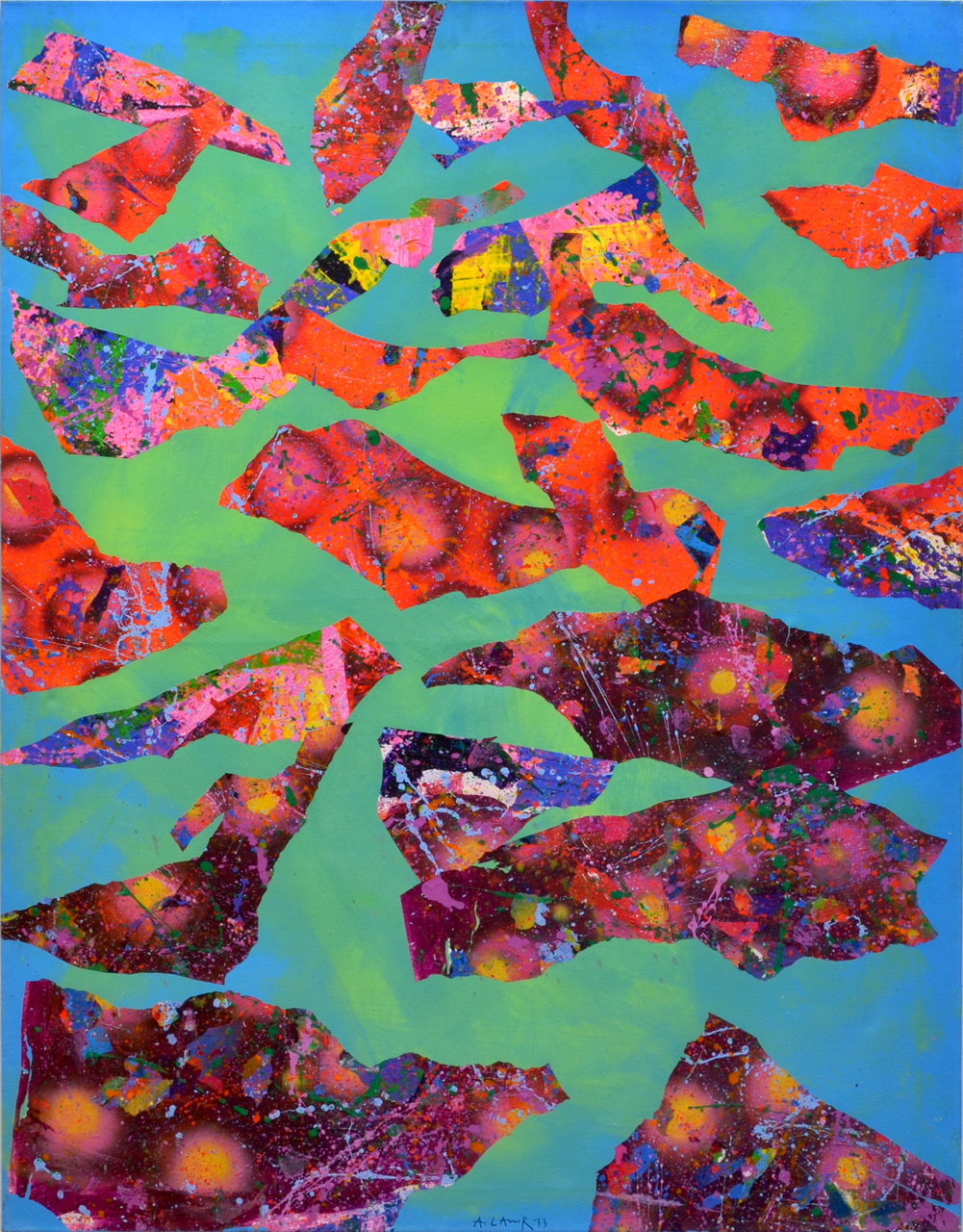
Torn Colours (2013)

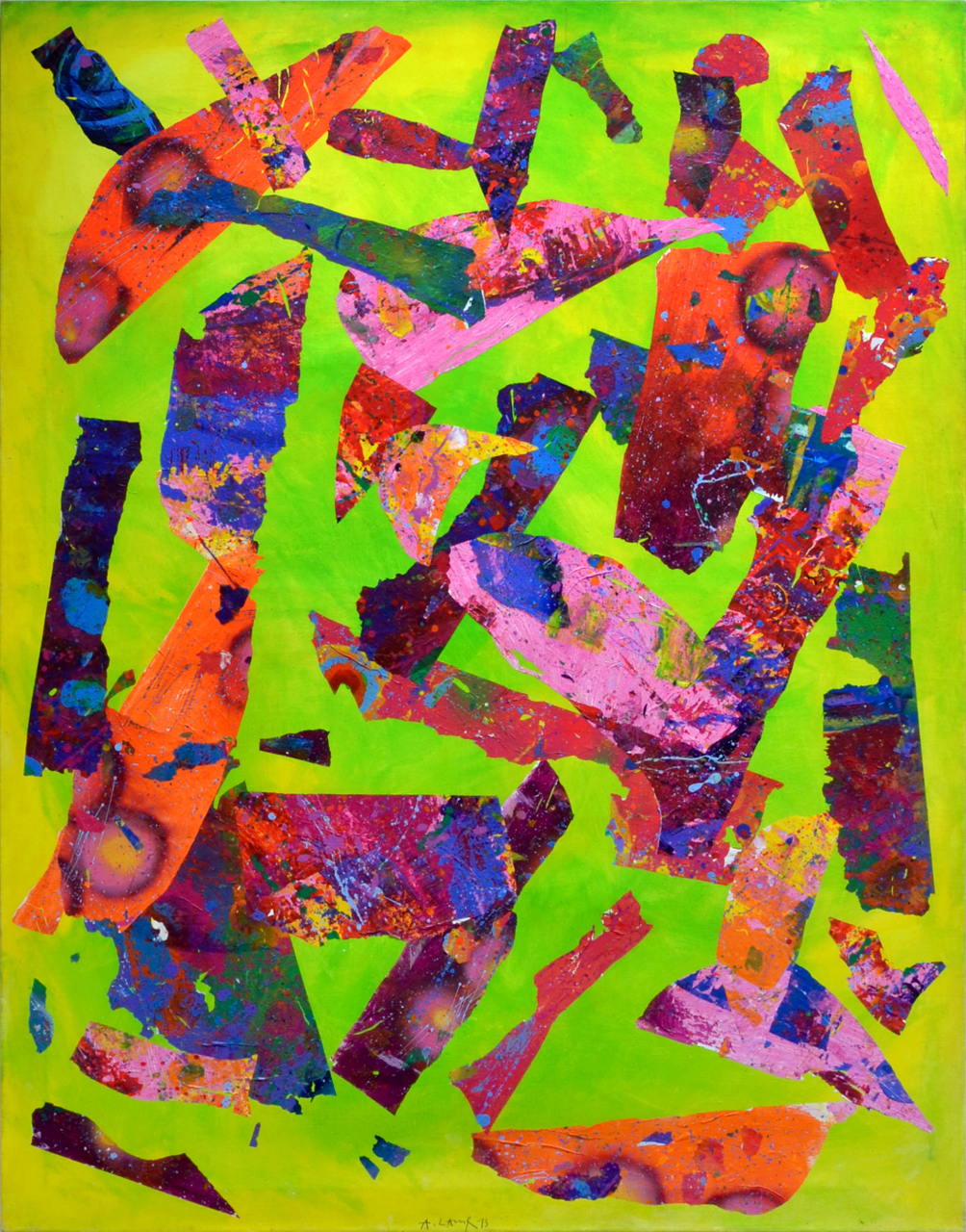
Inside Colours (2013)

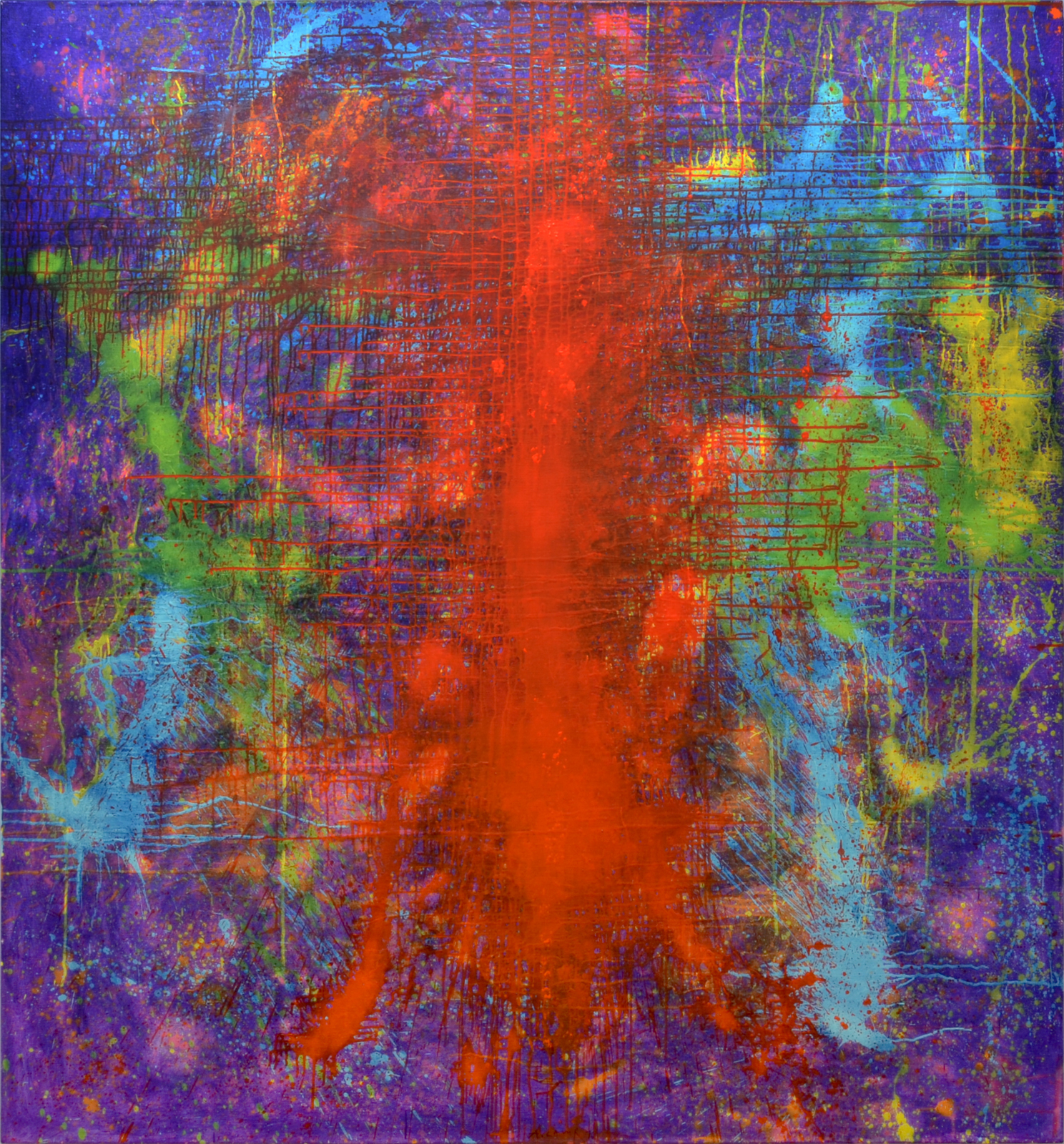
Apollo and Marsyas (2015)

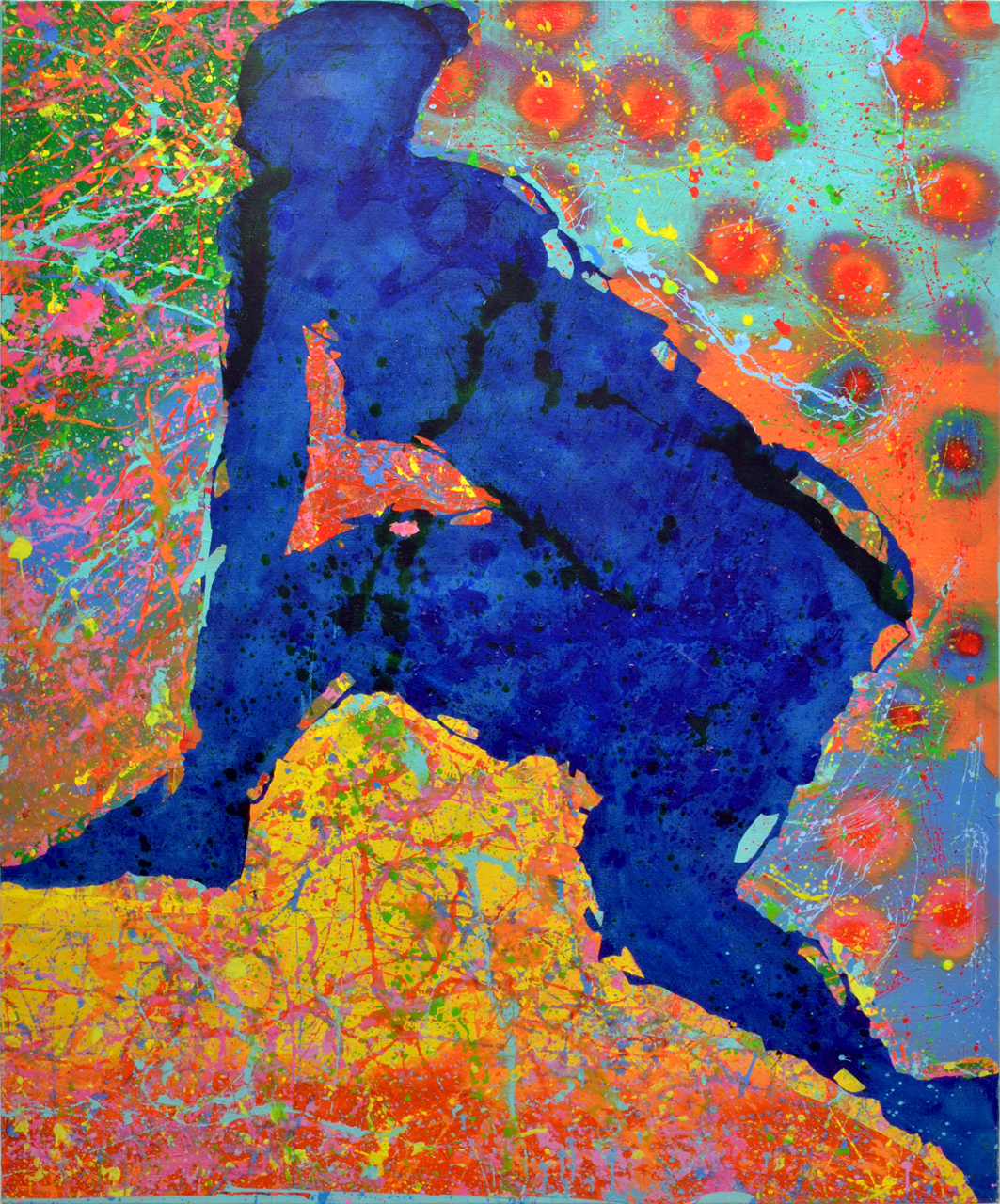
Blue Venus (2015)

=== Lithography ===
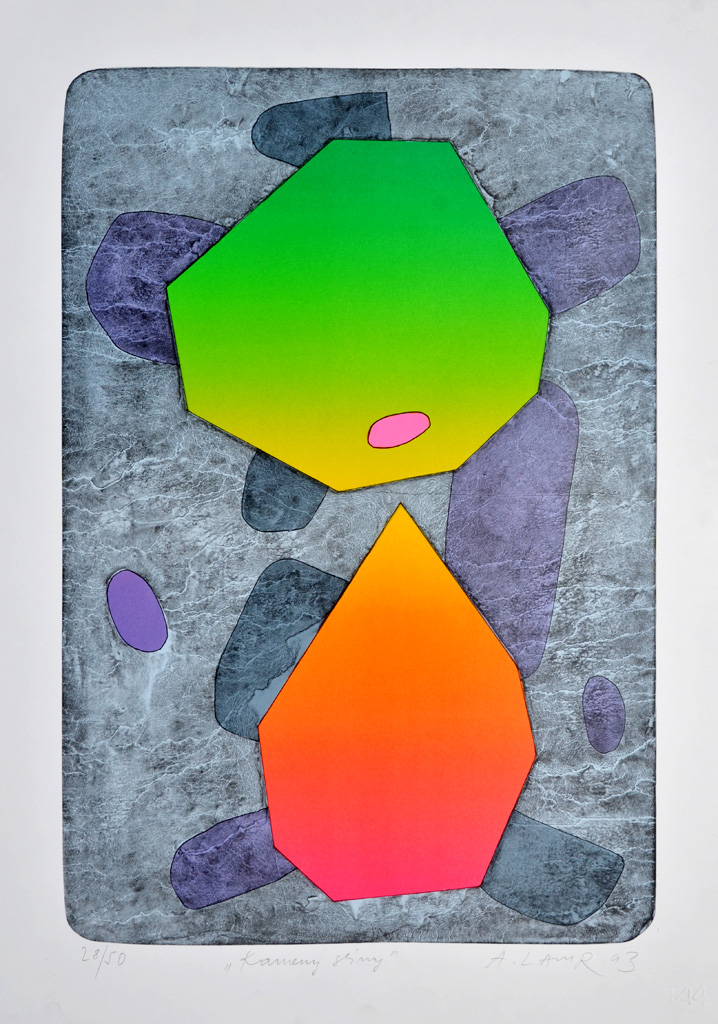
Stones-Shadows, lithograph 59 x 39,5 cm, 1993

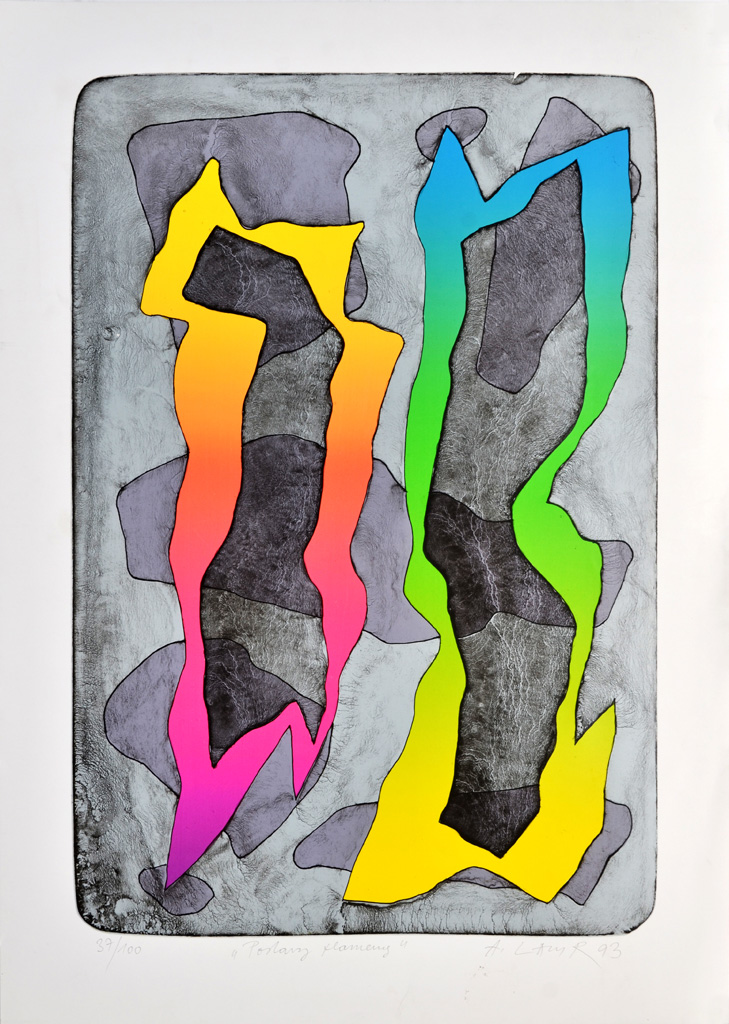
Figures-flames, lithograph 59 x 39,5 cm, 1993

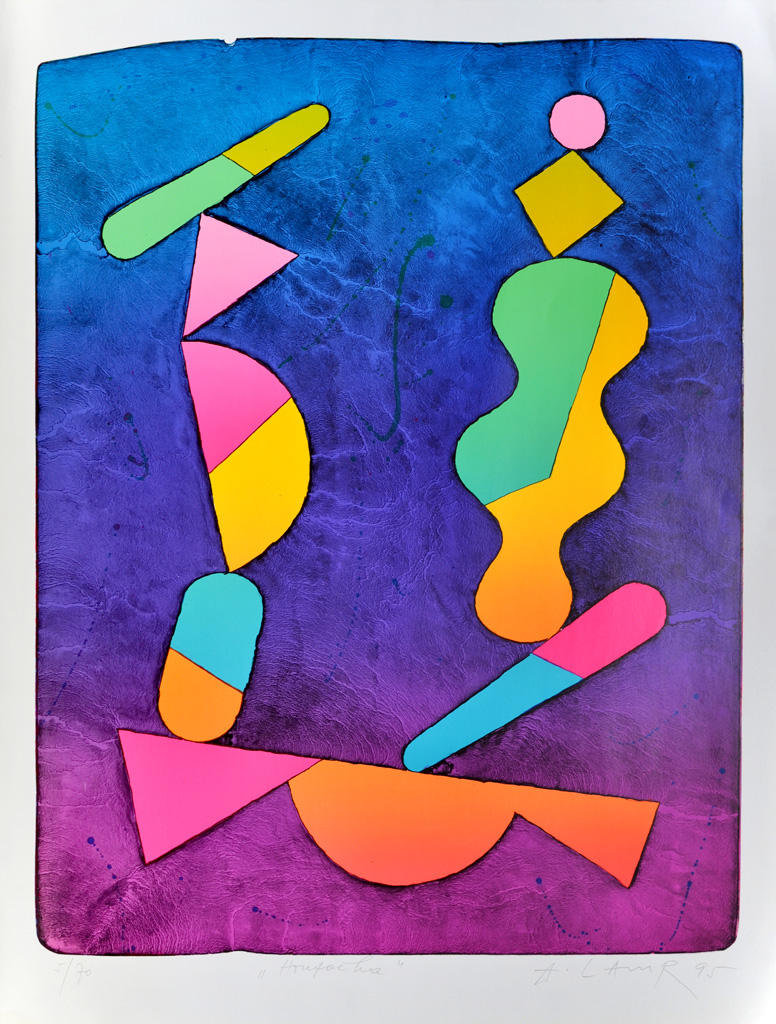
Swing, lithograph 70 x 54 cm, 1995

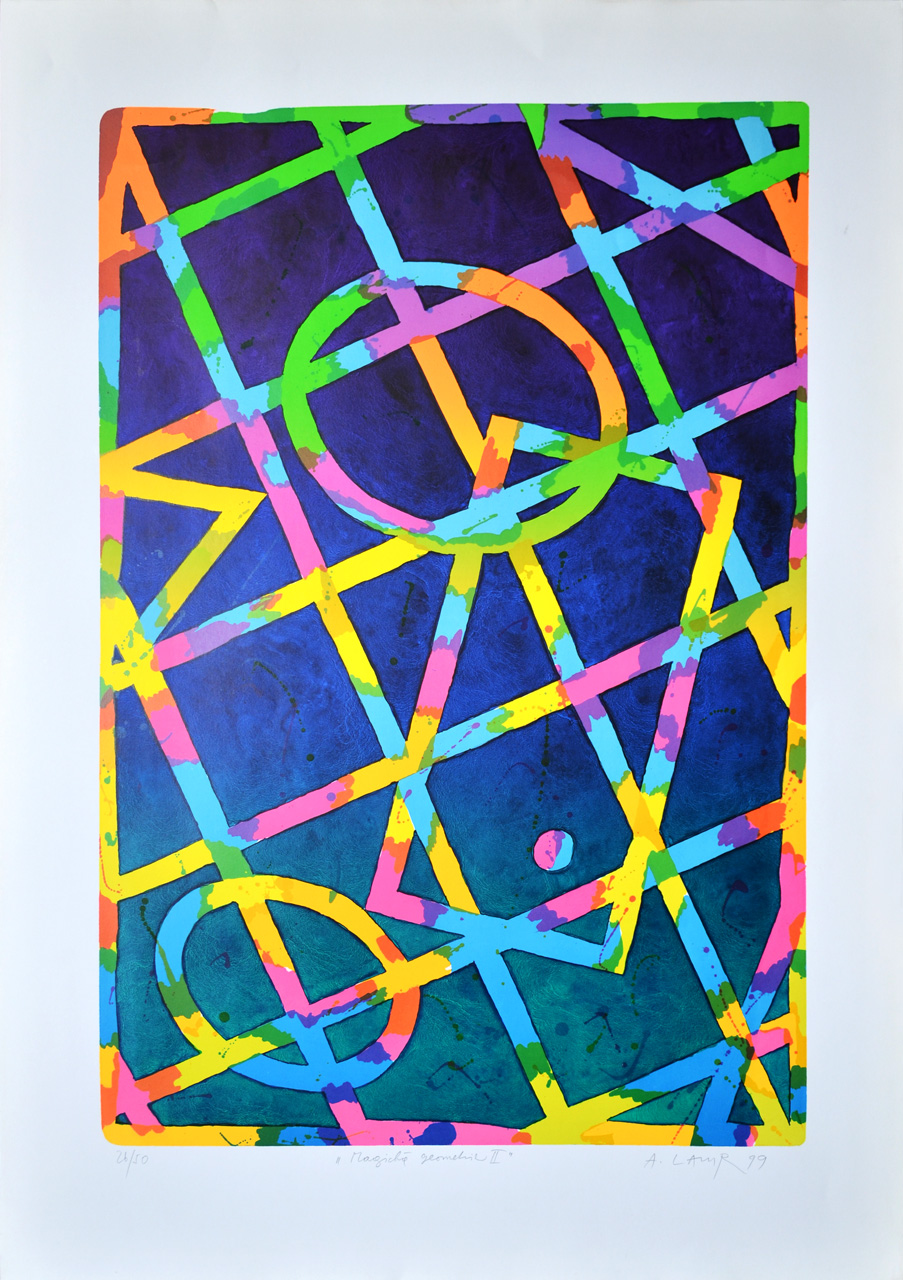
Magical Geometry, lithograph 81 x 55 cm, 1999

=== Sculpture and ceramics ===
After graduating from art school, Aleš Lamr felt that he had mastered drawing and painting well and was more attracted to artistic expression in spatial form. He failed the entrance exams for sculpture, yet throughout his life, in parallel with painting, he has been creating sculptures which are actually three-dimensional painting objects. From the classical figuration of the mid-1960s, when he worked in stone and bronze, he moved on to loose, colourfully polychromed and grotesque figures in wood, which are close in character to the life-celebrating and playful sculptural metaphors of Niki de Saint Phalle. His sculptures are mostly carved from a block of wood and supplemented with various protrusions (Striped Elephant, 1973) or assembled from flat parts (Jester and Queen, 1985). The series Heads (polychrome wood, 2015) forms a counterpart to the abstract paintings of the same period and is characterized by its playfulness and spontaneous color. The sculptor also works with ceramics and porcelain, decorated with coloured glazes. Some smaller porcelain objects were also cast in bronze.

The inclination towards the sculptural form follows Lamr's outdoor actions from the 1970s, and many of the sculptures have found application in architecture.

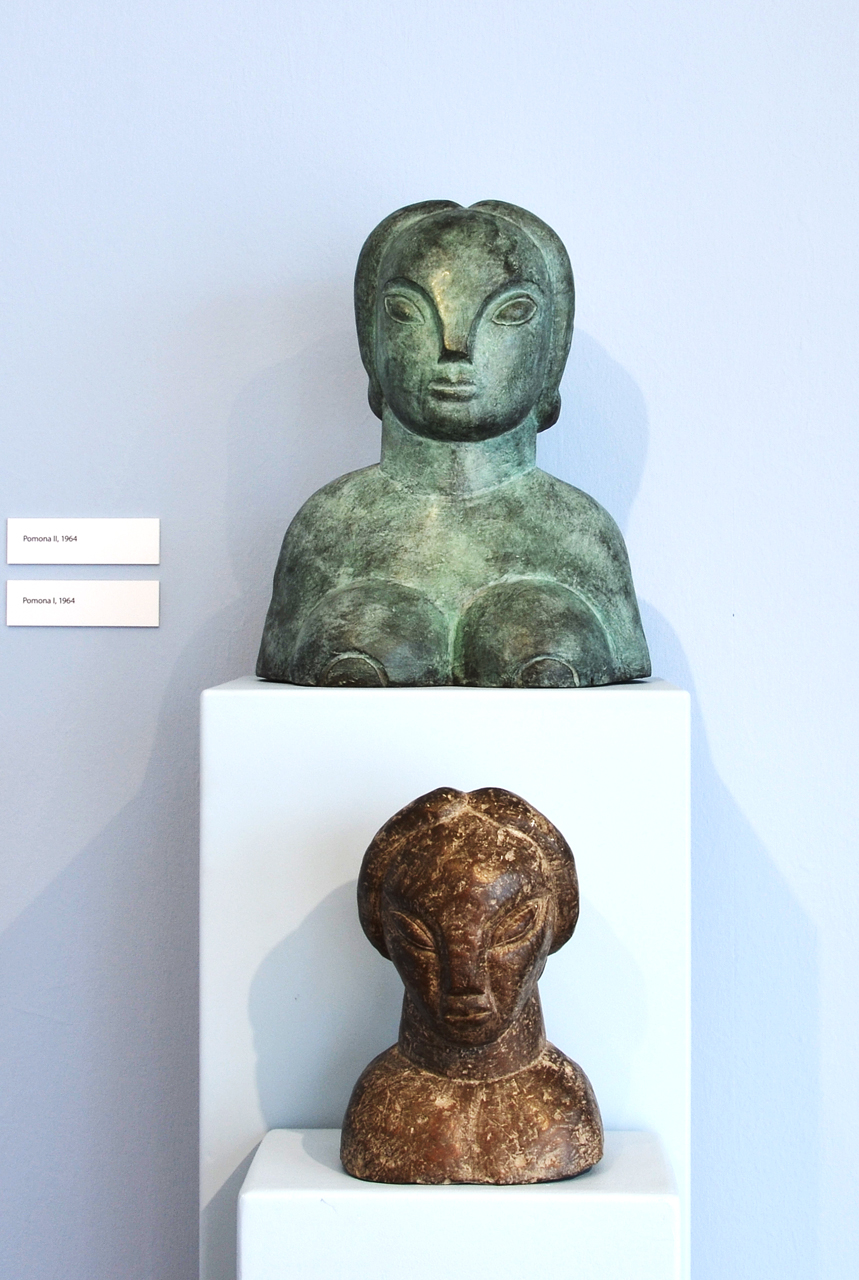
Pomona I and II (1964)

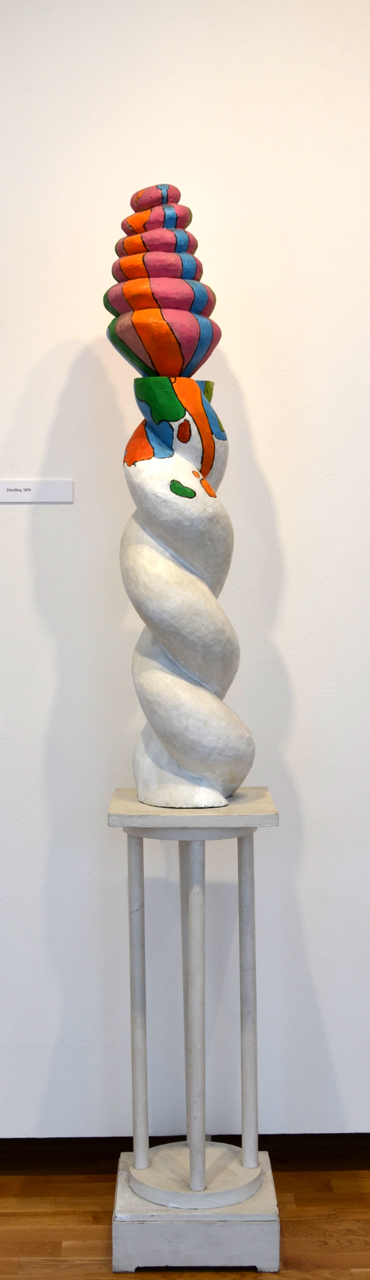
Ice Cream (1974)

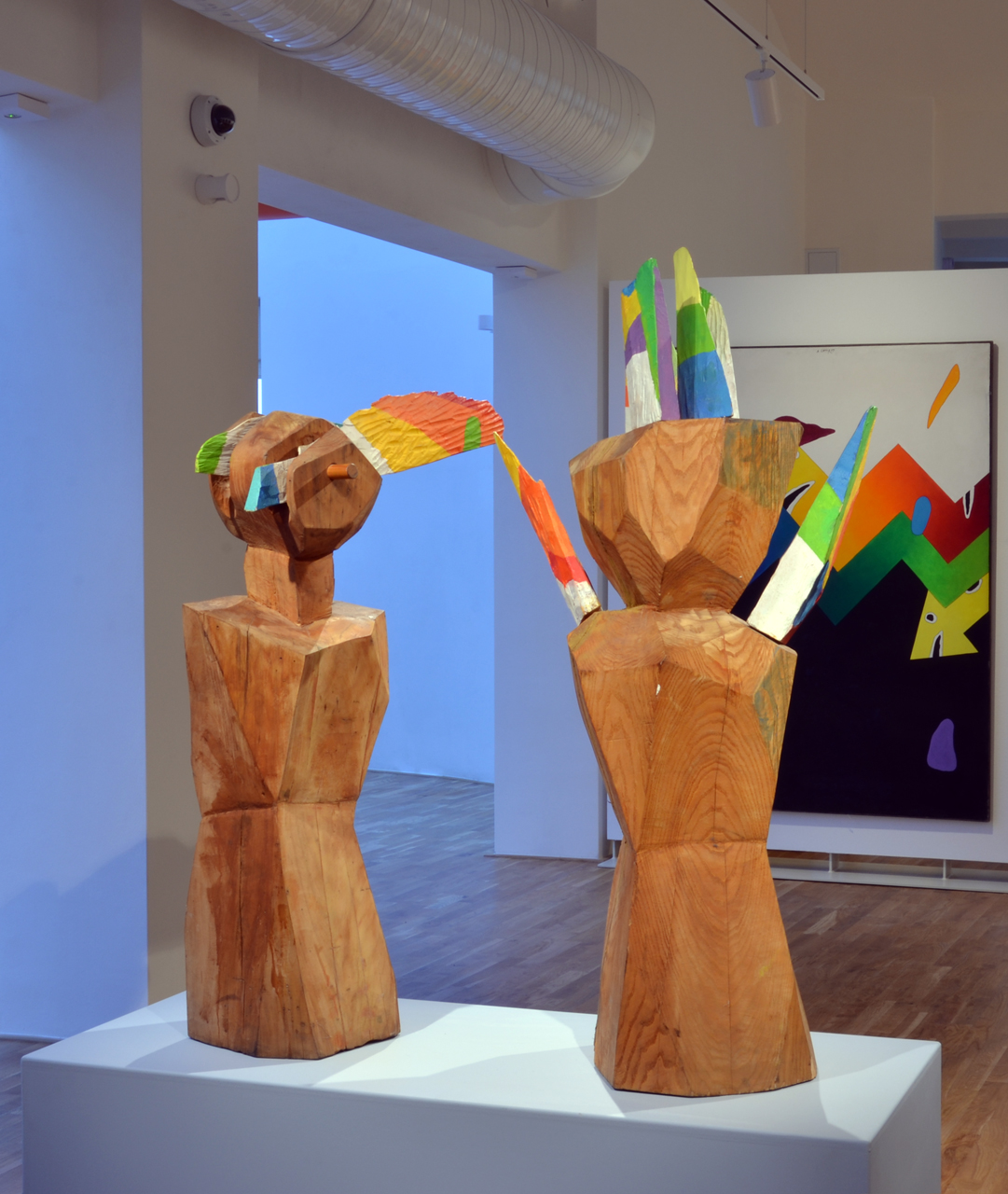
Cherub I and II (1991-1992)

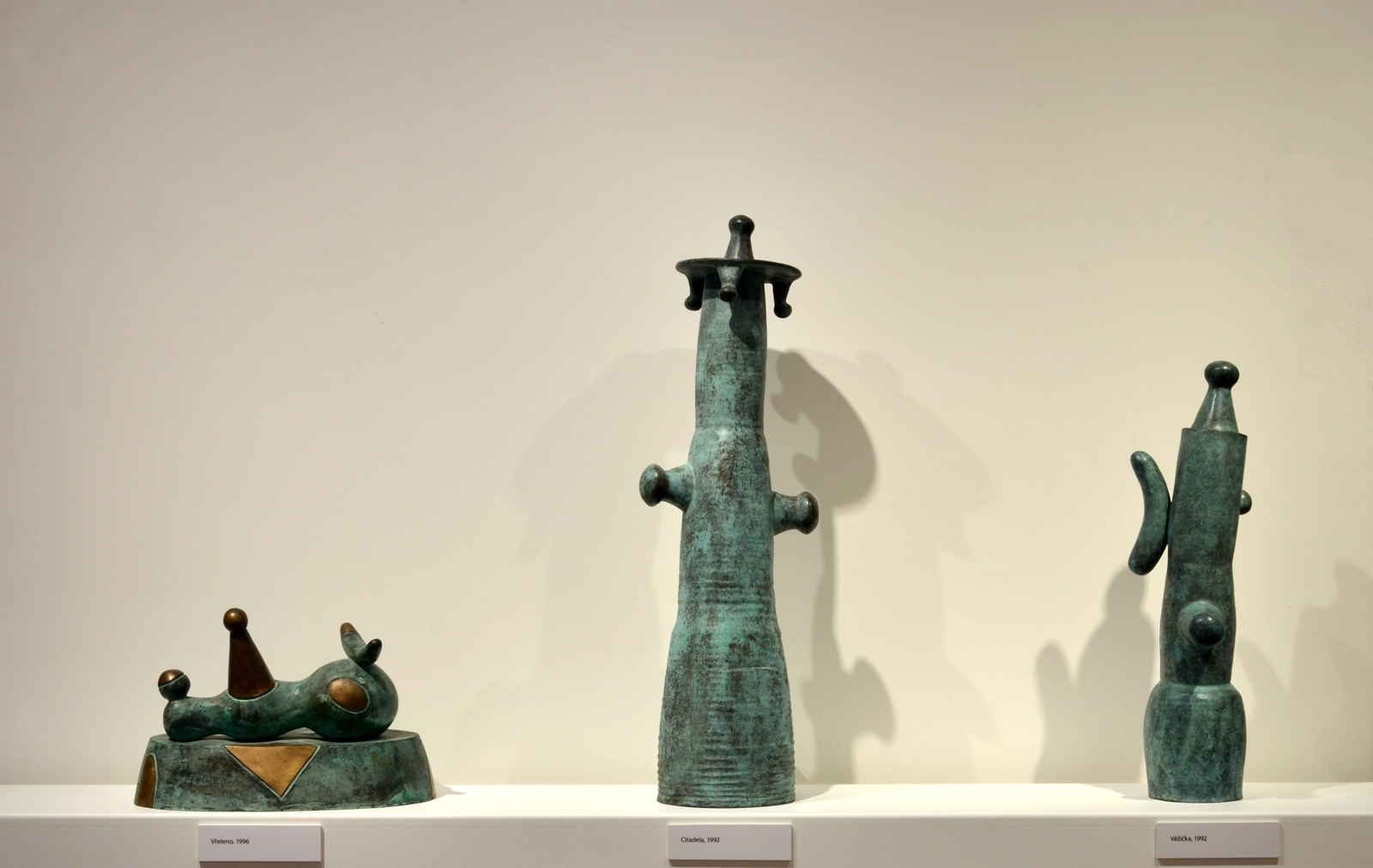
Spindle (1996), Citadel (1992), Spire (1992), bronze

As a three-dimensional counterpart to his paintings, he also creates spatial installations made of steel wire. He uses bent metal reinforcement obtained from the recycling of reinforced concrete, which he polychromes. Together with Jan Beran's artistic blacksmith shop, he has made polychromed welded metal sculptures of musicians for Průhonice.

=== Realizations (selection) ===
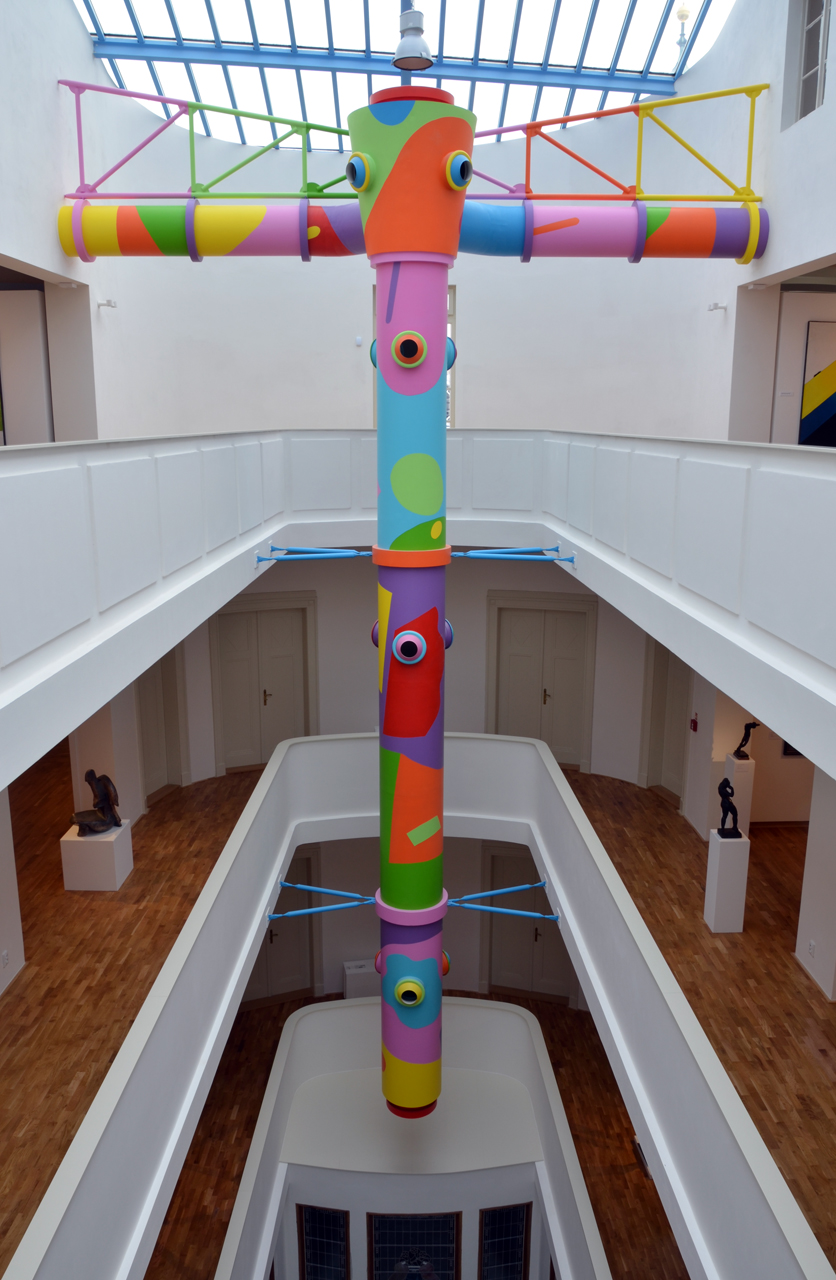
Aleš Lamr, Gallery of Modern Art in Hradec Králové, air conditioning (2017)

- 1979–1982 ceramic reliefs – Františkovy Lázně, Janské Lázně, Mariánské Lázně, Březová
- 1980–1983 children's pavilion L'AMARC in Montreal (with architect Martin Rajnisš)
- 1988 ceramic wall, KD Česká Lípa
- 1988 two ceramic walls, polychrome walls and chimney, Příbram Primary School
- 1992 interior mural, Czech Television building
- 1996 stained glass windows and cross, chapel in Petrovičky
- 1999 District Office Rychnov nad Kněžnou, mural, length 14 m
- 2001 The Way of the Cross, Temný důl, Maršov (in cooperation with the enamel factory in Český Brod)
- 2001 Sonnenhaus Schlossau, mural
- 2005 Czech Bar Association, mural
- 2015-16 interior design, Gallery of Modern Art, Hradec Králové

=== Illustrations ===
- Caribbean Lighthouse, poetry of the Caribbean, introduction by V. Klíma, illustrator Aleš Lamr, Československý spisovatel, Prague, 1987 (honorable mention in the Most Beautiful Book competition)
- The Bible, 21st century translation, Biblion 2009, ISBN 978-80-87282-28-1

=== Representation in collections ===
- National Gallery in Prague
- Musée d'Art Moderne de Paris (ARC)
- National Gallery of Art, Washington, D.C.
- Museum of National Art, Buenos Aires
- Gallery Art Space, Nishinomiya
- Sonnenring Galerie, Münster
- Städtische galerie Balingen
- Brooks Hall Gallery, North Carolina
- Alš South Bohemia Gallery, Hluboká nad Vltavou
- Central Bohemia Region Gallery in Kutná Hora
- Benedikt Rejt Gallery, Louny
- Regional Gallery in Liberec
- Art Gallery Karlovy Vary
- Gallery of Modern Art in Hradec Králové
- Gallery of Modern Art in Roudnice nad Labem
- Gallery of Fine Arts in Cheb
- Gallery of Fine Arts in Havlíčkův Brod
- Gallery of Fine Arts in Hodonin
- Gallery of Fine Arts in Ostrava
- West Bohemia Gallery in Plzeň
- Regional Gallery of Fine Arts in Zlín
- Moravian Museum, Brno
- Museum of Art Olomouc
- Museum of Art and Design, Benešov
- Gallery Klatovy / Klenová
- Novohrad Museum and Gallery, Lučenec
- Horácká galerie in Nové Město na Moravě
- Orlická Gallery in Rychnov nad Kněžnou
- private collections at home and abroad

=== Films ===
- 1986 A Visit to the Studio of Aleš Lamr, directed by Milan Maryška
- 1996 Ateliers, directed by P. Kačírek
- 2011 Artistic Confessions: Aleš Lamr, directed by Petr Skala, Czech TV

=== Author´s exhibitions (selection) ===
- 1968 Aleš Lamr: Paintings, Small Gallery, Prague
- 1975 Aleš Lamr: Paintings, Jilska Gallery, Prague
- 1976 Aleš Lamr: Paintings, Drawings, Sculptures, Gallery of Youth, Brno
- 1978 Aleš Lamr: Objects and Small Formats, Theatre in Nerudovka, Prague
- 1981 Aleš Lamr: Paintings, drawings, objects, Těšín Theatre, foyer, Český Těšín
- 1984 Aleš Lamr: Paintings / drawings / objects, Karlovy Vary Art Gallery
- 1987 Aleš Lamr: Paintings, drawings, objects, Central Cultural House of Railway Workers, Prague
- 1988 Aleš Lamr: Paintings, drawings, objects, Sovinec Gallery
- 1989 Aleš Lamr: Drawings, paintings, Gallery Opatov, Prague
- 1990 Aleš Lamr: Selected works, Regional Gallery of Fine Arts in Olomouc
- 1991 Horácká galerie in Nové Město na Moravě
- 1991 Aleš Lamr: Retrospective, Orlická Gallery in Rychnov nad Kněžnou
- 1993 Aleš Lamr: Selection of works, Exhibition Hall of Meat Shops, Pilsen
- 1998 Aleš Lamr: Acryl, aquarelle, pastelle, Galerie Pintner, Frankfurt am Main
- 1999 Aleš Lamr: Bilder, pastelle, aquarelle, Galerie Planie 22, Reutlingen
- 2003/2004 Aleš Lamr: Spirit blows where it will, Prague Castle Ballroom, AJG České Budějivice, ZČM Plzeň
- 2005 Aleš Lamr: New works / Recent works. Obrazy & objekty / Paintings & objects, Praha City Center
- 2006 Aleš Lamr: Playing for Real: Sculptures and Objects 1964–2006, Sovinec Castle, NM Prague City Hall, GM Plzeň
- 2008/2009 Aleš Lamr: V sobě / In Me, Gallery of Art, Karlovy Vary
- 2013 Aleš Lamr: Heavenly Setting, Church of the Assumption of the Virgin Mary, Letohrad
- 2015 Aleš Lamr: Maranatha, Nová síň Gallery, Prague
- 2016 Aleš Lamr: New Women, Topičův klub Topičova salonu, Prague
- 2017 Aleš Lamr: Brief retrospective, Gallery of Modern Art in Hradec Králové
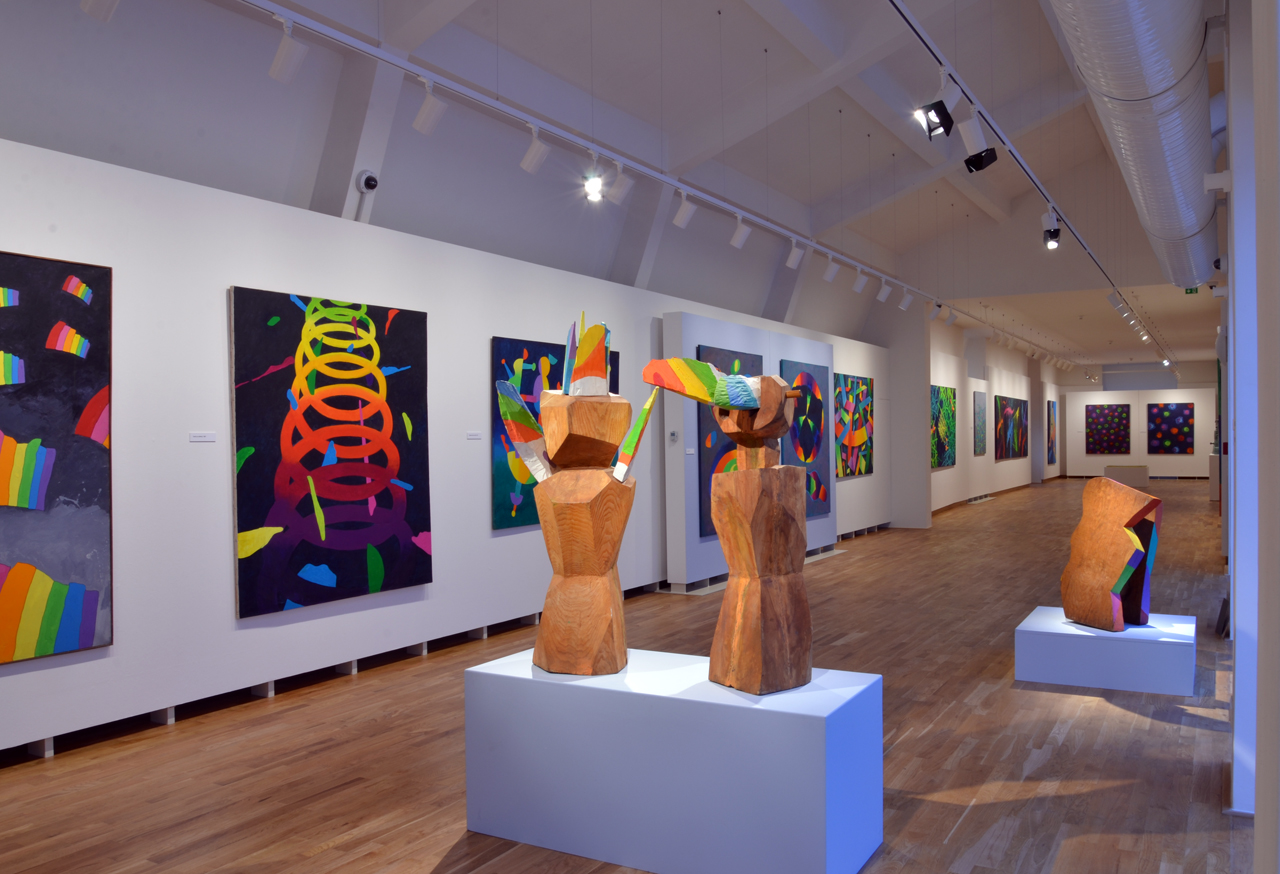
Aleš Lamr, Brief Retrospective, Gallery of Modern Art in Hradec Králové

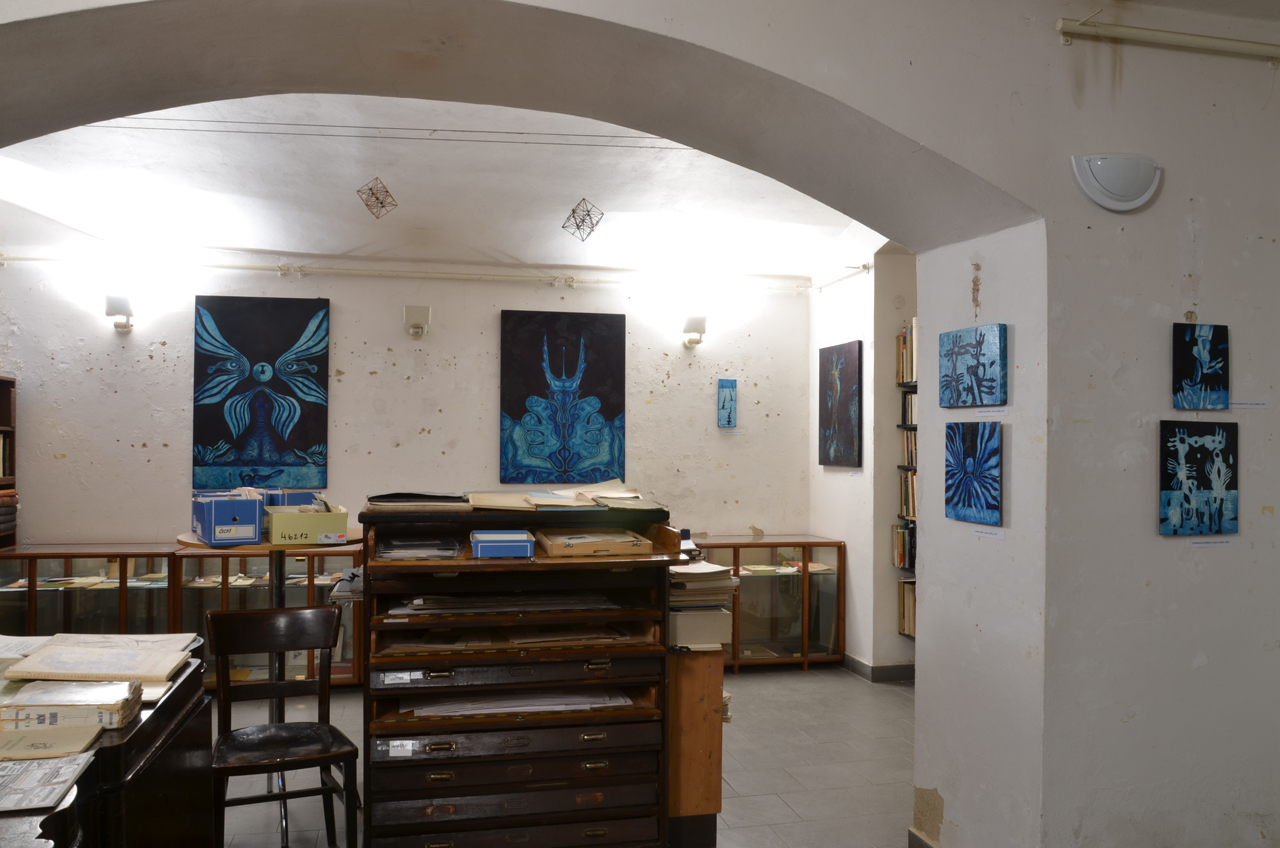
Aleš Lamr, Ztichlá klika Gallery (2017)

== Sources ==
- Three Lamrs, text by Josef Straka, Chodovská tvrz Gallery, Prague 2017
- Aleš Lamr: A Brief Retrospective, text by Jan Kříž, 28 p., GMU Hradec Králové, 2016, ISBN 978-80-87605-09-7
- Aleš Lamr: New Women, text by Jan Kříž, Topičův klub, Prague 2016
- Aleš Lamr: Maranatha, text by Jan Kříž, Nová síň Gallery, Prague 2015
- Aleš Lamr : in room : works from 1962 to 2008. Prague: Art D – Grafický ateliér Černý, 2008, 2008. 179 p. ISBN 978-80-903876-5-2.
- Aleš Lamr: The Game in Reality. Drawings, Sculptures, Objects, text by Jan Kříž, Art D - Graphic Atelier Černý, Prague 2006
- KŘÍŽ, Jan. Aleš Lamr. Prague: Art D-Grafický atelier Černý, 2003. 271 p. ISBN 80-902892-2-3.
- Aleš Lamr: Spirit blows where it will, text by Jan Kříž, Via Art Gallery, Prague Castle Administration, Prague 2003
- TOMEŠ, Josef, et al. Czech biographical dictionary of the 20th century: part II: K-P. Prague; Litomyšl: Paseka; Petr Meissner, 1999. 649 p. ISBN 80-7185-246-5. p. 247.
- Rudolf Greiner, Aleš Lamr: Farben – Felder – Figurationen, Galerie Planie 22, Reutlingen 1999
- Aleš Lamr: Works from 1963 to 1993, text by Jan Kříž, cat. 61 p., Kincl and Hauner 1993
