= Petrovický =

Petrovický is a surname. Notable people with the surname include:

- Ronald Petrovický (born 1977), Slovak ice hockey player
- Róbert Petrovický (born 1973), Slovak ice hockey player
