= Petrovičky =

- Municipality
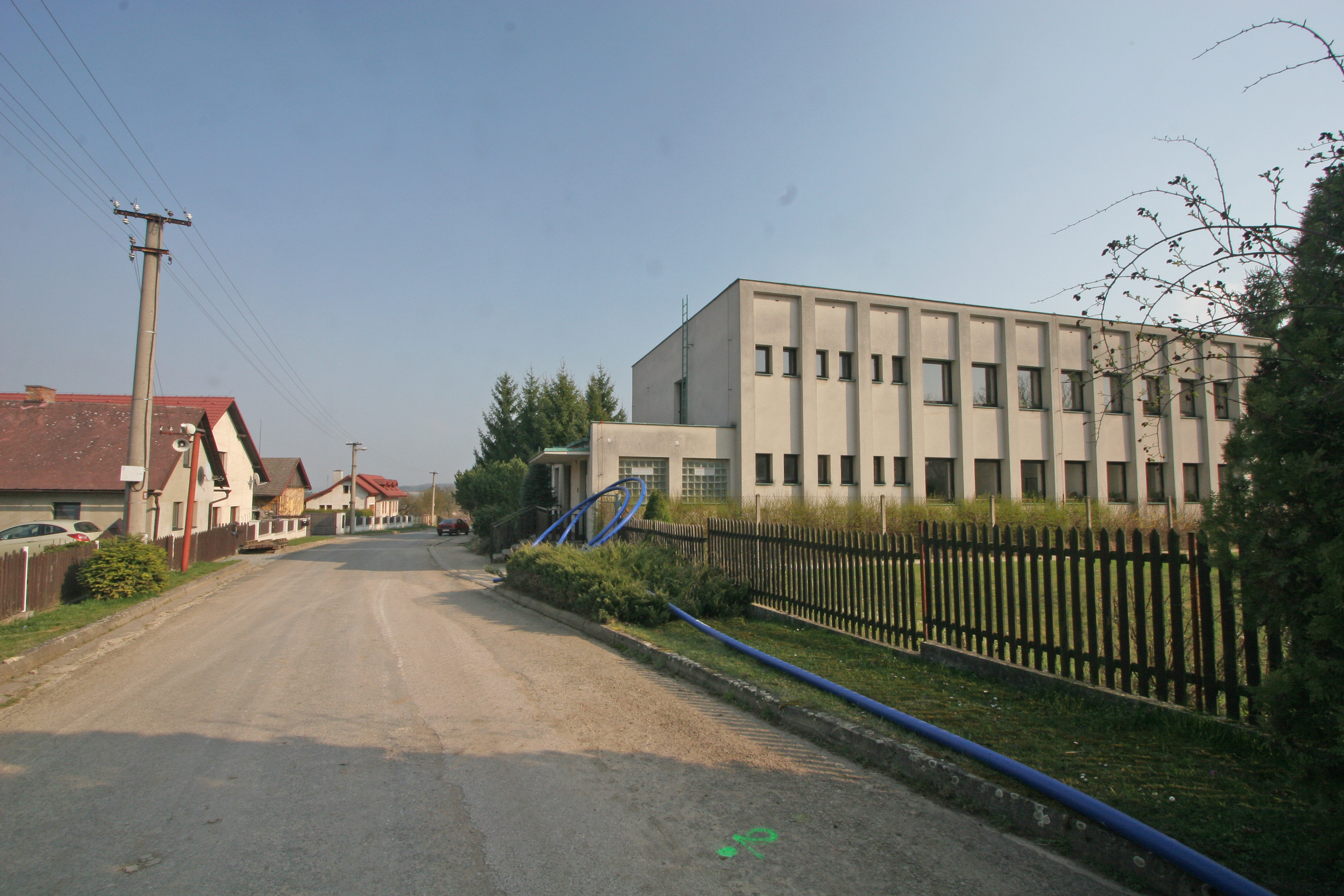
- Main street

- Location in the Czech Republic
- Coordinates: 50°17′57″N 15°36′27″E
- Country: Czech Republic
- Region: Hradec Králové
- District: Jičín
- First mentioned: 1393

Area
  - Total: 1.95 km^{2} (0.75 sq mi)
- Elevation: 272 m (892 ft)

Population (2026-01-01)
  - Total: 47
  - Density: 24/km^{2} (62/sq mi)
- Time zone: UTC+1 (CET)
  - Summer (DST): UTC+2 (CEST)
- Postal code: 508 01
- Website: www.petrovicky.info

Petrovičky is a municipality and village in Jičín District in the Hradec Králové Region of the Czech Republic. It has about 50 inhabitants.

== Demographics ==
Historical population
Year	Pop.	±%
1869	174	—
1880	184	+5.7%
1890	161	−12.5%
1900	172	+6.8%
1910	170	−1.2%
1921	143	−15.9%
1930	116	−18.9%
1950	100	−13.8%
1961	78	−22.0%
1970	55	−29.5%
1980	47	−14.5%
1991	37	−21.3%
2001	39	+5.4%
2011	46	+17.9%
2021	47	+2.2%
Source: Censuses
