= Choteč =

Choteč may refer to places in the Czech Republic:

- Choteč (Jičín District), a municipality and village in the Hradec Králové Region
- Choteč (Pardubice District), a municipality and village in the Pardubice Region
- Choteč (Prague-West District), a municipality and village in the Central Bohemian Region
