= Přemyslid Crucifix =

Polychromed wooden cross from Jihlava, Czech Republic

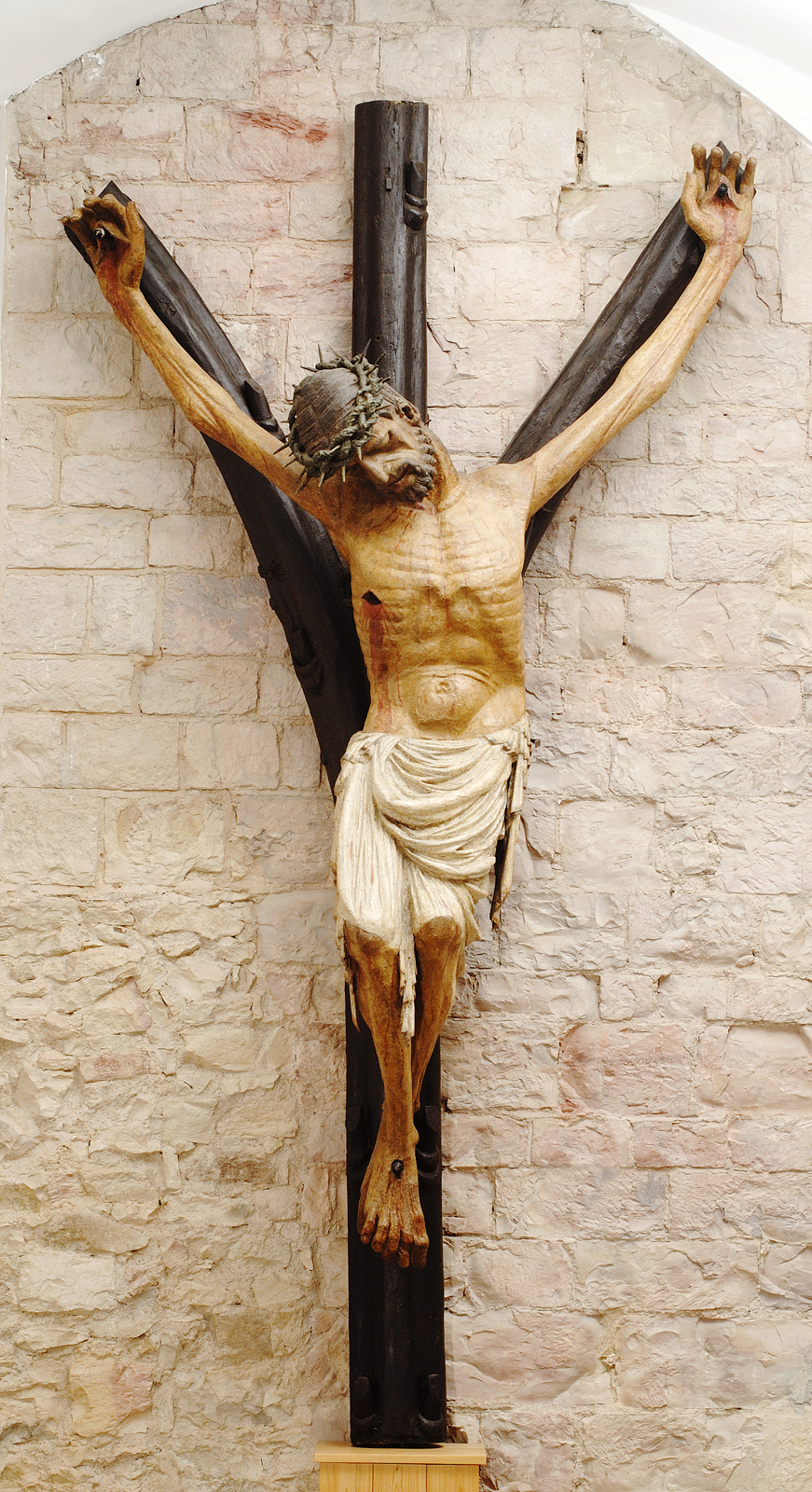
Přemyslid Crucifix, The Royal Canonry of Premonstratensians at Strahov

The Přemyslid Crucifix is a polychromed wooden cross from Jihlava dating from the first half of the 14th century. It is on display at the Picture Gallery of Strahov Monastery in Prague. In 2010, it was declared a national cultural monument by the Czech government.

== History ==
According to legend, the crucifix was dedicated to Jihlava by King Ottokar II or Ottokar I. It was, however, probably made in about 1330 and came to Jihlava in the 14th century from Germany. The crucifix was intended for the Dominican Church of the Raising of the Holy Cross that was founded in the mid-13th century. Cologne was the spiritual centre of the Dominican Order in Central Europe, and it was there that crucifixes of this type originate. Following the Josephine reforms and the abolishing of the Jesuit Order, the Dominicans relocated to the Jesuit Church of St. Ignatius of Loyola in Jihlava, where the crucifix was placed in a glazed late Rococo altar in the left side chapel near the entrance. It was later moved from the Church of St Ignatius to the Church of St. James the Great which, from 1591, came under the administration of the Strahov Premonstratensian Monastery. Under the Communist regime, Strahov Monastery was abolished and the crucifix could thus only be given specialist evaluation after 1989, following its first modern restoration in Prague between 1994 and 1997. Due to unsuitable climatic conditions there, a modern synthetic-resin replica was made in 2012 for the Church of St. James the Great in Jihlava. The Přemyslid Crucifix is now on show in the Picture Gallery of Strahov Monastery.

== Description and classification ==
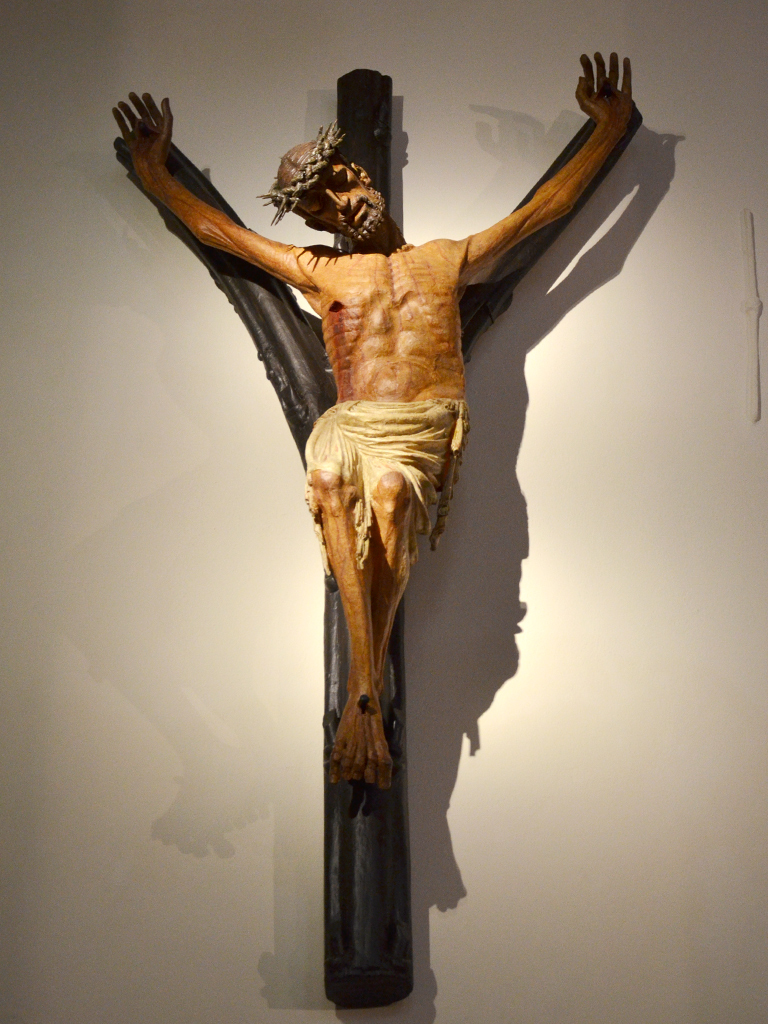
The Přemyslid Crucifix, modern replica, parish Church of St. James the Great, Jihlava

The cross of the Church of St. Maria im Kapitol in Cologne dating from 1304 provided the model for the expressive anticlassical style of the 'mystical crucifixes' (crucifix dolorosum, Gabelkrucifix) that originate in the German Rhineland region. The Přemyslid Crucifix dates from later on than the crucifixes of Fabriano and Palermo and follows on more closely from the crucifix in the Church of St. Maria vom Frieden in Cologne and both crucifixes from near Salzburg. (Nonnberg, Friesach). It is stylistically so similar to the crucifix that Hungarian pilgrims brought from Cologne to Andernach that it could even come from the same workshop. The crucifix at the house of the Augustinian Canons at Klosterneuburg follows on from the Přemyslid crucifix with its sculptural portrayal and less expressive treatment.

The polychromed wooden crucifix differs from other Gothic sculptures of Bohemian origin with its larger than life-size dimensions and dramatic expression that still harks back to the 13th century. Christ's body, including his arms, is 245 cm tall and his arms span 158 cm across. The cross itself is 309 cm tall. Its shape, in the form of a deeply branching tree trunk with sawn-off branches represents the symbolic Tree of the Knowledge of Good and Evil. The figure of Christ has a disproportionately enlarged head, hands and feet. His head with its half-open mouth and lowered eyes leans down to the right-hand side and tenses the muscles in his neck. The heads of the prophets on the west façade of Strasbourg Cathedral could have provided the model for this.

The expressive suffering in Christ's face is emphasised by the carving that tends towards geometrical stylisation and combines sharp convex and concave shapes. Christ's head has a precisely carved beard and a large crown of thorns whose thorns are long and pierce his skull. Like other 'crucifixi dolorosi' this sculpture also served as a reliquary, which is indicated by the opening in the head. The long locks of hair that can be seen in earlier photographs were not original and were removed during restoration. Christ's large hands with their long twisted fingers have wounds modelled in swollen skin around the nails. The crossed feet, pieced by a single nail, also have dramatically emphasised wounds.

The body is relatively robust and has schematically indicated ribs that, at the sides, reach down to the waist. The sunken stomach has four convex folds and the lower edge of the chest is M-shaped. The wound in Christ's side is open and streams of blood flow out of it as far down as his toes. In contrast to earlier depictions, this crucifixion is portrayed with naturalistic accuracy – the slender arms are stretched by the weight of the body and the nailed legs have strongly bent knees. Christ's loincloth is folded over itself several times and is made up of numerous folds that are deep, bowl-shaped and horizontal at the front, while at the sides they are shallow and gathered up in densely vertical pleats. The four tips of the loincloth hang down on both sides and between Christ's knees. The pattern of the loincloth is similar to those of the crucifixes of Nonnberg and Friesach. It also partly matches the Dalmatian crucifixes that date from later on.

Until the 13th century, Christ on the cross was almost exclusively depicted as triumphant over death (Christus triumphans) – as a smooth figure lacking signs of suffering and often with a crown on his head. These were crucifixions with four nails in which Christ's legs were positioned next to each other on a base. From the mid-13th century, however, the three-nail crucifix dominated. It had its origin in mystical trends in the church that focused on the human aspect of Christ's suffering and encouraged the faithful to contemplate on and identify with Christ. At the turn of the 14th century the church had to cope with the increasing influence of religious heretics, and mendicant orders along with the Inquisition played a major role in suppressing them. The drastic depiction of Christ on the cross has its origin in period records of mystical visions and was intended to reinforce the belief that the Messiah sacrificed himself to redeem humanity from its sins.

== Restoration ==
The crucifix was restored in 1997. The work's owner and the Institute of Art History of the Czech Academy of Sciences agreed that, with regard to the good state of preservation of the original Gothic polychromy, all the later overpainting would be removed, leaving only the oldest layers. Over the course of 600 years, ten foundation layers and layers of overpainting were applied to the crucifix. They were gradually removed and documented. The oldest grey-pink paint of the flesh tones was only preserved in fragments on the back of Christ's hand, which is why, during the restoration, the light-brown colour of the body, also dating from the Gothic period, was retained. Christ's loincloth was originally light brown, but was subsequently painted over several times. During the restoration, the four most recent layers of overpainting were removed and the oldest surviving layer, ivory-coloured with drops of blood and a golden hem, was retained. The fork-shaped cross made of spruce wood (the central part) and field maple (the forks) is original, including the siliceous foundation layer and traces of the original polychromy. The oldest dark-brown overpainting was retained. In contrast to related German sculptures of Christ made of oak or walnut (Coesfeld, Haltern), the Jihlava Christ is made of soft poplar wood and has more numerous smaller parts. The joints were concealed by being pasted over with canvas and were, in places, evened out with thick foundation layers of siliceous clay and chalk whose composition corresponds with materials that were used in Bohemian Gothic panel painting and wooden sculpture of the 14th century.

== Importance ==
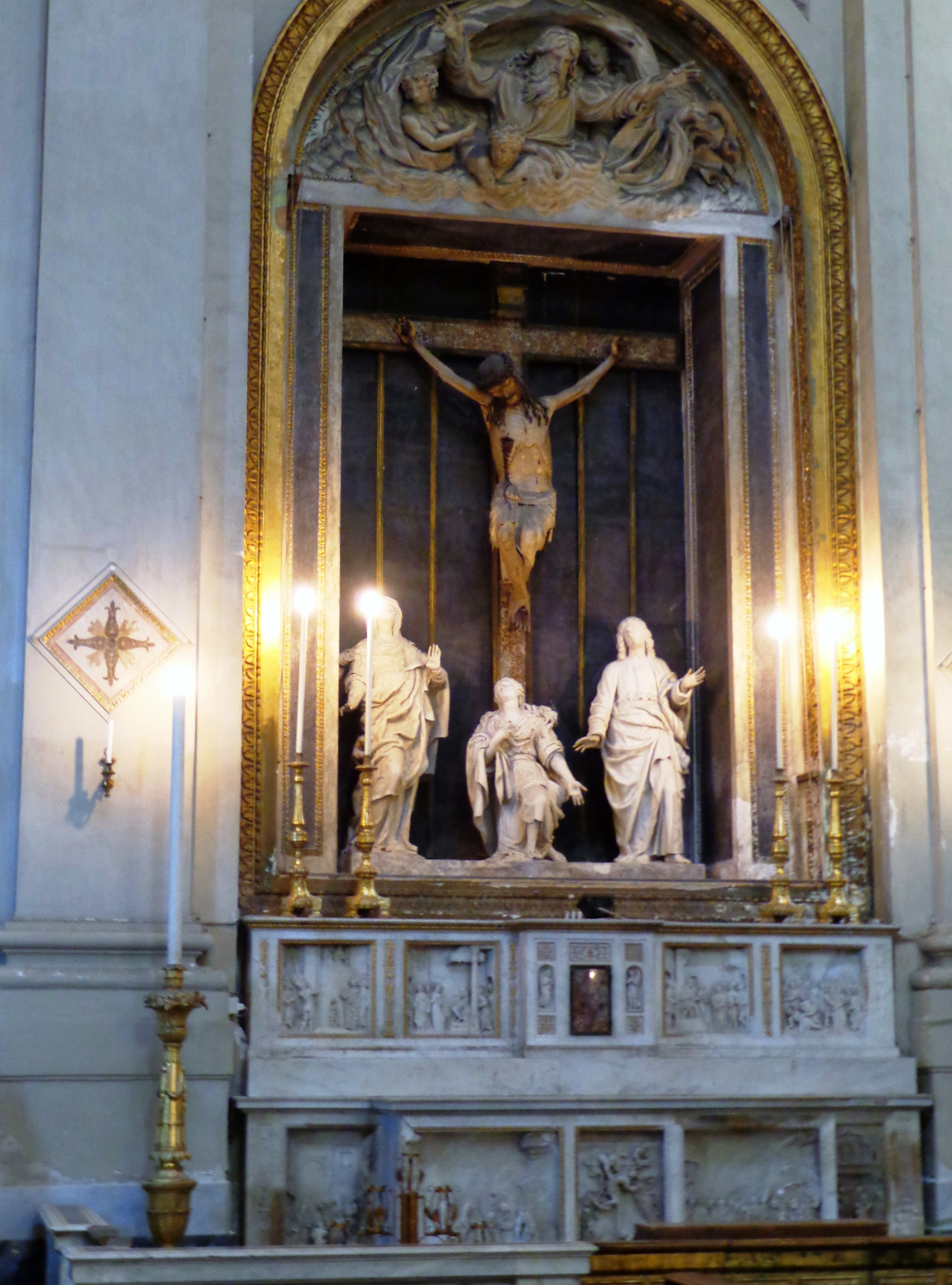
Crucifix, Palermo cathedral (before 1311?)

With its historical and artistic value, this work ranks among the most important of the group of suffering crucifixes. There are only a few dozen similar early Gothic works throughout Europe, the oldest being the crucifixes at Nonnberg Abbey near Salzburg, Il Crocifisso Chiaramonte in Palermo Cathedral, at the Chapelle du Devot-Christ in Perpignan (1307) and the crucifixes in the Italian towns of Lucera (finished 1317), Sulmona, Tolentino and Fabriano. Others can be found in the Dalmatian towns of Split, Kotor and Piran.

== Sources ==
- Ivana Kyzourová, Pavel Kalina, The "Přemyslovský" Crucifix of Jihlava. Stylistic Character and Meaning of a Crucifixus dolorosus, pp. 35–64, in: Mudra A, Ottová M (eds.), Ars vídendí, Professori Jaromír Homolka ad honorem, Opera Facultatis Theologiae catholicae Universitatis Carolinae Pragensis, Historia et historia artium, Vol. 5, Prague 2006, ISBN 80-903600-9-2
- Hamsík Mojmír, Hamsíková Radana, Přemyslovský krucifix z Jihlavy, restaurace a technika, pp. 413–421, in: Mudra A, Ottová M (eds.), Ars vídendí, Professori Jaromír Homolka ad honorem, Opera Facultatis Theologiae catholicae Universitatis Carolinae Pragensis, Historia et historia artium, Vol. 5, Prague 2006, ISBN 80-903600-9-2
- Godehard Hoffmann, Das Gabelkreuz in St. Maria im Kapitol zu Köln und das Phänomen der Crucifixi dolorosi in Europa, Arbeitsheft der rheinischen Denkmalpflege 69, 2006
- Pavel Kalina: Giovanni Pisano, the Dominicans, and the Origin of the crucifixi dolorosi, in: artibus et historiae, Nr 47 (XXIV), 2003, pp. 81–101
- Ulrike Bergmann (ed.), Neue Forschungen sur gefassten Skulptur des Mittelalters. Die gotischen Crucifixi dolorosi, Kölner Beitrage zur Restaurierung und Konservierung von Kunst- und Kulturgut, Bd. 14. Cologne 2001
- Kyzourová I. (ed.), Přemyslovský krucifix a jeho doba, kat. výstavy, Královská kanonie premonstrátů na Strahově, Prague 1988, p. 27-29
- Pavel Kalina, The "Přemyslovský" Crucifix of Jihlava. Stylistic Character and Meaning of a Crucifixus dolorosus, Wallraf-Richartz-Jahrbuch LVIII, 1996, pp. 35–64
- Monika von Alemann-Schwartz, Crucifixus dolorosus. Beitrage sur Polychromie und Ikonographie der rheinischen Gabelkruzifixe, Diss. MS, Bonn 1976
- Géza de Francovich, L'origine e la diffusione del crocifisso gotico doloroso, in. Kunstgeschichtliches Jahrbuch der Bibliotheca Hertziana, 2, 1938, pp. 143–263
- I. Zahradník, Kříž Přemyslovský v Jihlavě, Památky archeologické a místopisné 19, 1900–1901, pp. 491–496
