= Basilica of the Assumption (Prague) =

Church in the Strahov Monastery, Prague, Czech Republic

Coordinates: 50°5′11.04″N 14°23′21.12″E

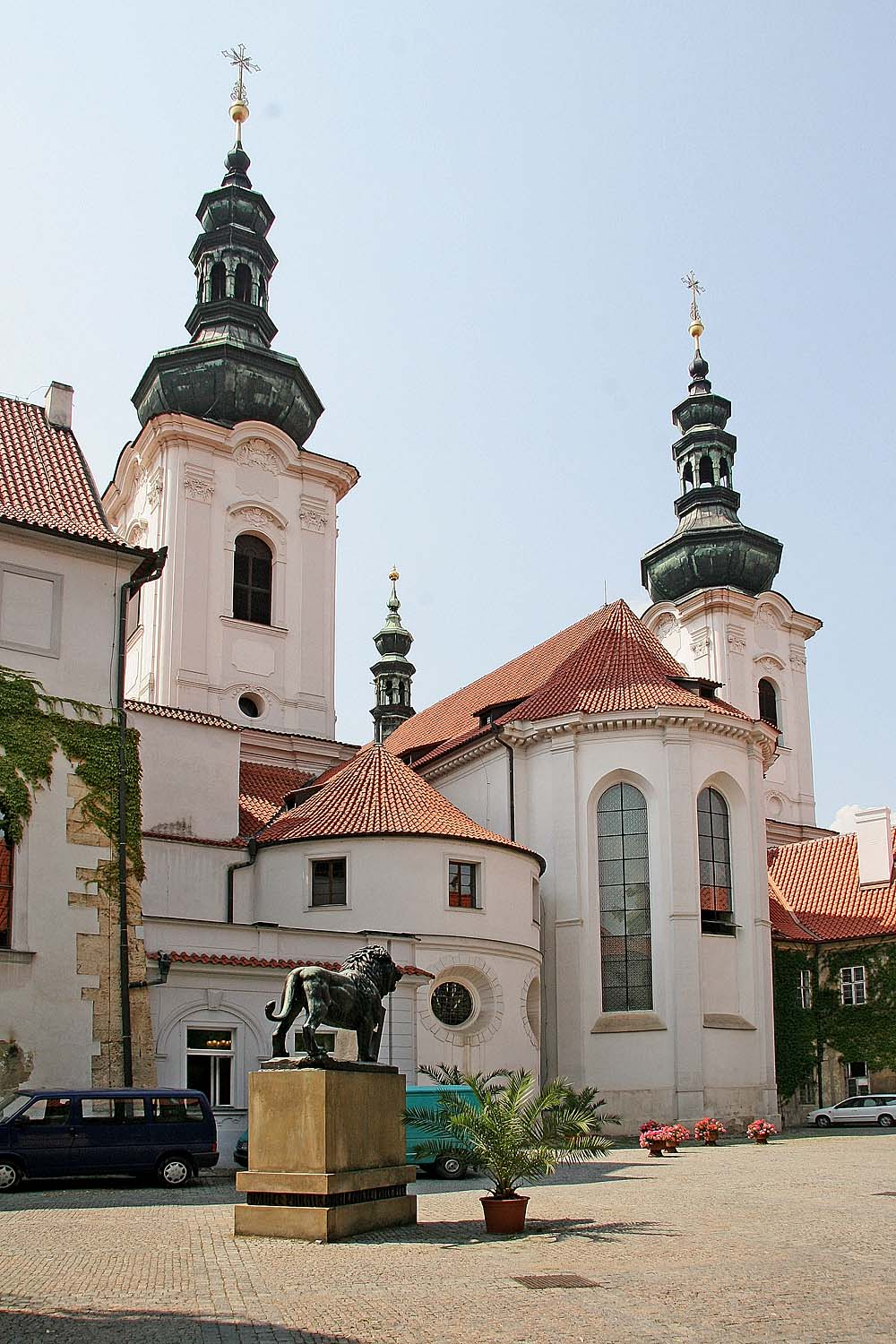
Basilica of the Assumption in the Strahov Monastery, Prague.

The Basilica of the Assumption of Our Lady (Czech: Bazilika Nanebevzetí Panny Marie) is a church in the Strahov Monastery, Prague. It was originally constructed as a Romanesque basilica and later rebuilt in Baroque style.

The Baroque basilica is located in the courtyard of the Strahov Monastery in Prague 1–Hradčany. Originally a Romanesque-Gothic canonical church at Strahov, it was founded in 1140 by members of the order.

Famous organists Jan Křtitel Kuchař and Robert Führer worked here. In 1787, Wolfgang Amadeus Mozart improvised on the church's organ. The original organ was replaced after 1900.
