= Johann Lohel =

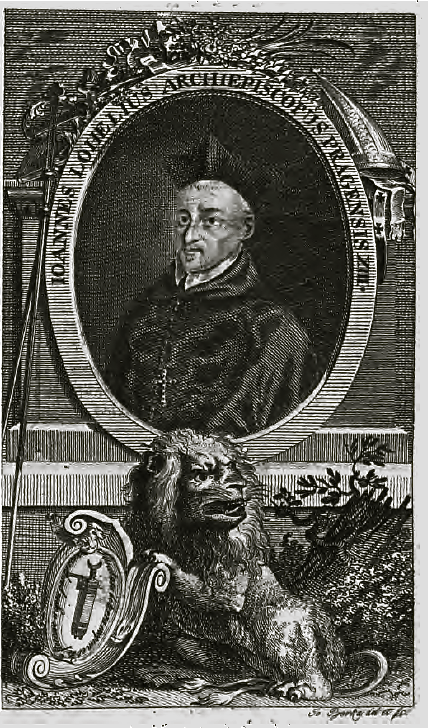

Johann Lohelius (1549 – November 2, 1622), better known as Johann Lohel, was the archbishop of Prague from September 18, 1612, until his death.

== Early life ==
Born in 1549 in a poor family, Johann was piously brought up. At fifteen he was engaged as a domestic in the Norbertine Teplá Abbey (German: Tepl), but was allowed to follow the classes in the abbey school; he soon surpassed his fellow students, and in 1573 received the Norbertine habit. After a two-years novitiate, Lohelius went to study philosophy at Prague. He was ordained in 1576 and was recalled to the abbey. He gave a course of sermons at Tepl, with whom he reconverted many Lutherans back to Catholicism.

In 1579 he became prior of Mount Sion Abbey, at Strahov. The abbot and he strove, with some success, to lift the abbey out of the unfortunate state into which it had fallen. Lohelius was soon called back to Tepl. However, he was in 1583 allowed to resume the office of prior of Strahov.

== Archbishop of Prague ==
Lohelius was elected abbot of the Strahov Monastery of Prague in 1586. With him a new era of progress and prosperity began on the Abbey of Strahov, which was in decline when he became its abbot. The emperor and the magnates of Bohemia generously assisted him in restoring the church and abbey buildings. The abbot-general, John Despruets, named him his vicar-general and visitor of the circles of Austria, Bohemia, Hungary, and Poland. In 1604 he was consecrated bishop of Sebaste in partibus, as auxiliary to the archbishop of Prague. During the illness of archbishop Karel Graf von Lamberk, Paul V appointed Lohelius coadjutor in May 1612. At the death of von Lamberg on 18 September 1612, Lohelius became archbishop of Prague. He crowned Ferdinand II (future Emperor) as King of Bohemia (29 June 1617),

== Exile, return and death ==
In 1609 the Protestants of Bohemia were granted freedom of religion by the Letter of Majesty issued by Emperor Rudolph II. This strengthened them and, after having gained the upper hand in Prague, they began persecuting the clergy and expelled many priests, regular and secular. The cathedral, property of the Crown (as part of the Royal Castle ) and not of the Church, was altered to suit the Calvinistic worship; the altars were demolished, and the paintings and statues destroyed in December 1619. Lohelius had to take refuge in Vienna, where he remained until November 1620. After the battle of White Mountain, the archbishop and his chapter, as well as the Jesuits and other religious, returned to Prague. The cathedral, cleansed and refurnished, was again consecrated on 28 February 1621. Lohelius died soon after, of a slow fever on November 2, 1622; he was buried in the church of Strahov.
