= Jan Křtitel Kuchař =

Czech organist, mandolinist, harpsichordist, music composer, conductor and teacher

Jan Křtitel Kuchař (German: Johann Baptist Kucharz; 5 March 1751 – 18 February 1829) was a Czech organist, mandolinist, harpsichordist, music composer, operatic conductor and teacher.

== Life and career ==
Kuchař was born on 5 March 1751 in Choteč, Bohemia, Holy Roman Empire. Soon after his birth, Kuchař's parents moved to Mlázovice, where he lived out his childhood. He achieved basic music knowledge in Vrchlabí with the organist Alex Thám. Later he studied at the Jesuits seminary in Hradec Králové and Jičín. He was a student of the organist Josef Seger in Prague. From 1772 he acted as organist in the Church of St. Henry in Prague. In Prague, he also began teaching music for the noble Hartig, Bucquoy and Příchovský families. He was active in the teaching of singing, piano, organ, and composition.

Kuchař was among the first to recognise the genius of Wolfgang Amadeus Mozart and started to propagate it. In 1786, he most likely played in the Estates Theatre at the premiere of The Marriage of Figaro and in January 1787 he became acquainted with Mozart on his Prague visit. On 28 October in the same year, he played together with Mozart on harpsichord at the premiere performance of Don Giovanni. He wrote piano excerpts from both operas, as well as from the opera Così fan tutte. In addition, he composed recitatives for an Italian version of The Magic Flute.

In 1790, Kuchař left the church after being nominated as organist of the Strahov Monastery, in the Church of the Assumption of the Virgin Mary, on 1 September.

He accepted the offer and played organ at the Strahov Monastery. He continued to teach mandolin, organ and the theory of music. He also began to perform stand-alone concerts and his reputation soon spread, for in 1791 he was appointed conductor of the opera, Prague, and he officiated there for many years, during which time several of his own works met with success. It was while he was conductor of the Prague opera that he first met and became intimately associated with Mozart. He was a friend of the great composer during his residence in Prague, and at the first performance of Don Giovanni, 29 October 1787, Kuchař played the mandolin in the orchestra, accompanying the serenade Deli Vieni, while Mozart conducted.

The influence of Mozart, who in 1787 improvised on the Strahov organ, is perceptible in Kuchař's music and it also led Kuchař to Freemasonry in Prague. From 1791, he performed as harpsichordist of the Pražská operní společnost (Prague Opera Society). On 6 September 1791, he likely played at the premiere of Mozart's opera La clemenza di Tito. In this period he composed a series of organ and chamber compositions, especially for the Strahov choir.

Music historian Philip J. Bone called Kuchař "a consummate artist on the mandolin and an esteemed teacher" and said his pupils numbered many of the most aristocratic members of society. Kuchař remained conductor of the opera until 1800 when he resigned.

Kuchař died on 18 February 1829 in Prague.

== Works ==
Despite his contemporary success, he is not a notable composer of Classical period. However a few organ works include hints of early Romanticism.

Among his compositions are organ concertos, piano sonatas, and various sonatas and other pieces for the mandolin. His most known works are two organ concertos, concert fantaisies, fugues, toccatas and others.
