= Mlázovice =

- Market town
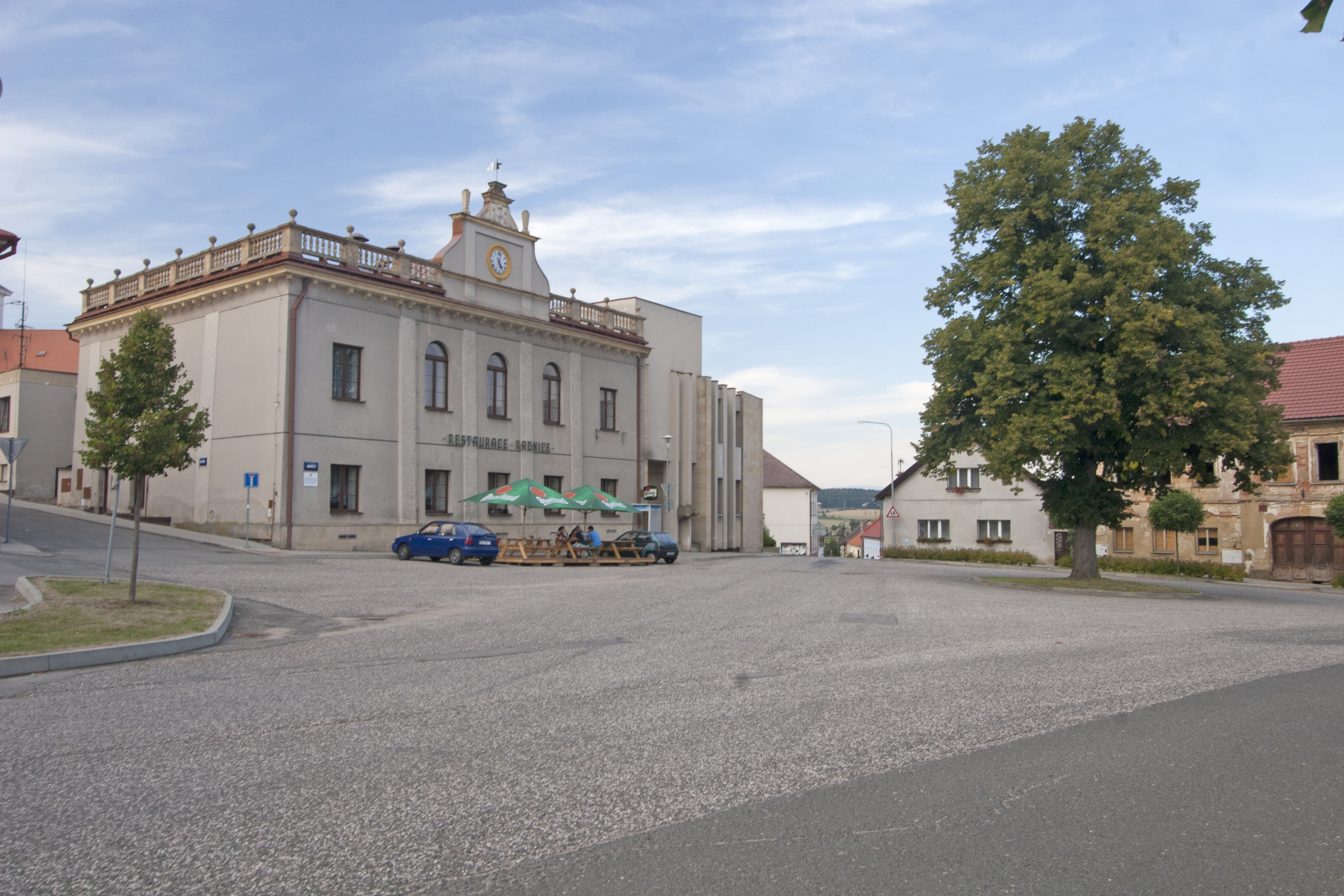
- Town hall on the town square

- Flag Coat of arms

- Location in the Czech Republic
- Coordinates: 50°24′43″N 15°31′18″E
- Country: Czech Republic
- Region: Hradec Králové
- District: Jičín
- First mentioned: 1360

Area
  - Total: 8.52 km^{2} (3.29 sq mi)
- Elevation: 304 m (997 ft)

Population (2026-01-01)
  - Total: 551
  - Density: 64.7/km^{2} (167/sq mi)
- Time zone: UTC+1 (CET)
  - Summer (DST): UTC+2 (CEST)
- Postal codes: 507 58, 507 81
- Website: www.mlazovice.cz

Mlázovice (Czech pronunciation: [ˈmlaːzovɪtsɛ]) is a market town in Jičín District in the Hradec Králové Region of the Czech Republic. It has about 600 inhabitants.

== Administrative division ==
Mlázovice consists of two municipal parts (in brackets population according to the 2021 census):

- Mlázovice (546)
- Mezihoří (5)

== Etymology ==
The name Mlázovice is derived from the personal name Mlaz, meaning "the village of Mlaz's people". The initial name of the village was Mlazovice, but in the 16th century it was distorted to Mlázovice because of its similarity with the word mlází ('young forest').

== Geography ==
Mlázovice is located about 12 kilometres (7 mi) east of Jičín and 30 km (19 mi) northwest of Hradec Králové. It lies in the Jičín Uplands. The highest point is the hill Maxinec at 450 m (1,476 ft) above sea level. The Javorka River flows along the eastern municipal border.

== History ==
The first written mention of Mlázovice is from 1360, when there was a fortress owned by Jiřík of Mlázovice. The owners of Mlázovice often changed. In 1424, during the Hussite Wars, the fortress and the village were burned down, but the village recovered. In 1540, during the rule of the Karlík of Nežetice family, Mlázovice was promoted to a market town. In 1594, Mlázovice was acquired by the Smiřický family and annexed to the Hořice estate.

== Demographics ==
Historical population

Year	Pop.	±%
1869	1,049	—
1880	1,010	−3.7%
1890	914	−9.5%
1900	830	−9.2%
1910	790	−4.8%

Year	Pop.	±%
1921	782	−1.0%
1930	732	−6.4%
1950	553	−24.5%
1961	697	+26.0%
1970	659	−5.5%

Year	Pop.	±%
1980	683	+3.6%
1991	598	−12.4%
2001	594	−0.7%
2011	552	−7.1%
2021	551	−0.2%

Source: Censuses

== Transport ==
There are no railways or major roads passing through the municipality.

== Sights ==
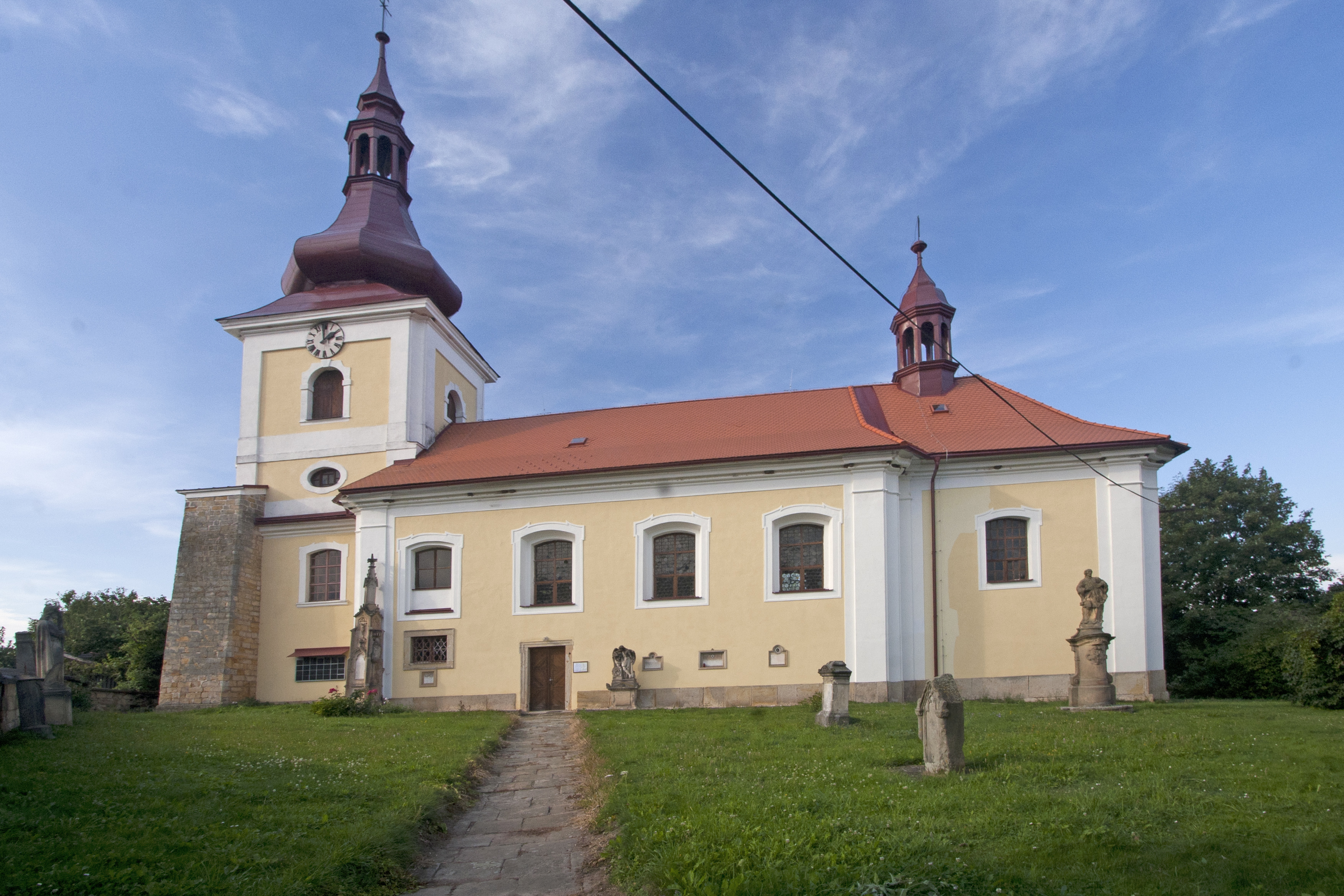
Church of the Holy Trinity

The main landmark of Mlázovice is the Church of the Holy Trinity. It was built in the Baroque style in 1725, on the site of an older wooden church. The bell tower was finished in 1760.

== Notable people ==
- Jan Křtitel Kuchař (1751–1829), musician and composer; lived here in childhood
