= Choteč (Jičín District) =

- Municipality
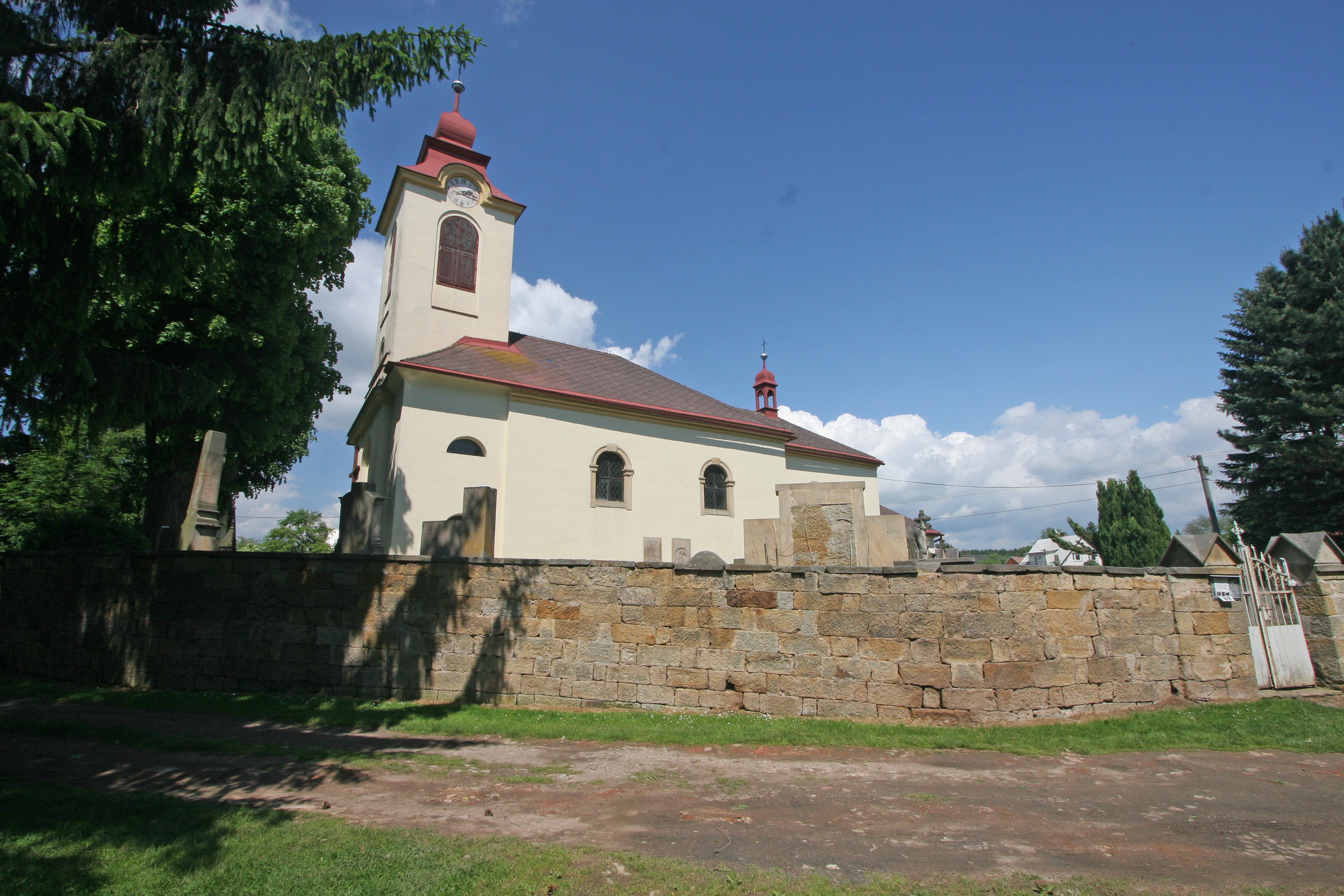
- Church of Saint Nicholas

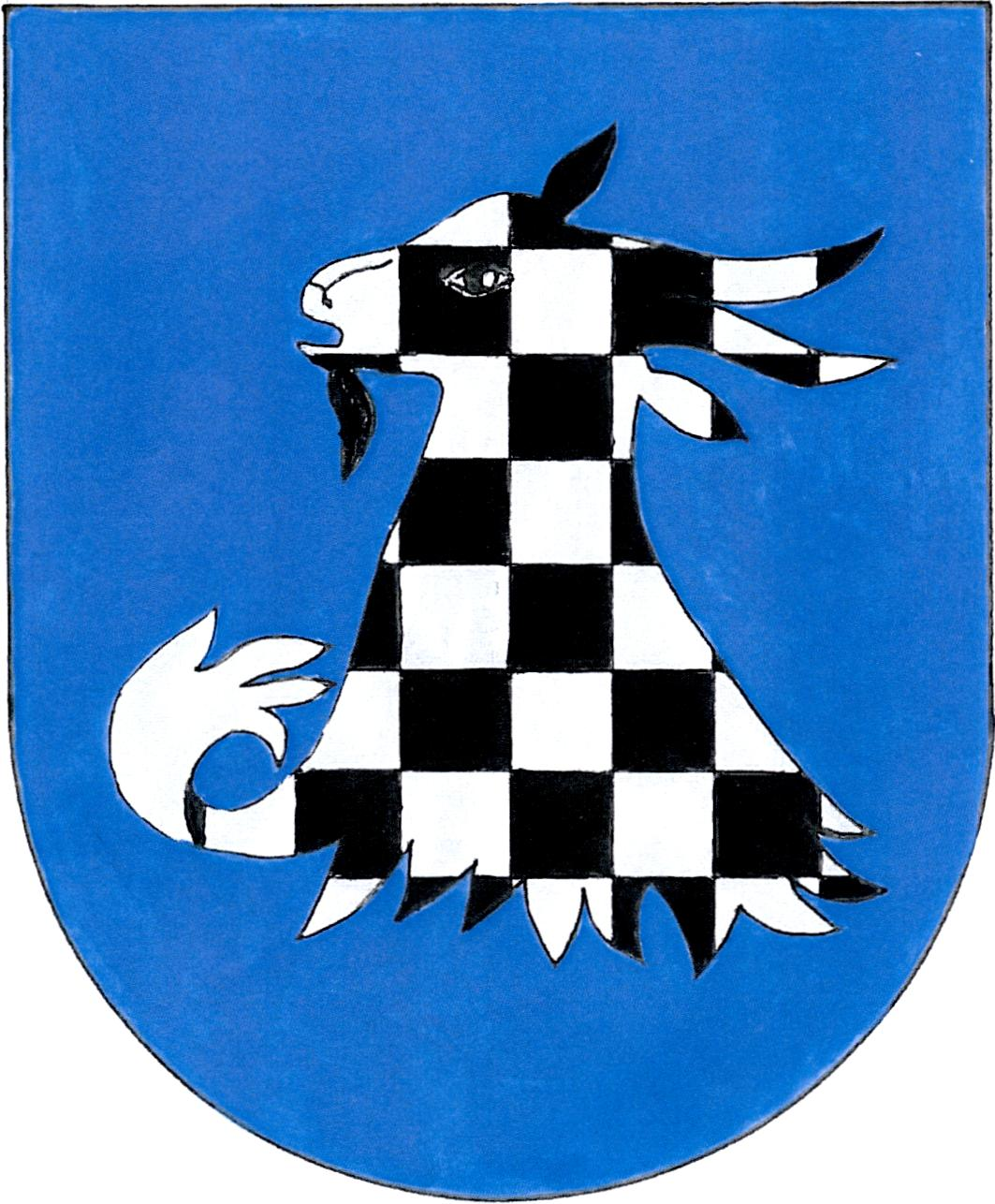
- Flag Coat of arms

- Location in the Czech Republic
- Coordinates: 50°25′58″N 15°30′58″E
- Country: Czech Republic
- Region: Hradec Králové
- District: Jičín
- First mentioned: 1356

Area
  - Total: 6.08 km^{2} (2.35 sq mi)
- Elevation: 310 m (1,020 ft)

Population (2026-01-01)
  - Total: 213
  - Density: 35.0/km^{2} (90.7/sq mi)
- Time zone: UTC+1 (CET)
  - Summer (DST): UTC+2 (CEST)
- Postal code: 507 81
- Website: www.chotec.cz

Choteč is a municipality and village in Jičín District in the Hradec Králové Region of the Czech Republic. It has about 200 inhabitants.

== Demographics ==
Historical population
| Year | Pop. | ±% |
|---|---|---|
| 1869 | 765 | — |
| 1880 | 698 | −8.8% |
| 1890 | 663 | −5.0% |
| 1900 | 575 | −13.3% |
| 1910 | 595 | +3.5% |
| 1921 | 570 | −4.2% |
| 1930 | 518 | −9.1% |
| 1950 | 387 | −25.3% |
| 1961 | 353 | −8.8% |
| 1970 | 296 | −16.1% |
| 1980 | 231 | −22.0% |
| 1991 | 216 | −6.5% |
| 2001 | 193 | −10.6% |
| 2011 | 200 | +3.6% |
| 2021 | 199 | −0.5% |
Source: Censuses

== Notable people ==
- Jan Křtitel Kuchař (1751–1829), musician and composer
