= Choteč (Pardubice District) =

- Municipality
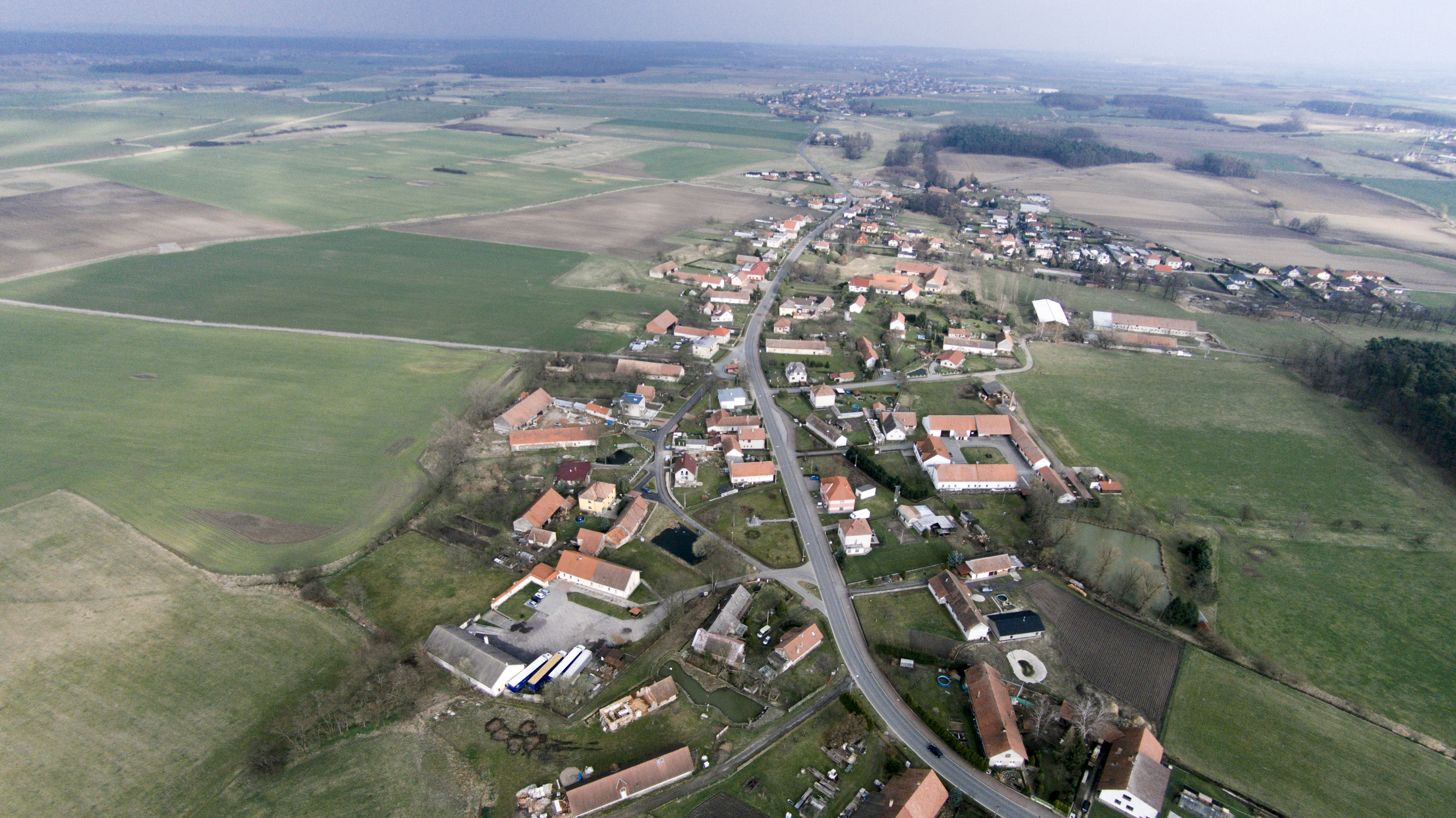
- Aerial view

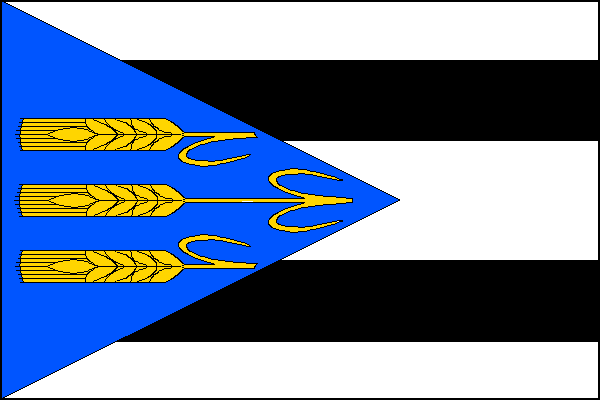
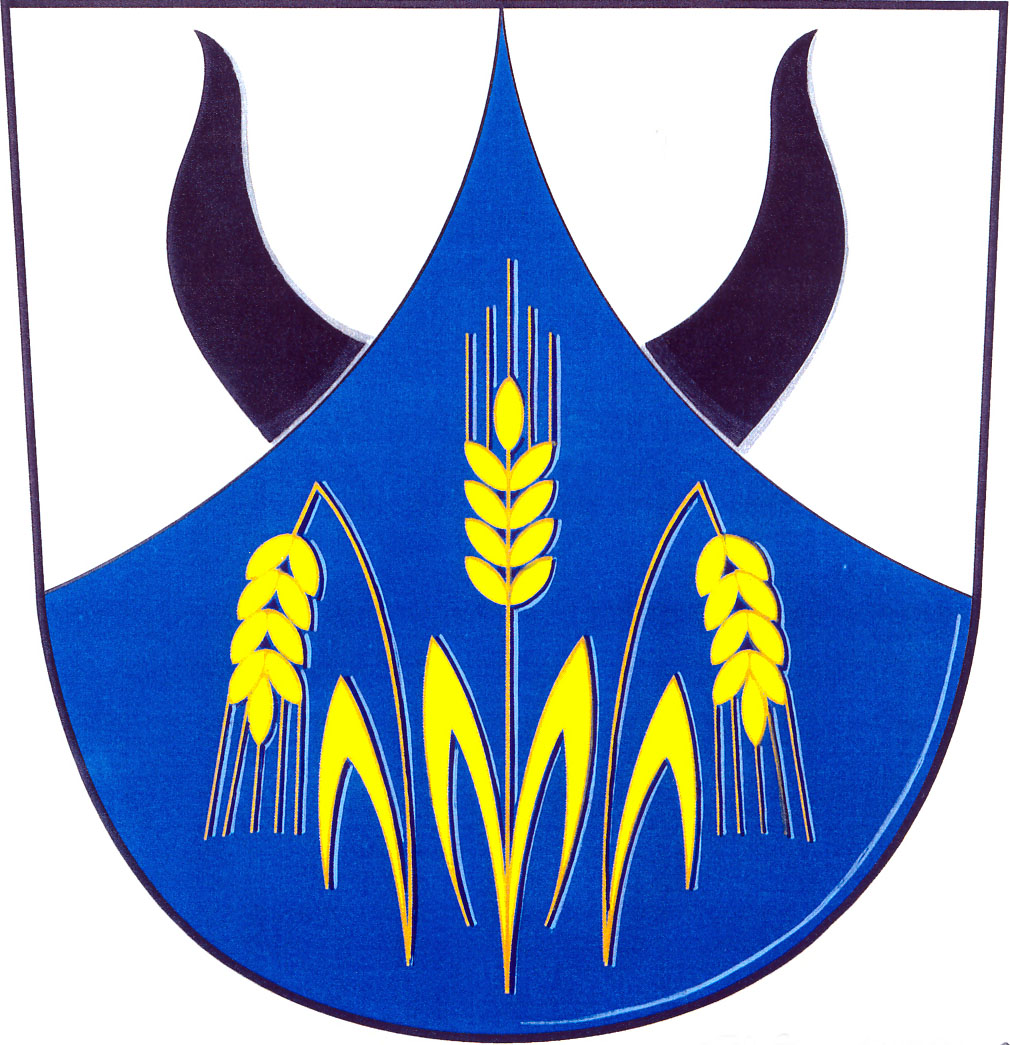
- Flag Coat of arms

- Location in the Czech Republic
- Coordinates: 50°4′59″N 15°52′49″E
- Country: Czech Republic
- Region: Pardubice
- District: Pardubice
- First mentioned: 1394

Area
  - Total: 4.15 km^{2} (1.60 sq mi)
- Elevation: 228 m (748 ft)

Population (2026-01-01)
  - Total: 359
  - Density: 86.5/km^{2} (224/sq mi)
- Time zone: UTC+1 (CET)
  - Summer (DST): UTC+2 (CEST)
- Postal code: 533 04
- Website: www.obec-chotec.cz

Choteč is a municipality and village in Pardubice District in the Pardubice Region of the Czech Republic. It has about 400 inhabitants.

== Demographics ==
Historical population
Year	Pop.	±%
1869	259	—
1880	276	+6.6%
1890	352	+27.5%
1900	330	−6.2%
1910	314	−4.8%
1921	343	+9.2%
1930	317	−7.6%
1950	266	−16.1%
1961	270	+1.5%
1970	270	+0.0%
1980	267	−1.1%
1991	252	−5.6%
2001	274	+8.7%
2011	309	+12.8%
2021	359	+16.2%
Source: Censuses
