= Strahov Monastery =

Premonstratensian abbey in Prague, Czech Republic

Coordinates: 50.086°N 14.390°E

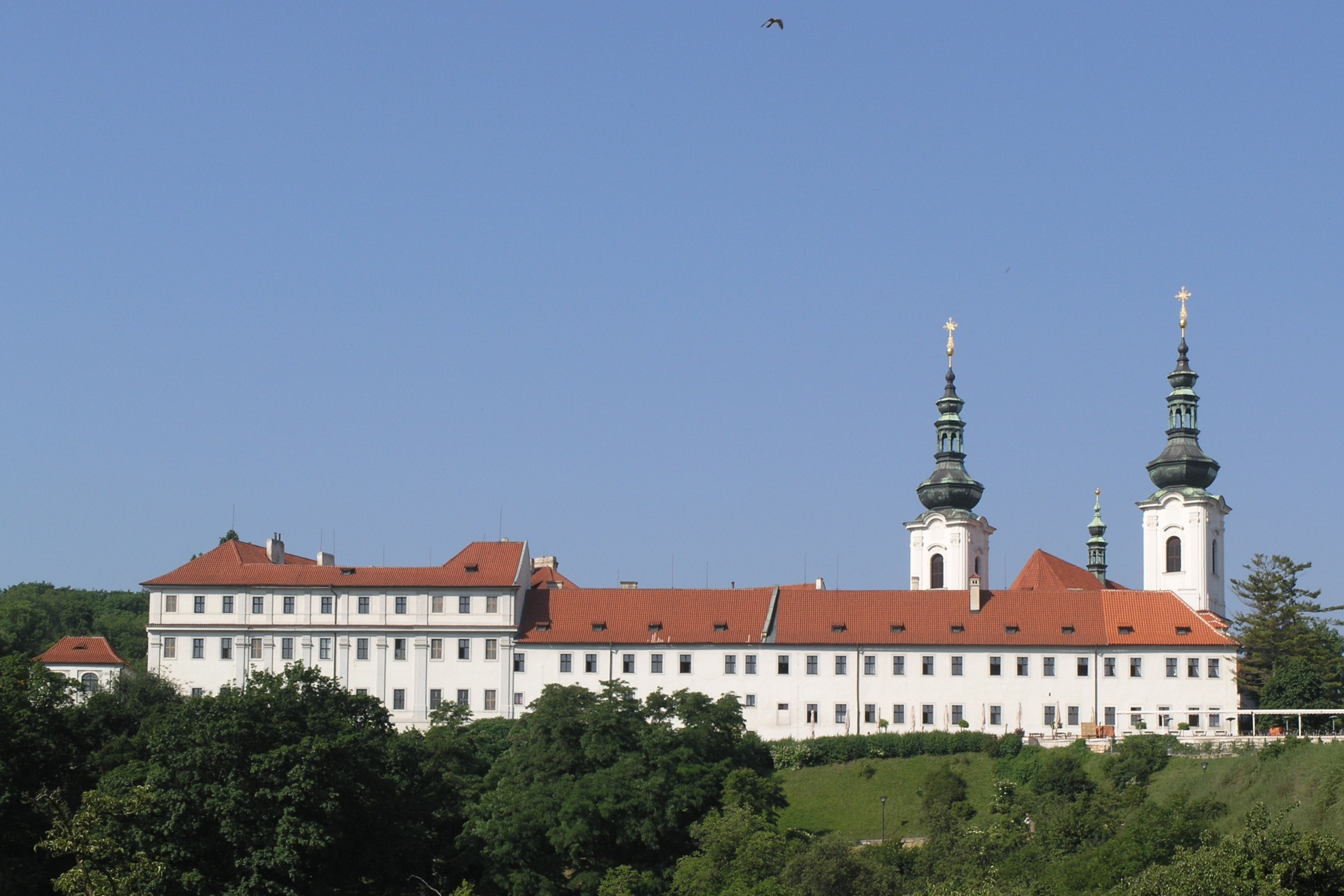
View of Strahov Monastery from Úvoz street.

Strahov Monastery (Czech: Strahovský klášter) is a Premonstratensian abbey founded in 1143 by Jindřich Zdík, Bishop John of Prague, and Vladislaus II, Duke of Bohemia. It is located in Strahov, Prague, Czech Republic.

== History ==
=== The founding of a monastery ===
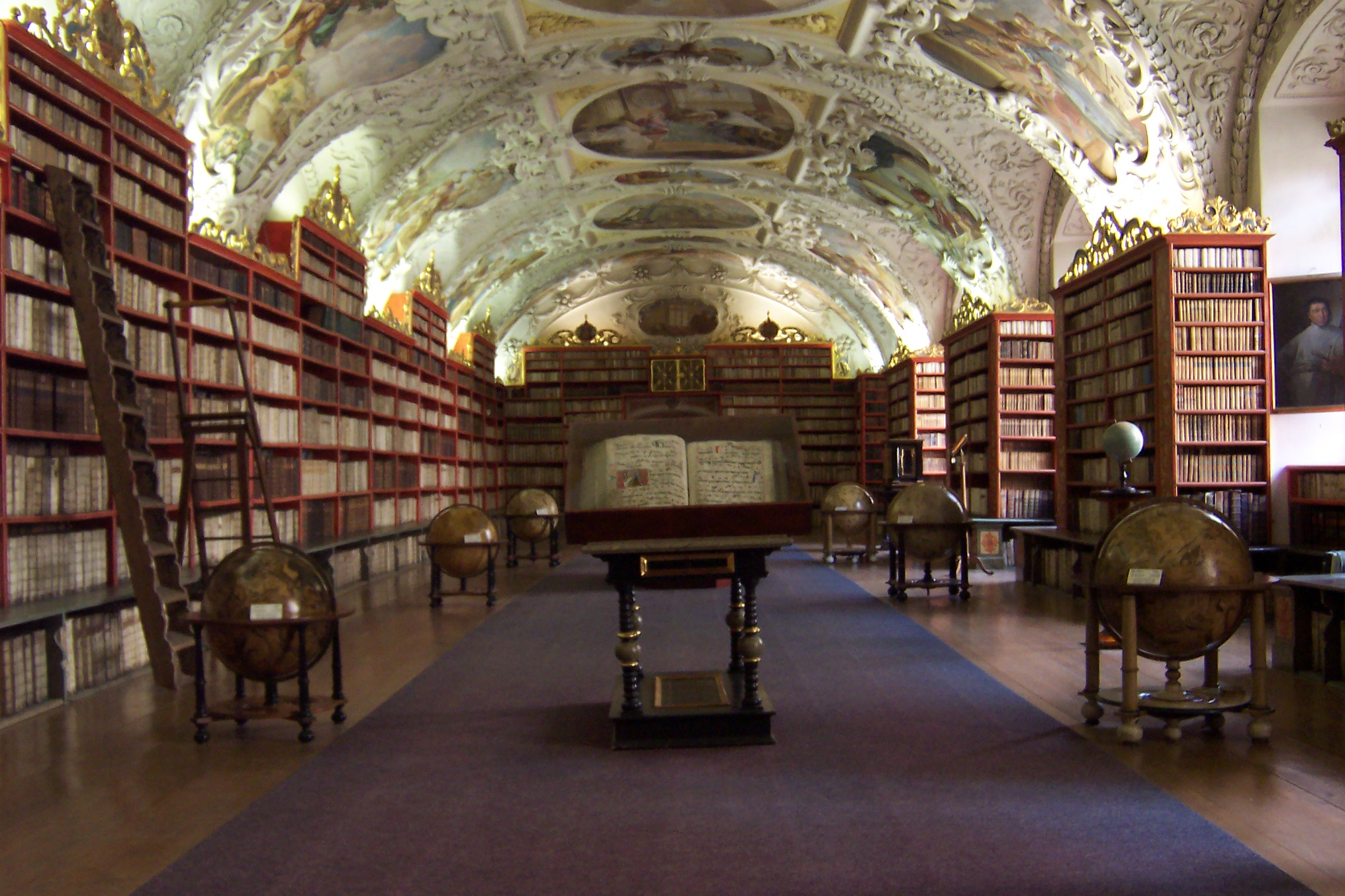
Library of Strahov Monastery

After his pilgrimage to the Holy Land in 1138, the bishop of Olomouc, Jindřich Zdík, took hold of the idea of founding a monastery of regular canons in Prague. He had the support of the bishops of Prague and Soběslav I, Duke of Bohemia and—after his death—Vladislav II. After Zdík's first unsuccessful attempt to found a Czech variant of the canons' order at the place called Strahov in 1140, an invitation was issued to the Premonstratensians, whose first representatives arrived from Steinfeld in the Rhine valley (now Germany).

The monks began to build their monastery first of wood, with a Romanesque basilica as the center of all spiritual events in Strahov. The building was gradually completed and the construction of the monastery stone buildings continued, in order to replace the provisional wooden living quarters with permanent stone. In 1258, the monastery was heavily damaged by fire and later renewed.

=== During the Hussite Wars ===
The monastery continued functioning until the period of the Hussites, when it was attacked and plundered by the citizens of Prague in 1420. Books, articles of worship, and the furnishings of both church and convent were burned. Although the building did not sustain great damage from an architectural viewpoint, the monastery took a long time to recover.

During the Hussite Wars, the years of the reign of George of Poděbrady, and the time up to the end of the 16th century, Strahov was relatively moribund. Attempts were made by various officials to renew the original monastery and its religious life, but they were unsuccessful.

It was not until the arrival of the abbot Jan Lohelius that a turn came about. This cleric, originally of Teplá Abbey, became the abbot of Strahov in 1586 and all his abilities were devoted to the renewal of Strahov. He tried to raise the spiritual life of the monastery and, as a visitator circarie of the Premonstratensian order as a whole in Bohemia, he also devoted attention to the material aspect of things. He reconstructed the church, renewed the abbey buildings, established workshops, built a new dormitory and refectory, and had the monastery gardens newly laid out. He regained many of the monastery estates in order to build up the material base of the monastery, providing funds for the institution's maintenance and further development. Thanks to his untiring activity, by 1594—only eight years after Lohelius's appointment—a twelve-member community of monks could live in the monastery once more.

=== During the Thirty Years' War ===
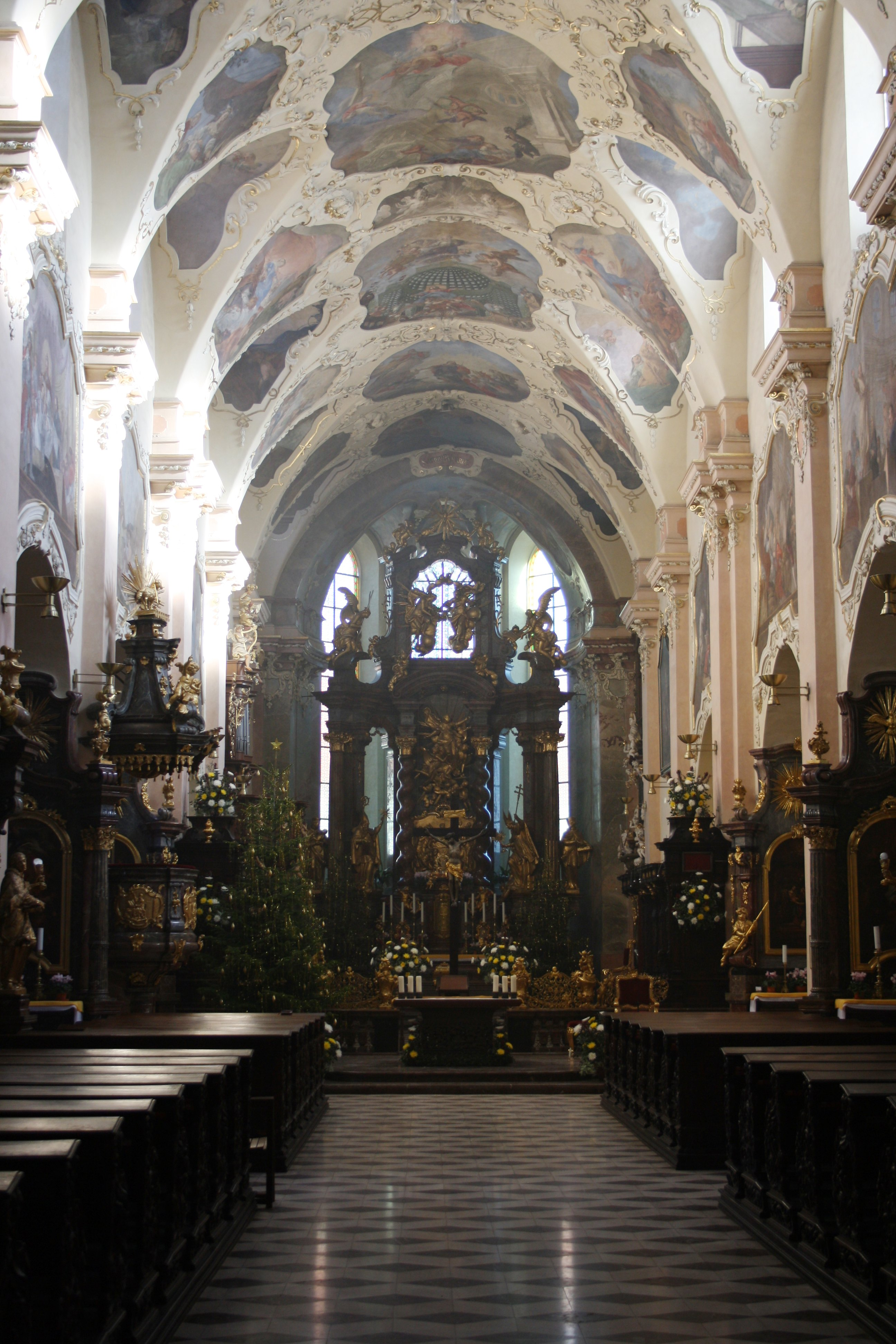
Basilica of the Assumption of Our Lady is the main cloister church

In 1612 Jan Lohelius became the archbishop of Prague, his work at Strahov then being continued by the new abbot, Kašpar Questenberg. He continued in the expensive work started by Lohelius, completed the lower cloisters and prelature, and even erected a new building in the form of St. Elizabeth's Hospital, as well as adding out-buildings and a brewery. Furthermore, he founded the Norbertine seminary in the New Town, which was intended for the theological studies of members of the order. All this was achieved during the Thirty Years' War, when Kašpar Questenberg himself was forced by the violence to flee from Prague. The financial account of the costs incurred by his building activities amounted to about 100,000 tolars, which at that time was a very respectable sum for any building work. In this respect, Kašpar Questenberg's expenditures were comparable with such builders as his contemporary Albrecht von Wallenstein.

One of the biggest events in the history of the Premonstratensian order was the transfer of the remains of Norbert of Xanten, the founder of the order, from Magdeburg. The reinterring took place under Questenberg's abbacy. This came about in 1627, and since then the remains of the saintly founder have laid at rest in the abbey church. During Questenberg's time, the Church of Saint Roch was also completed. Originally it was a votive church whose construction was started by Rudolf II, Holy Roman Emperor, in 1602 as an expression of thanks for the end of the plague in 1599. After numerous changes of fortune the church was completed, including its interior, by 1630.

When Kašpar Questenberg died in 1640 his successor was Kryšpin Fuk, who continued in his work. Moreover, he gained renown for himself through his participation in the making of the Vltava navigable in the sector called St John's Rapids (Svatojánské proudy). During this period the abbey was plundered by troops of the Swedish Empire towards the end of the Thirty Years' War. The church and the library were looted. After the departure of the Swedes, Kryšpin Fuk had the damaged abbey repaired again, his work being continued by the Abbots Ameluxen, Sutor, and Franck. The last-mentioned had the prelature reconstructed and a new St. Elizabeth's Hospital built, because the original one built by Kašpar Questenberg was demolished during the construction of Baroque fortifications in Prague.

=== The Theological Hall ===
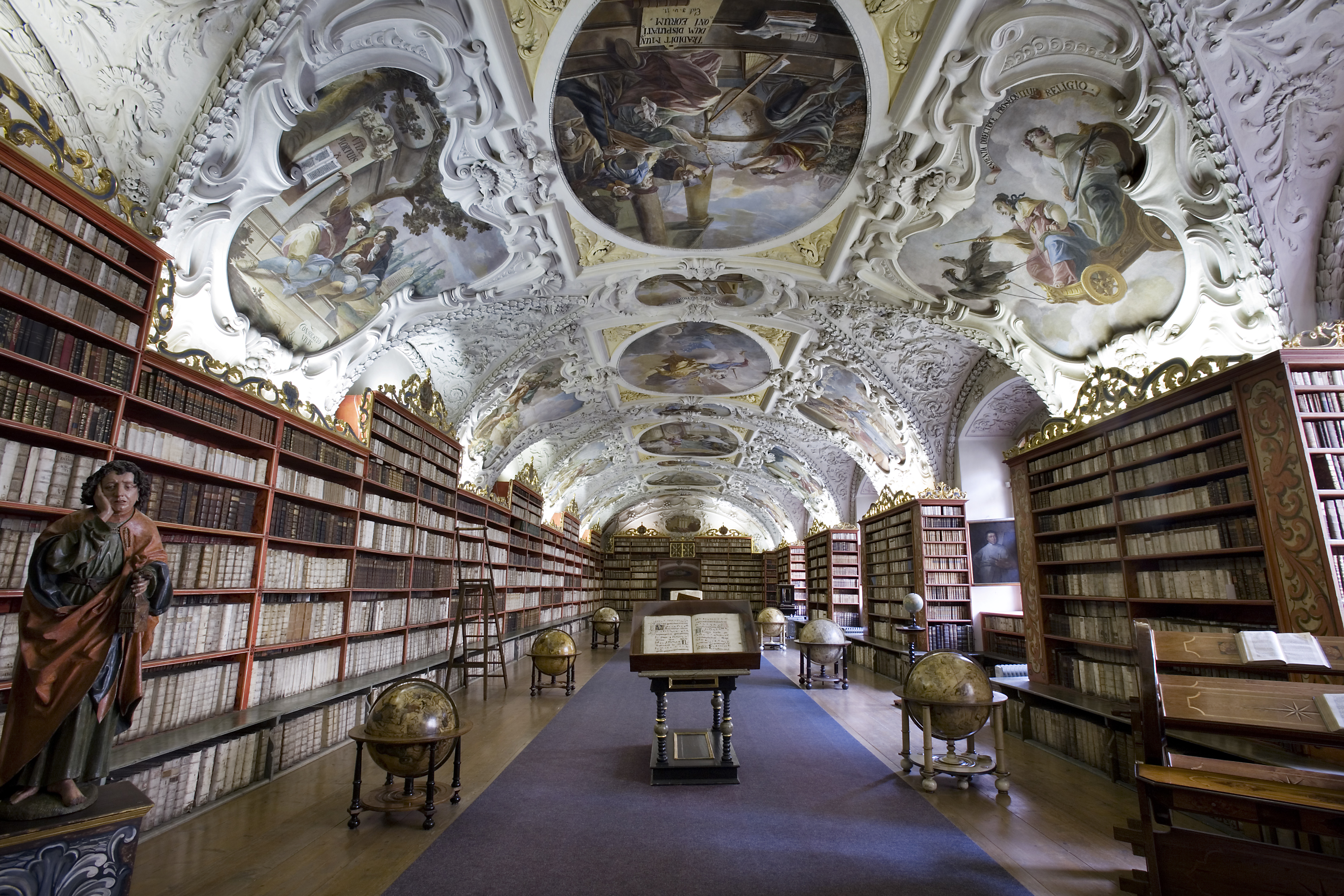
The Theological Hall with stucco decoration and paintings from 1720s

In 1670 Jeroným Hirnheim, a philosopher and theologian, became the abbot of Strahov. His greatest work, which has survived to the present day, was the building of a new library in the so-called Theological Hall (Teologický sál), completed in 1679. During the 17th and early 18th centuries, other abbots continued the reconstruction of the monastery. They also cared for the church, which was repaired and decorated several times during the given period. The monastery experienced other significant building activity, namely after the assaults of French and Bavarian troops in 1742, when Prague was bombarded and seriously damaged. The abbot then organized building efforts anew, in the course of which the church was rebuilt along with the monastery area.

After 1950, the library was incorporated into the Memorial of National Literature. Following events of 1989 the library was, along with the monastery, returned to the Premonstratensians. Within the library, a reading room is also open. The Strahov Library contains over 200,000 volumes, including over 3,000 manuscripts and 1,500 first prints stored in a special depository. It is considered one of the world's most valuable and preserved libraries, with ceilings adorned with frescoes by Siard Nosecky and Anton Maulbertsch.

=== The Philosophical Hall ===
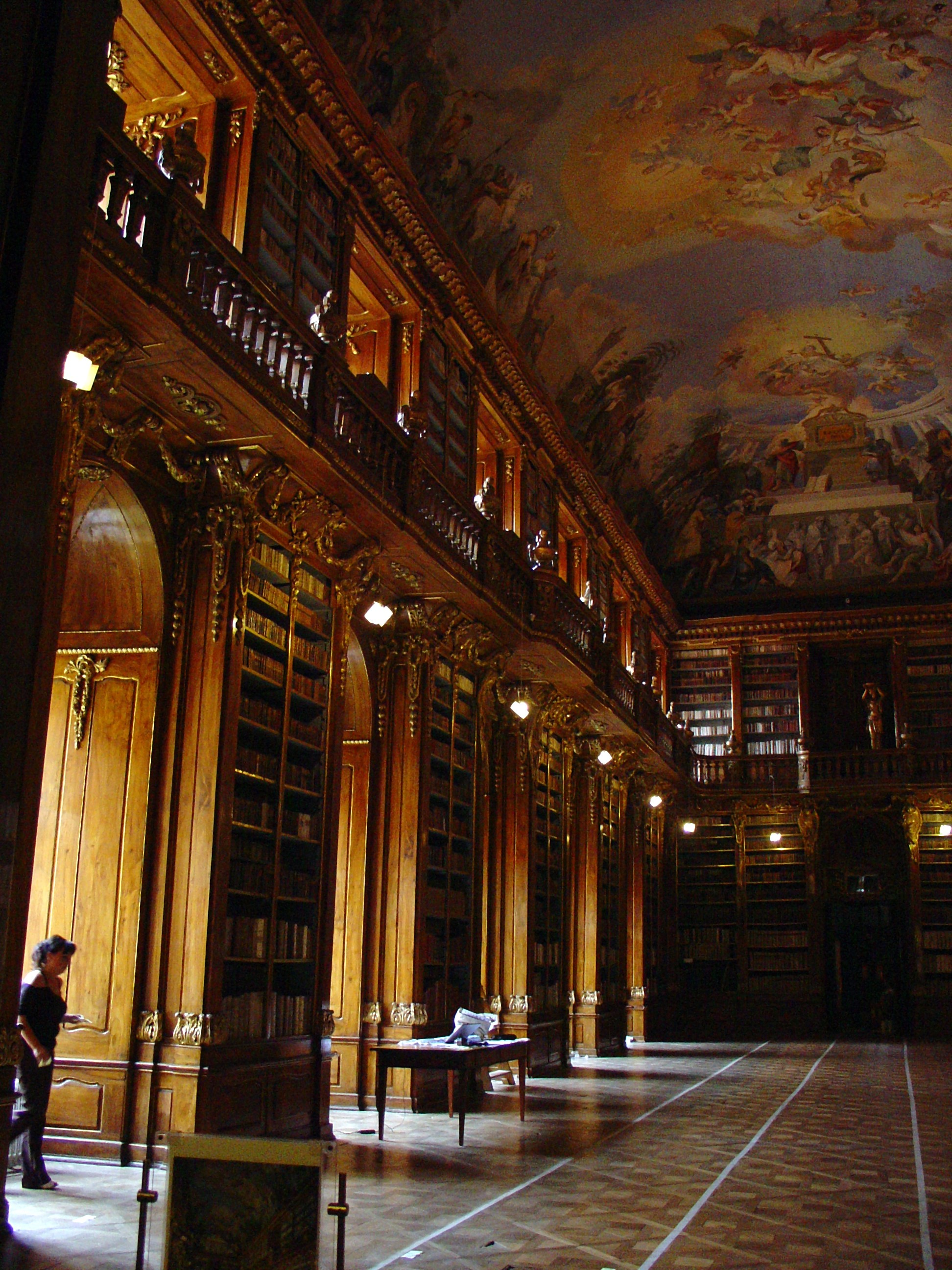
The Philosophical Hall, built for the books coming from the southern Moravian Louka Convent (abolished in 1784)

In 1779 Václav Mayer occupied the abbot's throne and was the last to carry out great building activities. His most outstanding work was the building of the new library, now in Classical style. Today it is called the Philosophical Hall (Filosofický sál). This work brought the extensive building activity at Strahov Monastery to an end and the following generations of abbots devoted their attention merely to minor architectural repairs, all under the influence of contemporary fashion, and to maintenance of the area as a whole.

The monastery survived in this way until 1950, when it was taken over by the communist regime, the religious being interned and placed in civil employment, very few of them being able to work in the clerical administration as priests of the diocese. The monastery was subjected to thorough archaeological research and transformed into the Memorial of National Literature. In the course of the said archaeological research the long since forgotten Romanesque form of the monastery was revealed and reconstructed in a sensitive way.

=== After the Velvet Revolution ===
After the fall of the communist regime in 1989, the monastery was returned to the Premonstratensian Order, which began to realize a costly reconstruction of the building. By 1994 the church had been restored, a new technical network constructed, the Strahov picture gallery newly built, and the Strahov library renewed. Other architectural restorations were also carried out.

== Burials ==
- Vladislaus II, Duke of Bohemia
- Johann Lohel
- Saint Norbert of Xanten

== Gallery ==
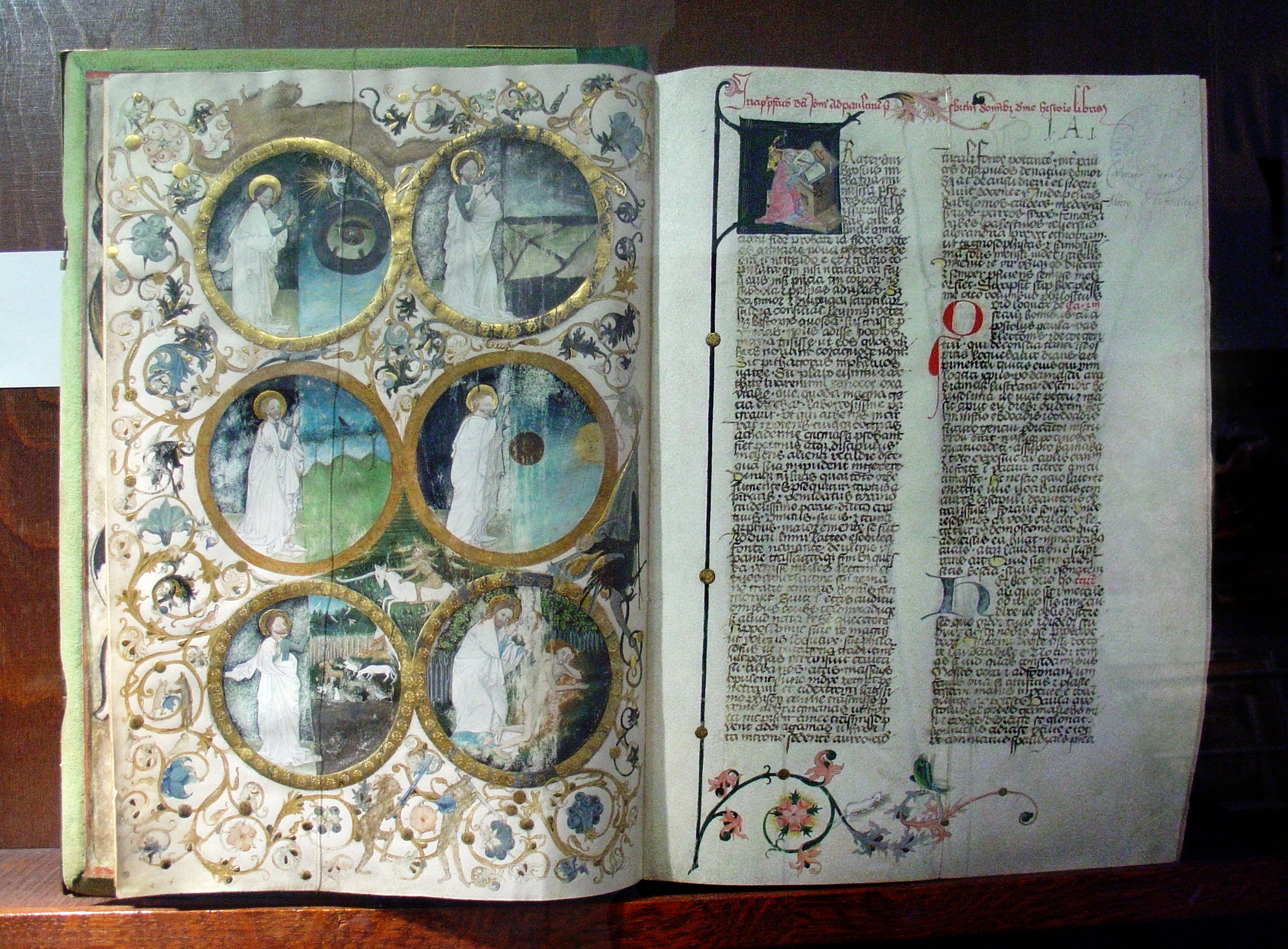
1440 Jan of Šelmberk's bible, on exhibition in Strahov Monastery's library

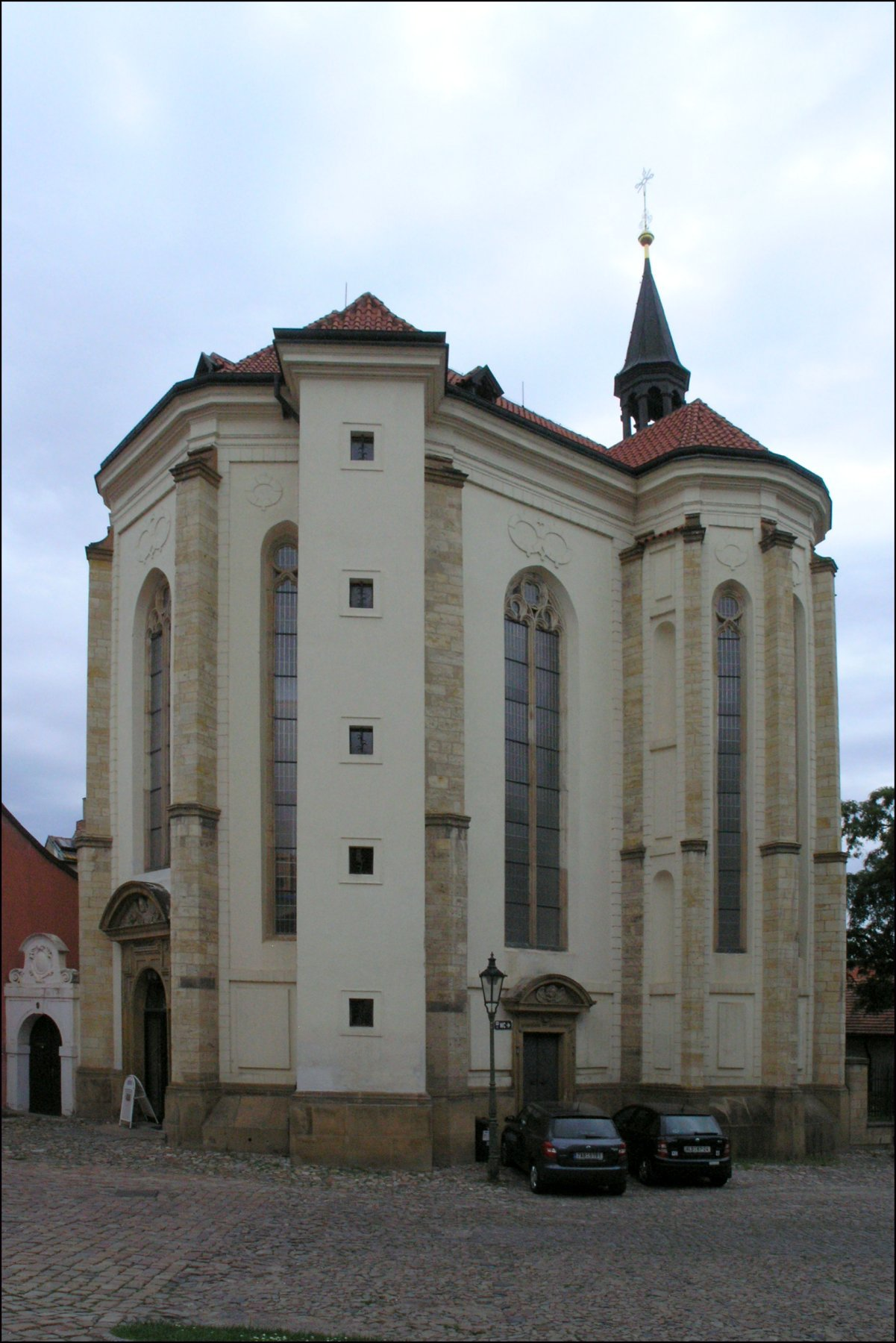
Church of St. Rochus

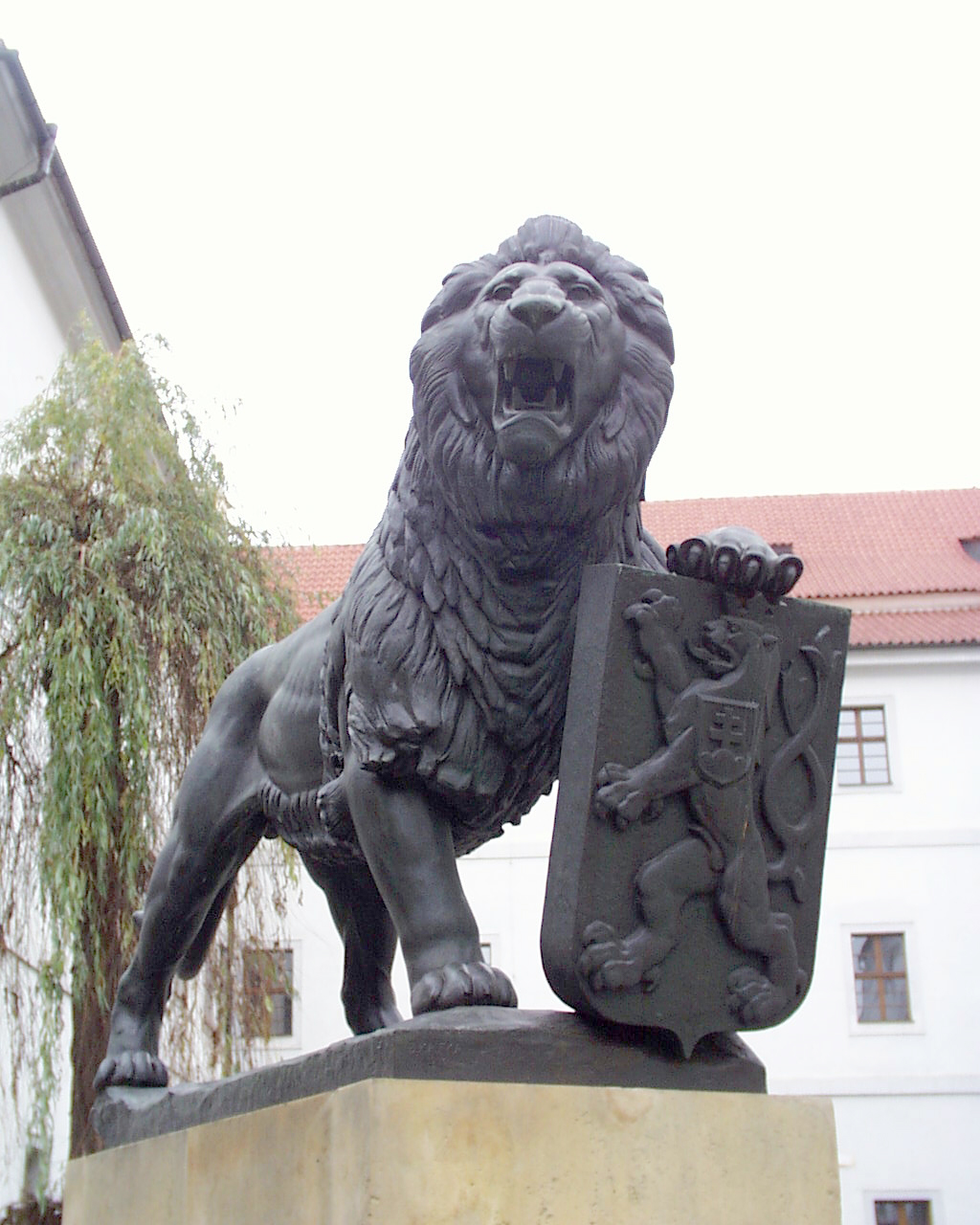
Lion holding Czechoslovak arms

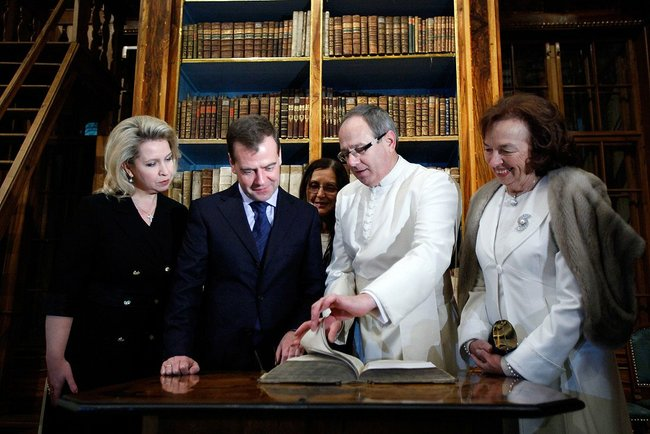
Medvedev in Strahov Monastery library (2011)

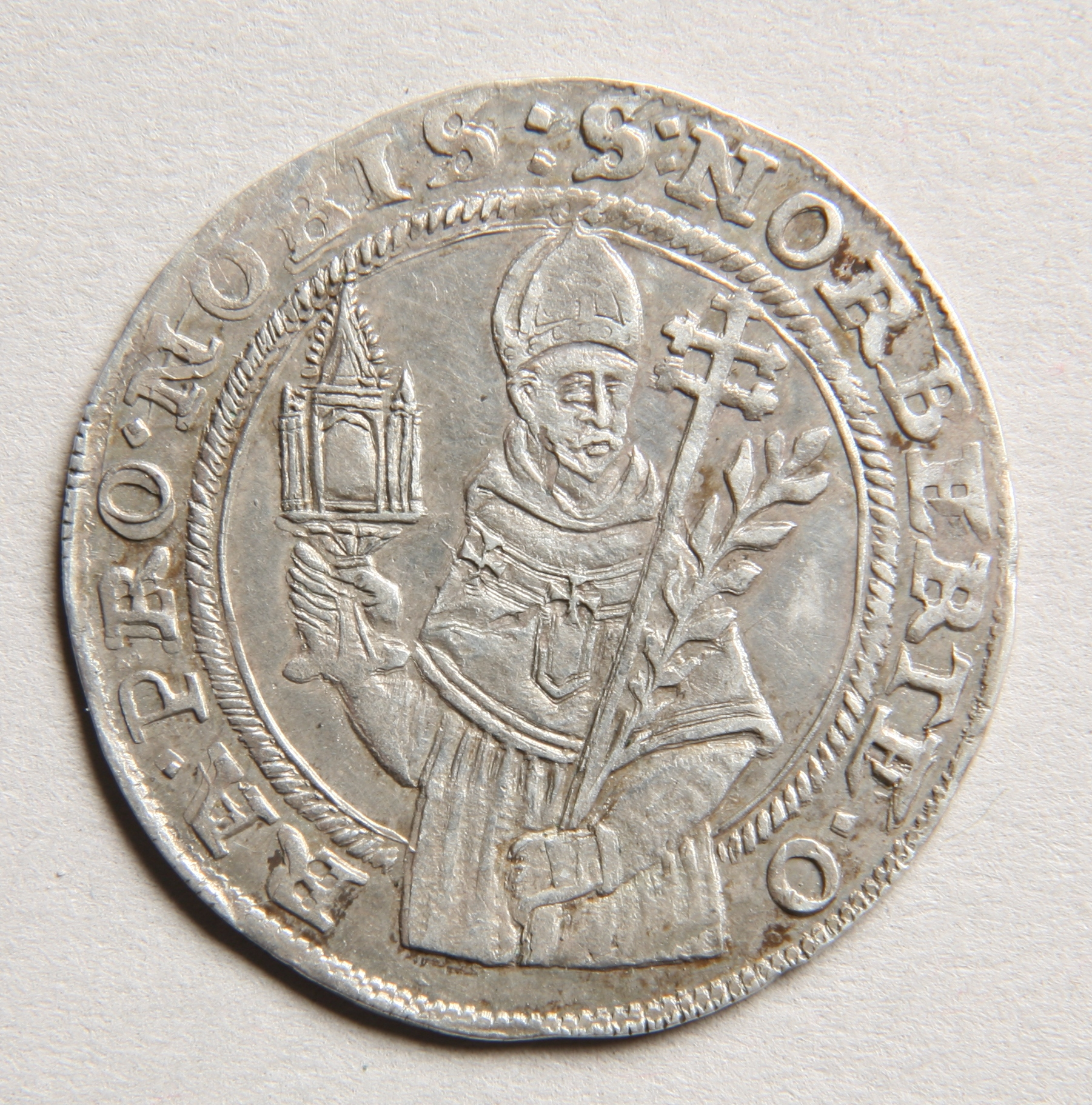
Medal commemorating translation of Norbert's body to Prague in 1627

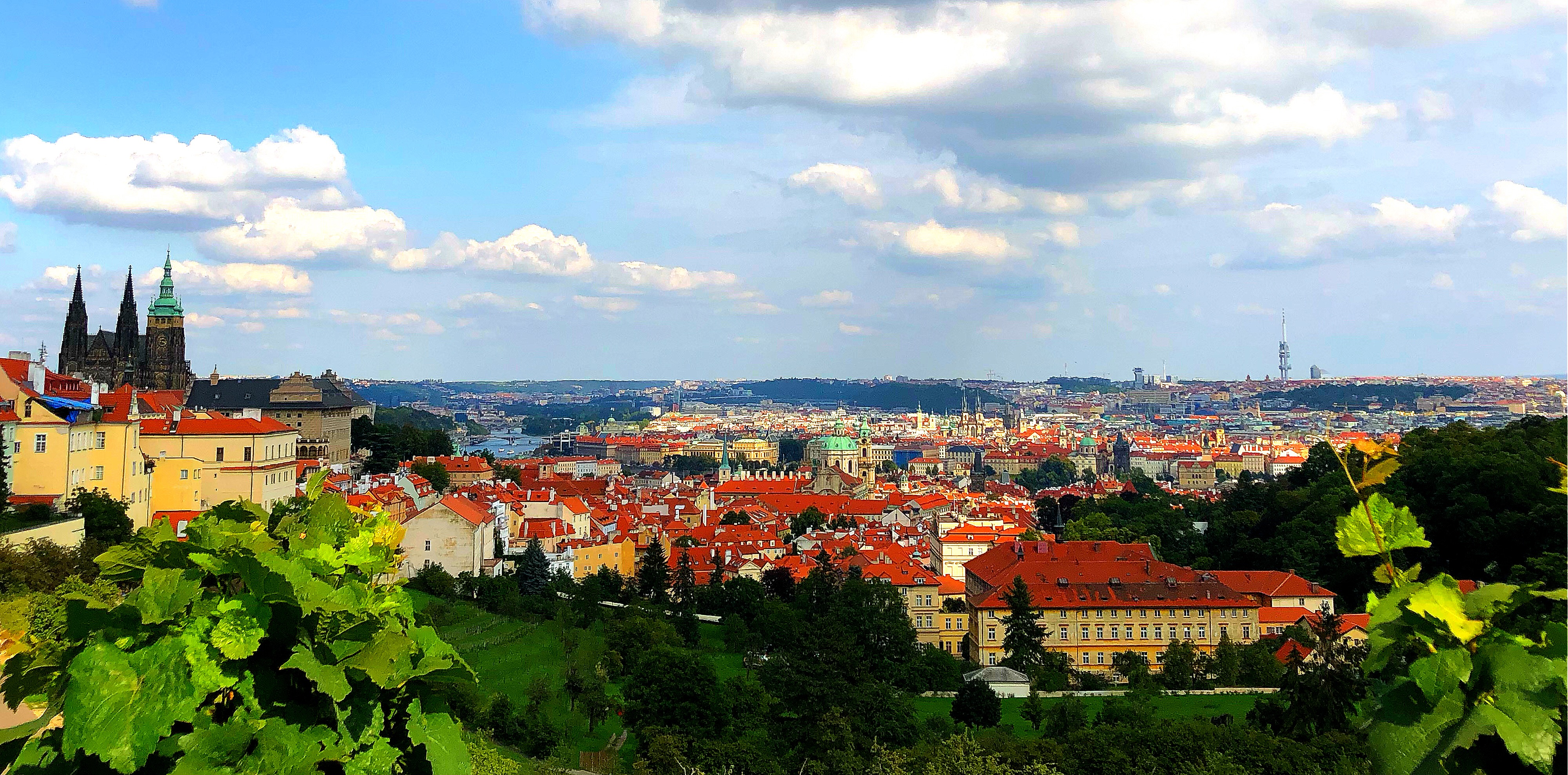
View from Strahov Monastery
