= František Adolf Šubert =

Czech writer, playwright and journalist

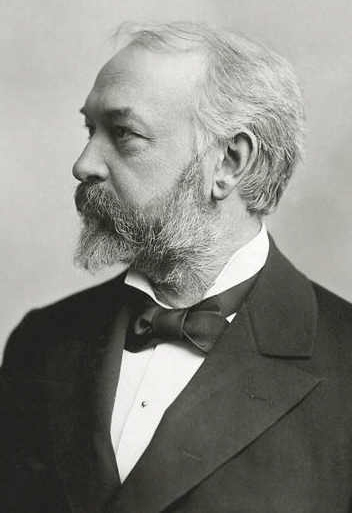
František Adolf Šubert in 1915

František Adolf Šubert (sometimes spelled Schubert; 27 March 1849 – 8 September 1915) was a Czech writer, playwright, journalist and theatre director. He was the first director of the National Theatre in Prague.

== Childhood and youth ==
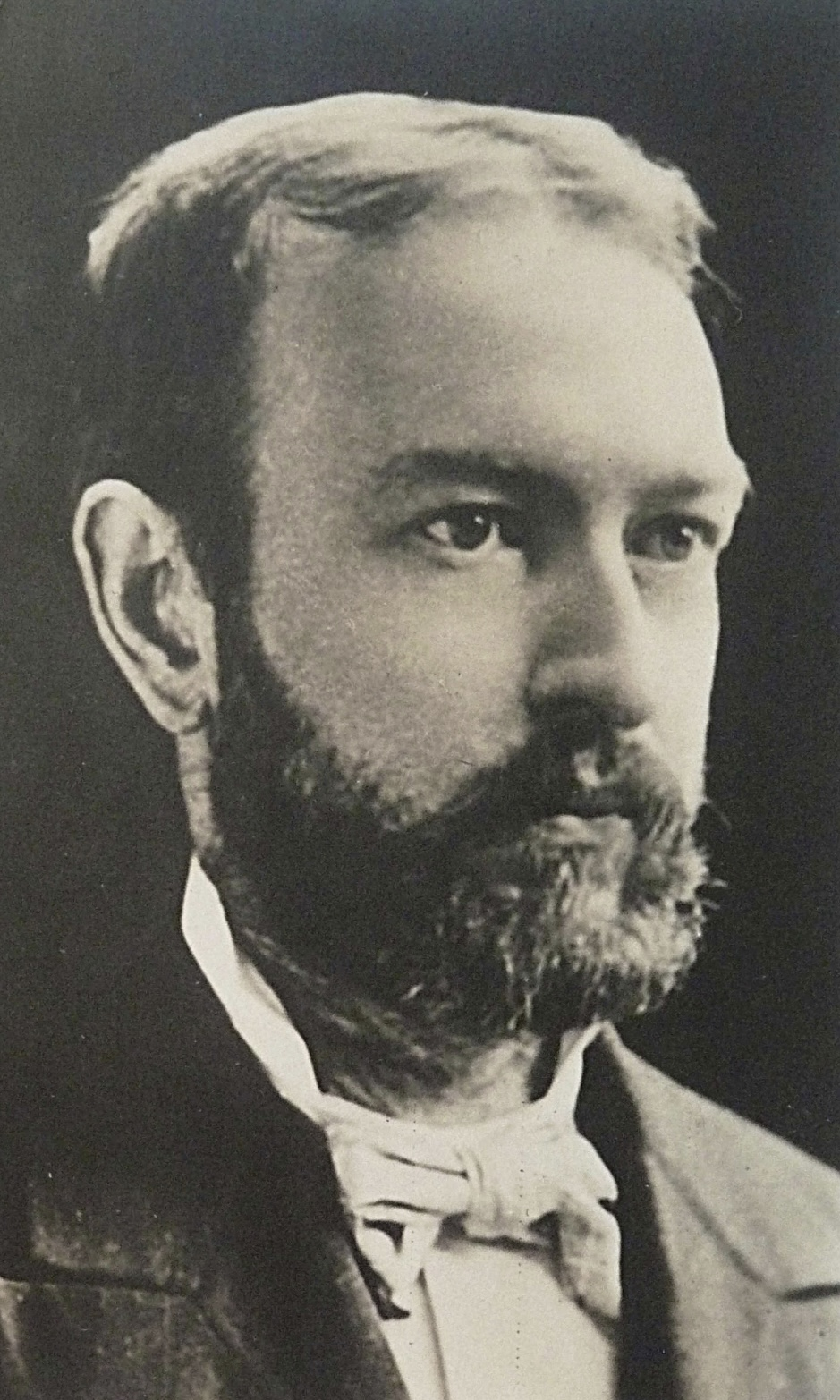
František Adolf Šubert at young age

Šubert was born on 27 March 1849 in Dobruška in eastern Bohemia. He was born as the ninth (and youngest) child in a poor family of a saddler and upholsterer, later inn-keeper and head of a tobacco warehouse. According to his parents' wishes, he was to become a priest.

Since childhood, he was keen on reading. "He didn't need to frolic either indoors or outdoors. Even less so at school. He wouldn't roam around, climb trees, or look for and pick birds' nests." He studied at the college in Hradec Králové, where he wrote his first literary works, historical short stories, epic poems, and dramas. He later studied classical philology, philosophy, literature and art history at the University of Prague.

Soon after, he joined the Old Czech Party under the leadership of František Ladislav Rieger. Šubert and Rieger became lifelong friends, sharing mutual respect and support. He started working as a journalist. From 1875 he became a secretary of Český klub (Czech Club – a parliamentary association in the Austrian Imperial Council, which united Czech political representation).

In this period, he wrote two historical plays: Probuzenci (The Awoken) taking place in the 18th century and a biographical drama about the Czech Renaissance knight Petr Vok from Rožmberk.

== Becoming the director of the National Theatre ==
In March 1883 after the abdication of director Jan Nepomuk Maýr, the board of trustees of the National Theatre elected Šubert as his successor.

Other candidates were opera academy director Jan Ludvík Lukes, and theatre director and former head of drama section in the Provisional Theatre Pavel Švanda ze Semčic. Šubert was a protege of F. L. Rieger, and Rieger used his influence to lobby for Šubert. Rieger hoped that, via Šubert, he could to retain a certain influence on the decision-making process of the National Theatre. At least in the first years of Šubert's office, Rieger's influence on the management, repertoire and engagement of artists of the National Theatre, where he had been present from its very beginnings, was very strong, even decisive.

He became the first director of the National Theatre and held this position for seventeen years, until 1900. He was responsible for the financial management and artistic direction of both drama and opera (he was the only manager of the National Theatre who simultaneously held all three positions). However, his authority was limited by the board of trustees, which basically had the same power as the director.

== Leading the first Czech stage ==
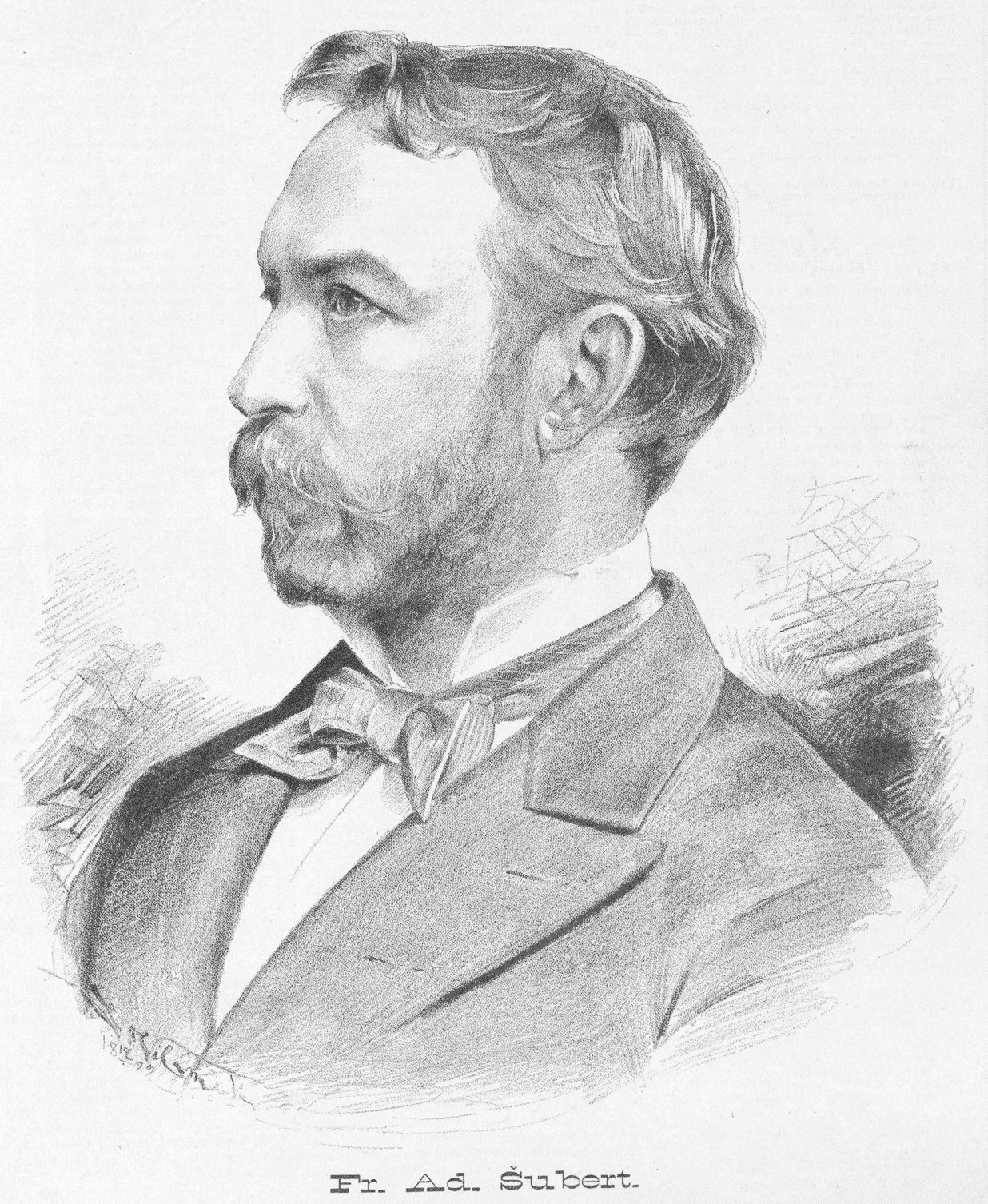
Šubert in 1882

The politically selected and elected manager fulfilled his function mainly organizationally, rather than artistically. Šubert was handsome and looked majestic. He lacked theater experience, perspective and the ability to navigate in an environment full of such strong artistic individuals, for which he had neither patience nor understanding. But he understood the representative, external role of the theater in a revived nation, as well as the prestige he gained as a director.

Šubert tried to establish a prominent position for the theater in Europe. He invited a number of world opera and drama stars. Thanks to his diplomatic talent, he promoted the first performance of Verdi's opera Otello north of the Alps. In 1888, Otello recorded a great response among the Prague audience and the opera reached 26 reprises.

Šubert became famous for his extraordinary initiative, hard work and organizational skills, with which, as the first Czech theatre director of a permanent theatre building, he was able to manage the theatre in relative stability. He was a workaholic and very conscientious and capable of diplomatic negotiation. In that day, there was no precedent, nor a Czech person with adequate experience, because such an institution did not exist in Czech society until then, and Czech national pride did not allow to outsource know-how from abroad, which would mean primarily German-speaking theatres. He handled all operational issues himself, which shows his inability to delegate tasks. Jaroslav Kvapil, the man who replaced him in the drama department of the National Theater after seventeen years, wrote about him in his memoirs: “Šubert's situation was disadvantageous due to the great responsibility and then new tasks, for which he sometimes lacked the experience and abilities, but on the other hand it was advantageous due to the unique position he had in our entire theatrical life without a rival or competition and, moreover, in the shadow of the mighty figure of Rieger. What a wonder that Šubert became complacent, if not conceited.” However, Kvapil also recognized Šubert's ability to maintain a difficult cultural and economic situation: "There was a lack of everything, especially a lack of audience and original productions, the excess was only in expectations and demands." Given that the National Theatre functioned as the only theatre venue in Czech Bohemia, there was no competition or comparison, but at the same time there was a strong expectation that the Czech theatre would occupy a strong position in Europe. This expectation soon receded and the new goal was to find a direction for the Czech theatre that would be artistically and practically productive (i.e. creation of original dramas and interest of Czech audience).

For almost the entire time of his leadership, Šubert struggled with financial collapse of the theatre. The National Theatre was largely dependent on ticket revenue, and interest in their productions was not as great as Czech patriots had originally expected. Compared to the Provisional Theatre, it had almost twice the capacity and the most modern stage and lighting technology. The National Theatre until 1920 must be understood as a business project whose viability depended on an auditorium filled with paying spectators. And until 1920, the theatre purely a Czech patriotic business project whose viability depended on an auditorium filled with paying spectators.

Šubert demonstrated organizational talent and out-of-the-box thinking. He was the author of the concept of the so-called "theatre trains" – a completely organized trip to the National Theatre, which often included an overnight stay. This concept became extremely popular. In 1884, even 184 patriots from the United States arrived on the "theatre ship". Theatre trains brought in more profit than the income from theatre boxes.

However, the theatre trains stopped making a profit over time and Šubert had to solve the crisis by introducing popular entertainment. The drama failed to attract attention of the audience. For example, most of William Shakespeare's major works have been performed a maximum of four times (Macbeth, The Merchant of Venice). Only A Midsummer Night's Dream, which stood out for its large romantic stage design and many scantily clad actresses and ballerinas in the roles of fairies, had twenty eight reruns within the first year. This show was also a theatre train hit, because it was a well made mainstream comedy production and most of the National Theatre stars were cast in it.

The financial crisis forced Šubert to take probably the most controversial step of his career. In 1891, Šubert, in cooperation with Angelo Neumann, the director of the Prague German Theatre, asked Emperor Francis Joseph I to transform both national theatres in Prague into court theatres. If the emperor had agreed (he refused because he did not want to invest more money in other theatres), the largest patriotic project of the Czech nation would have come under the patronage of the House of Habsburg.

Šubert's sympathies for workers and workers' associations were provocative. While some of the theater's shareholders wanted to keep the first Czech stage for the economic elite, Šubert sought to make the theater affordable for the poorer classes as well.

== Power conflicts ==
Šubert was not a team player. He held all the power himself. The board of trustees had the same powers as him, but did not interfere much in the management of the theatre. His only artistic collaborator was playwright and dramaturg Ladislav Stroupežnický, an important person of the first years of Šubert's management, who became his right-hand man till his death in 1892.

Although the director's position was solid mainly thanks to the political lobby of Rieger, theater insiders tried twice to limit his power. Each time they were defeated and Šubert used them as a warning example for others who would try to confront his authority.

In 1894, in the second year of the National Theatre's existence, stage director Antonín Pulda, tutor and lover of the actress Maria Pospischil, tried to take more power over the theater's dramaturgical and artistic direction. Both were dismissed and left to pursue careers in German theaters.

In 1895, the board of trustees, headed by the chairman of the board, attorney Jan Růžička, tried to limit Šubert's influence. Mutual intolerance culminated in Růžička's attempt to return Maria Pospischil in 1895. Again, unsuccessfully. Šubert provoked a national backlash against Pospischil in the press and in society, and the disgusted actress, who would want to return to her homeland, left for Germany again.

== Artistic visions ==
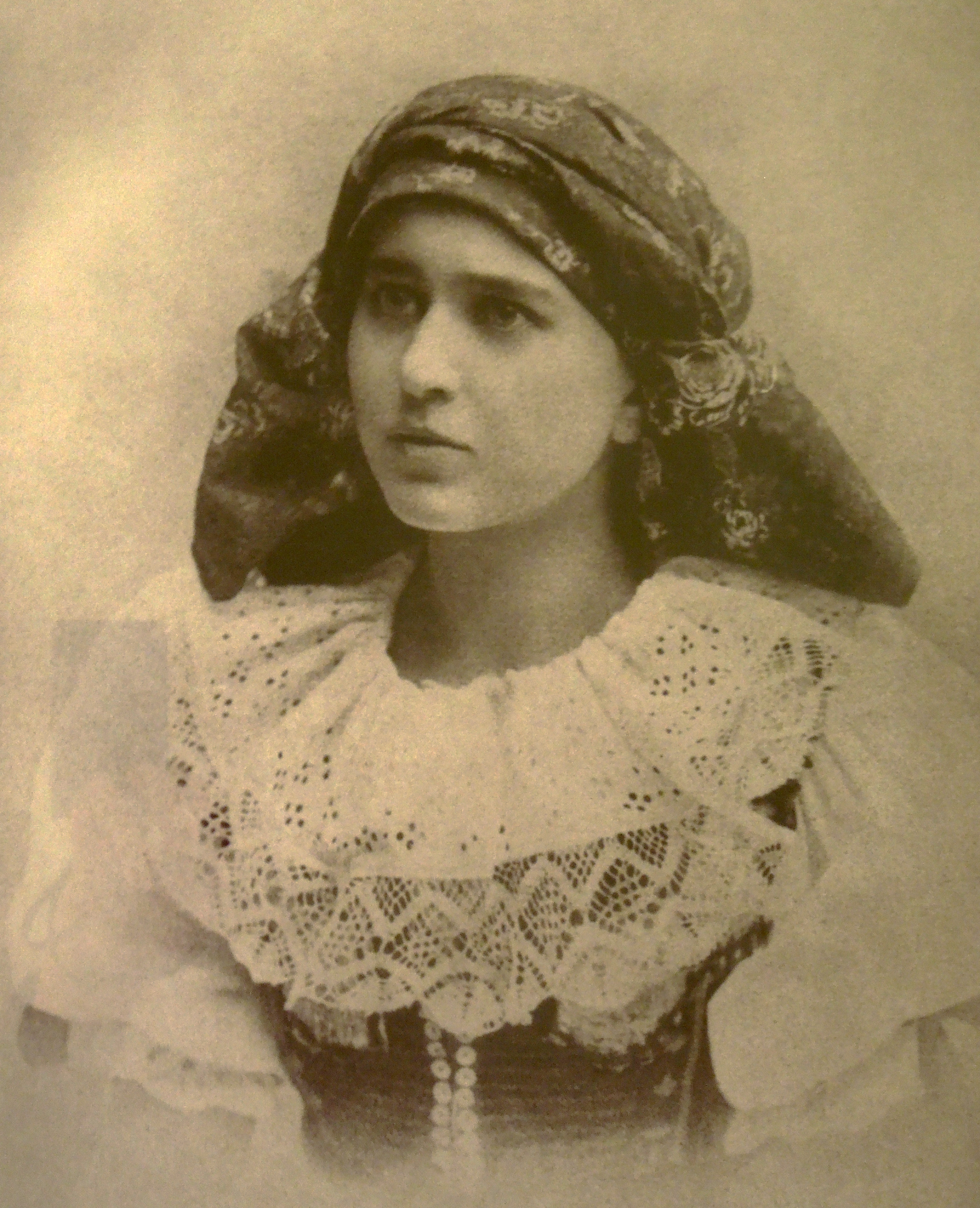
Actress Leopolda Dostalová as Maryša, the main role in one of the most important premieres of Šubert's era

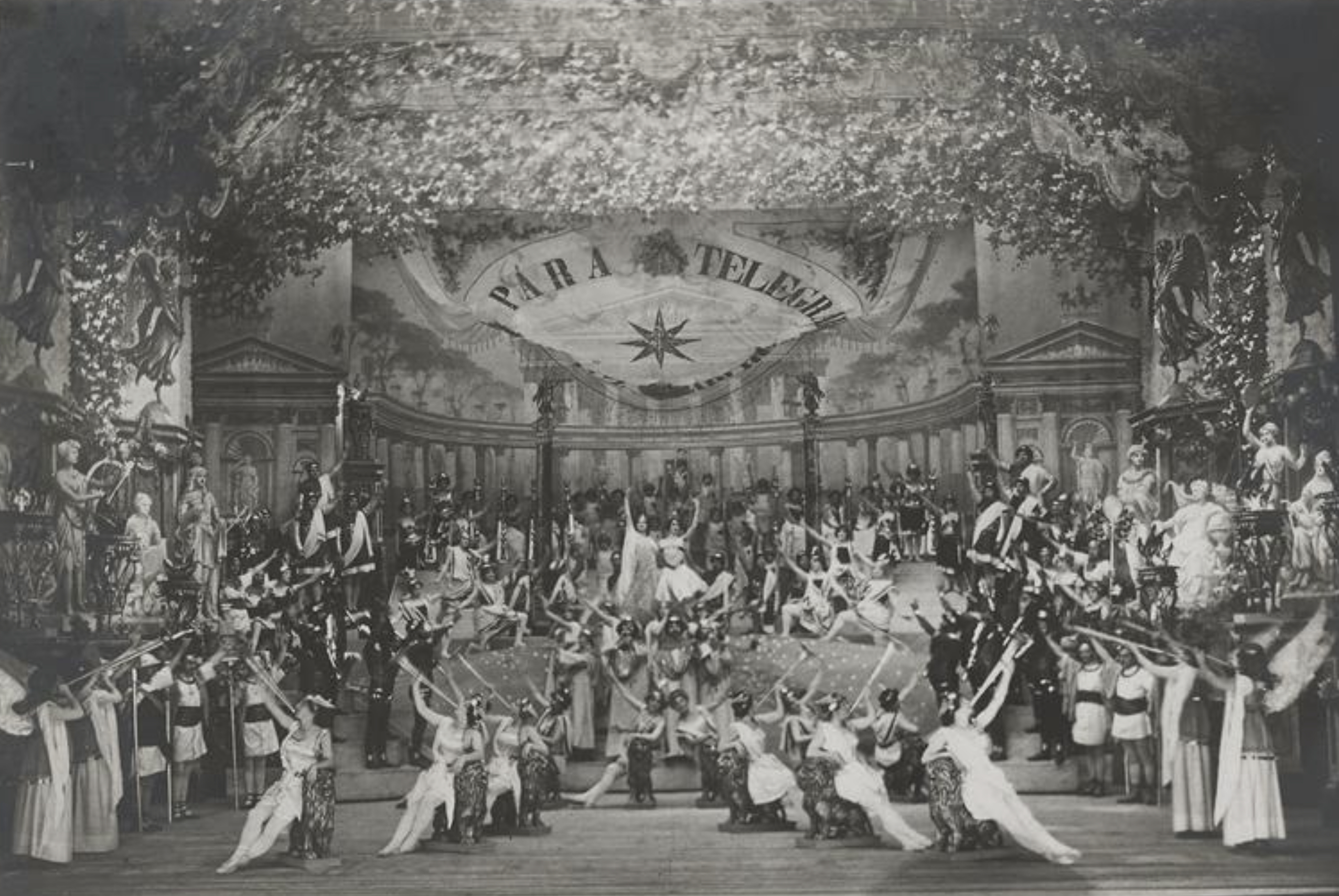
Ballet Excelsior – the most popular show of Šubert's era

Šubert was convinced that the National Theatre must contribute to the development of Czech culture and art, deepen its national character and care for the culture of the Czech language. This idea was received positively, but also as outdated. He was arguing about the repertoire with the Board of trustees, that focused on an economic point of view and promoted popular genres such as French melodramas, comedy plays and operettas.

For the first year and a half after the opening of the theater, until the performance of Goethe's Faust, German titles were not performed, as a demonstration of Czech artistic self-sufficiency. Šubert tended towards eclecticism and superficiality. His repertoire choices satisfied no one. In terms of European trends, the National Theater staggered behind touring companies that proved to be more progressive and in equally hard economic conditions. Pavel Švanda ze Semčic staged Ibsen's An Enemy of the People with Eduard Vojan and A Doll's House with Hana Kvapilová (these two actors of the National Theatre performed with touring companies in Czech regions to fulfill their artistic ambitions). Émile Zola, Maurice Maeterlinck, August Strindberg, Oscar Wilde did not appear in Šubert's program.

Šubert's dramaturgy was characterized as template-like, conventional, outdated and full of false pathos. Šubert strove for an inspiring national program. For example, he was a great supporter of the work of Václav Kliment Klicpera, whose plays he often presented. But both critics and audiences found them uninteresting and outworn. The Italian allegorical ballet Excelsior by Luigi Manzotti was repeatedly performed as a box office hit to make up for losses from other productions. This optimistic and opulent revue of simple dance numbers about the progress of human society and Industrial Revolution was harshly condemned by critics, but it was performed 170 times, being the most popular show of Šubert's era.

Some journalists openly criticized Šubert for not encouraging playwrights to create new Czech plays. When comparing the artistic quality of the Provisional Theatre and the National Theatre, they saw an artistic decline.

Over time, the most artistically successful achievements of this period seem to be dramas set in a Czech or Moravian village. However, there was neither clear artistic direction nor intellectual incentives. From this point of view, the National Theatre did not fulfill the "great task for the nation" that was expected from the very beginning of this project. The problem was partly in Šubert's personality. His ego (he was also a playwright) resented the success of others. The two biggest premieres of his era – Gabriela Preissová's drama Její pastorkyňa (also known as Jenůfa, an inspiration for the successful opera by Leoš Janáček) and tragedy Maryša by brothers Alois and Vilém Mrštík – found their way to the stage in an unconventional way. Preissová was Šubert's lover, or at least that was how she presented herself and the journey of her play to the National Theatre, and Maryša, after countless adjustments required by the directorate, was presented as a matinee – that is, in the afternoon. A reason for the inappropriate, or at least clumsy timing of the opening may be Šubert's doubt of a success of a raw village drama. The third major premiere of this period in 1887, Naši furianti (in English: Our Uppish and Defiant Fellows, also Our Swaggerers) by Ladislav Stroupežnický, did not receive a very warm reception at first.

The rising popularity of the village setting during this time (quite exceptionally compared to the rest of the continent) explains why Šubert's dramaturgy did not develop any relationship with the work of William Shakespeare, perhaps because of Renaissance roughness of the Bard. It did not go hand in hand with the contemporary taste, which enjoyed elegant declamation and socially noble gesture. Shakespeare's display of aristocrats and kings seemed to Czech theatergoers not very realistic, not very social or up-to-date. Molière's work was also rare (probably because Šubert tried to present his favorite Klicpera as the Czech comedy author number one.

== National Theatre at the International Music and Theatre Exhibition ==
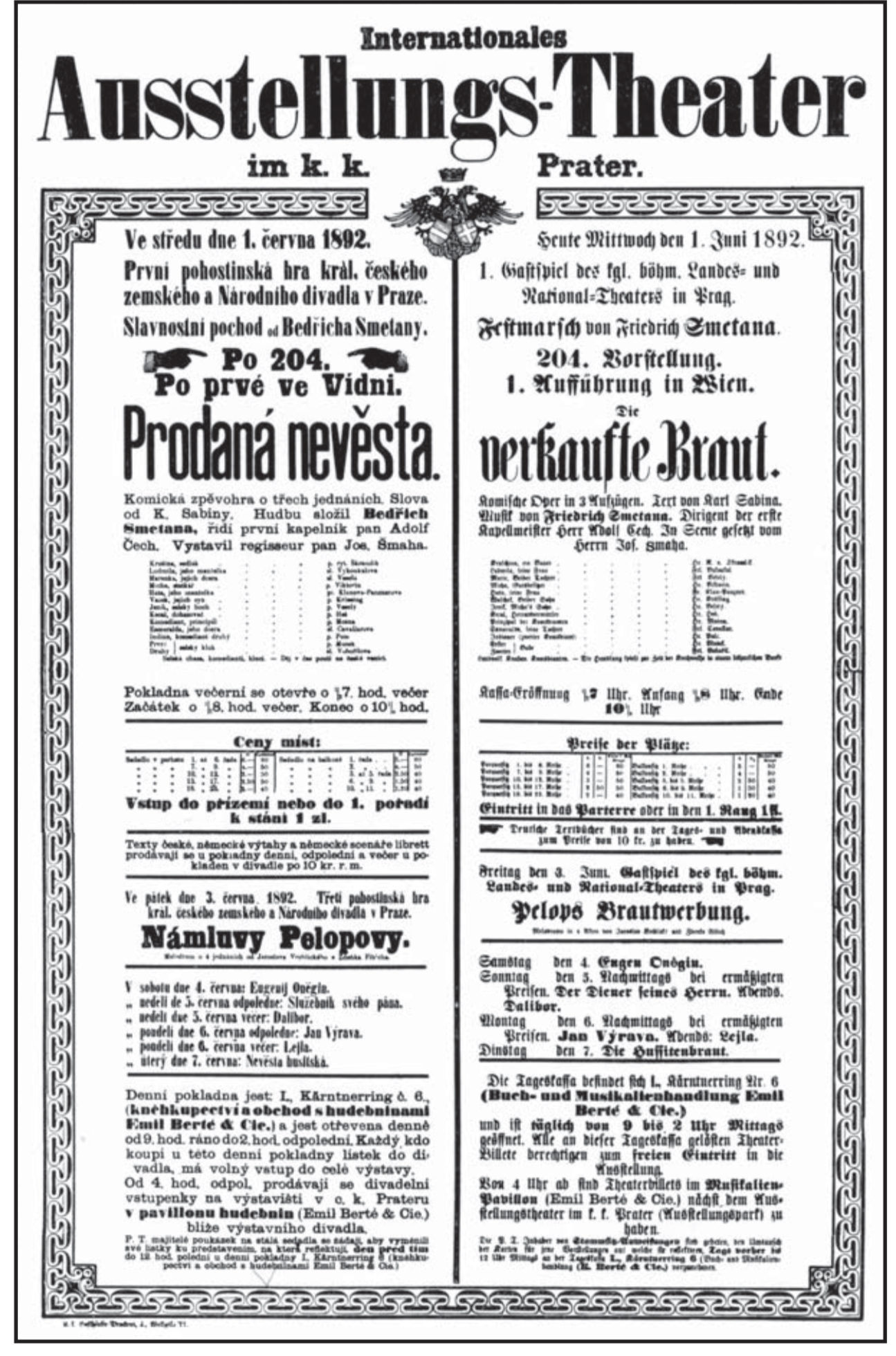
A poster of 1892 Viennese premiere of The Bartered Bride

In terms of international promotion, Šubert was thinking in a broader visionary framework and he was not afraid to risk. Invited by arts patron and music lover, Princess Pauline von Metternich, he was able to take advantage of a once-a-lifetime chance and organized a presentation of several Czech shows at the International Music and Theatre Exhibition (Wiener Musik- und Theaterausstellung) in Vienna in 1892 – a project many Czech representatives found too expensive or too risky. In a competition of Eleonora Duse starring in A Doll's House or Antony and Cleopatra, Comédie-Française or Deutsches Theater, also present at the exhibition, they didn't hope to draw any attention. "The Czechs arrived in Vienna as underdogs. The ensemble members traveled in second- and third-class train to minimize the financial risk." But the success of Czech theatre representation was immediate and immense, especially of Bedřich Smetana's opera The Bartered Bride, presented for the first time in Vienna. The reviewers found Smetana's music dynamic, and the libretto topical and poignant (not historic or allegorical as in many other operas). Next to two planned performances, two more had to be added to satisfy the enthusiasm of exhibition goers for the Czech opera. Another performance of the opera were Smetana's Dalibor and Dimitrij by Antonín Dvořák, Zdeněk Fibich's first part of his Hippodamia trilogy and Tchaikovsky's lyric opera Eugene Onegin opened in Prague in 1888 – all works unknown to wider music lovers west of the kingdom of Bohemia.

Both drama performances were mainly enjoyed by Viennese Czechs, who, however, regretted that the director did not cast the biggest star of the National Theatre, Otilie Sklenářová-Malá, born in Vienna herself, in the Viennese tour. One of the dramatic works was the historical drama Jan Výrava written by Šubert, who chose his own work – even though the National Theater had more progressive works in its repertoire – to perform in front of an international audience.

It was a great triumph for Šubert and the National Theatre and brought the music of the Czech composer Bedřich Smetana, especially his opera The Bartered Bride, to worldwide attention. The National Theatre staged a cycle of all Smetana's operas with high attendance as the repertoire appealed to the local audience as well as a number of foreign guests, so the Viennese success had a very positive impact on the attendance of the theater as well.

== Šubert and artists ==
Šubert was very authoritative in managing the actors. Many of him didn't respect him. Some of them detested him, and over time there was a number of actors who were forced to leave the National Theatre in the shadow of a scandal (Marie Bittnerová, Maria Pospischil, Antonín Pulda and others. Šubert was either unable to recognize talent, or ostentatiously avoided it. When he had to, he treated talent arrogantly. He also was vindictive. He shamed director Antonín Pulda, once his opinion opponent and early-days competition, even after Pulda's death in 1894 and didn't let Maria Pospischil return to the National Theatre in 1895 for however unclear, still personal reasons.

The director certainly did not create suitable conditions for the development of artistic personalities. The two greatest artists of his time, Hana Kvapilová and Eduard Vojan repeatedly begged him, often in vain, for roles that they believed would advance them artistically. It also remains to be pondered whether they were really the greatest personalities of the Czech theatre, or the greatest personalities who did not let the milieu of the National Theatre, and the director, drive them abroad.

Young Emmy Destinn had her first humiliating theatre experience with him. She performed the role of Bizet's Carmen. Šubert coldly refused her. He even told her directly that her voice wasn't good enough and that she should take icy cold showers not to get angry while singing. Šubert also refused to engage singer Karel Burian and conductor Karel Kovařovic. Actress Hana Kvapilová, the leasing artist of her generation, did not get the opportunities and financial reward she expected and sought under Šubert's manaferment. Although Šubert respected Kvapilová, "Hana was probably not his type of actress. She did not have the external splendor that he required. His idea of acting was also more academic, of an older style."

Šubert, who demanded obedience but was subject to his libido, was unable to establish long term stability, and the female part of the ensemble went through a continuous crisis with numerous scandals and dramatic departures. (In 1889, six years after the opening, i.e. at the time of Kvapilová's engagement, there was only one outstanding actress from the generation of the Provisional Theatre – Otilie Sklenářová-Malá).

The opera singer Bohumil Benoni, in his memoirs, openly expressed his dislike for the director and the way he did, or rather did not develop artistic personalities of his troupe: "Šubert was against any Star-system in the National Theatre. Therefore, as soon as someone became a star in the National Theatre, they had to either go abroad or voluntarily compromise their demands. The system mainly consisted of not allowing the artist's ego to grow too high. Therefore, once someone excelled in a great role, they could be sure that they would immediately be removed to some secondary role or cast against their type."

== The Pospíšilová Affair ==
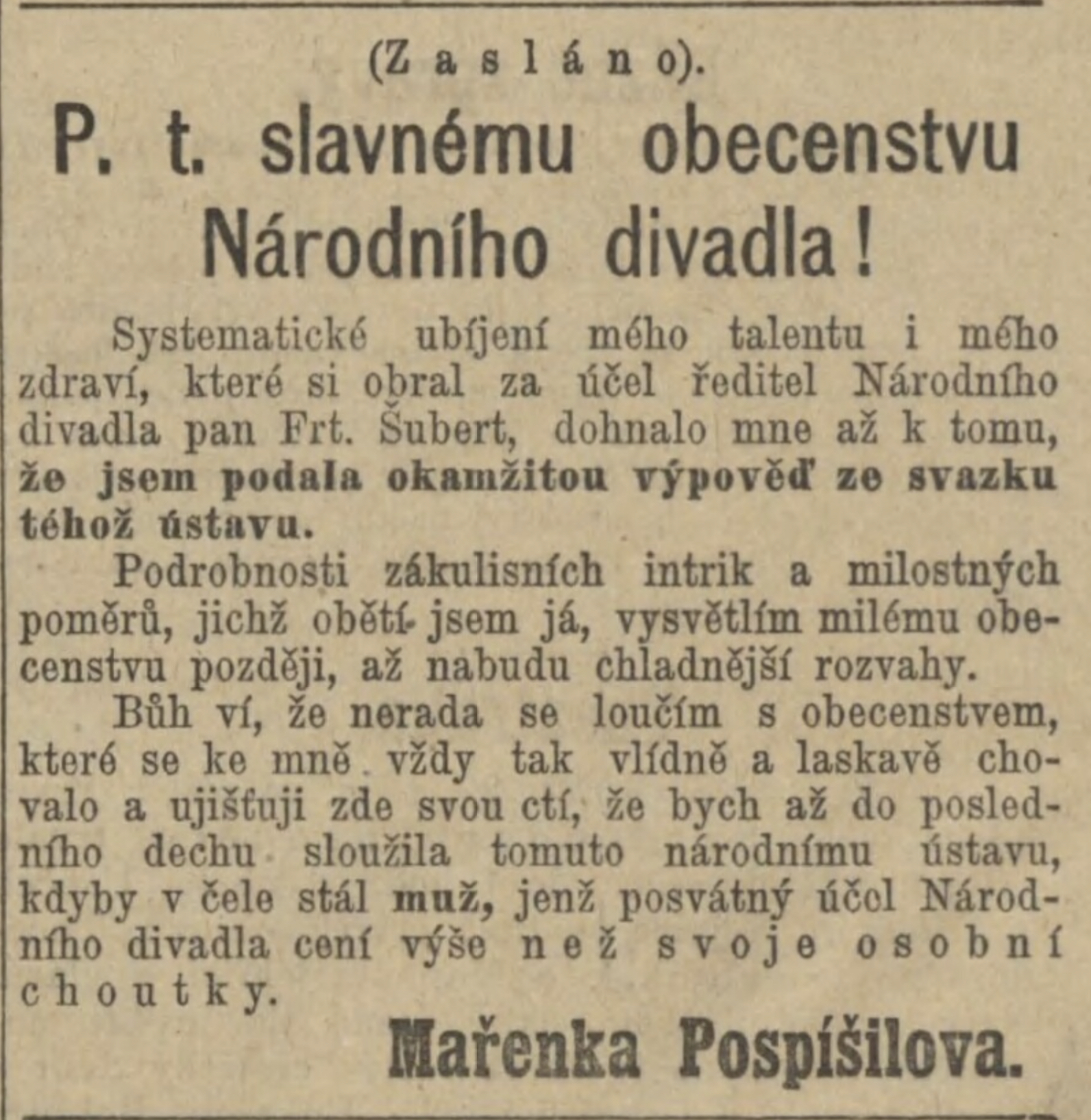
Maria Pospischil's announcement about director Šubert's love affairs in Národní listy 30 Dec 1884

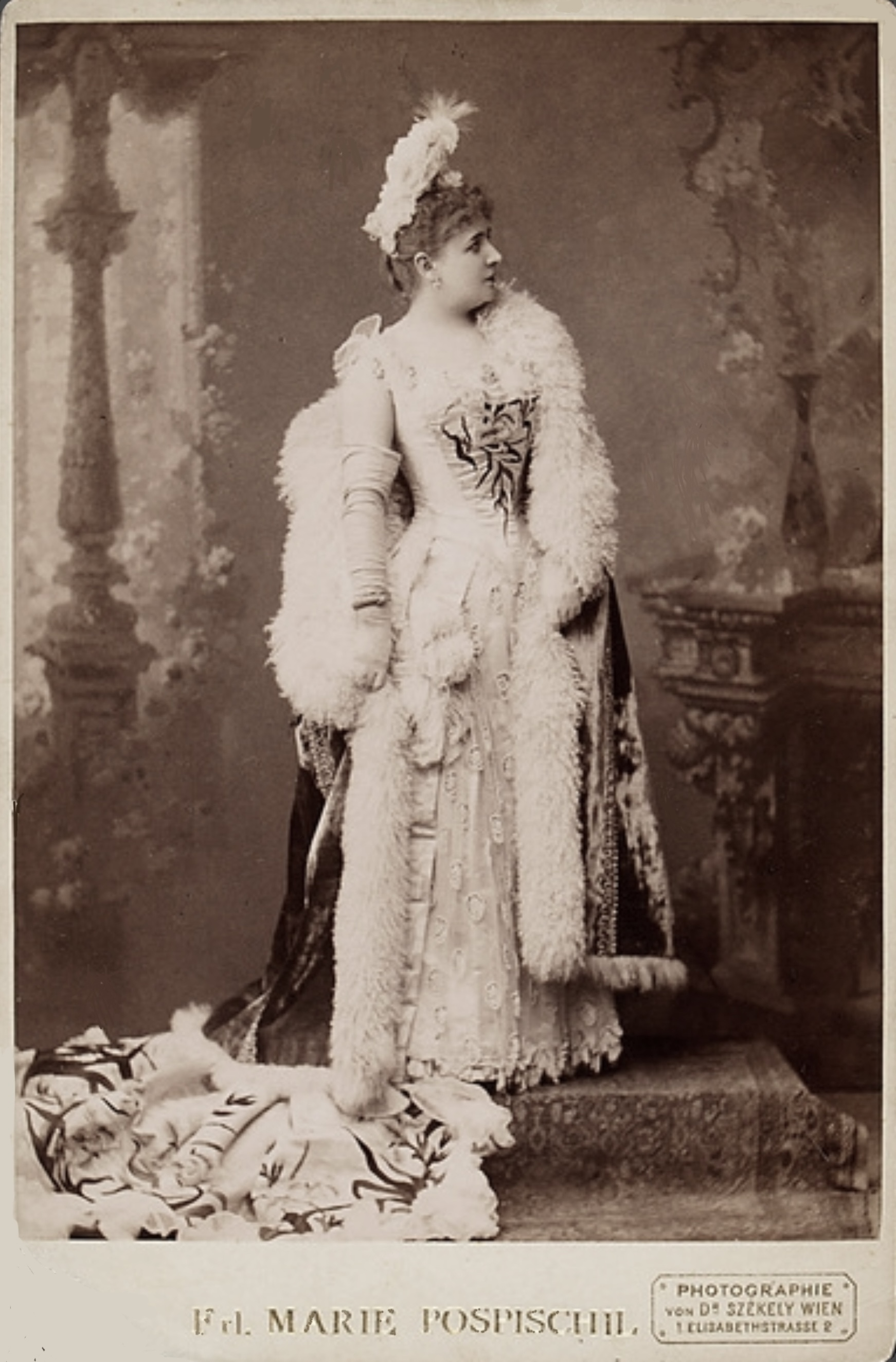
Maria Pospischil as Victorien Sardou's Fedora

One of the big controversies was Šubert's hatred of actress Maria Pospischil (Pospíšilová in Czech spelling), one of the greatest Czech dramatic talents of the end of the 19th century. In the winter of 1884, after fierce disputes with Pospischil refused to submit to the director any longer and published her critical opinion on conditions at the theatre: "The systematic killing of my talent and my health by the director of the National Theatre, Mr. František Šubert, pushed me to resign immediately. I will explain the details of the behind-the-scenes intrigues and love affairs of which I am the victim to my beloved audience later, when I am of a cooler mind. God knows I hate to say goodbye to an audience that has always treated me so kindly and dearly, and I assure here on my honor that I would serve this national institution until my last breath if it were led by a man who values the sacred purpose of the National Theatre more highly than his appetites" This quote was both published in newspapers and handed out in the National Theatre on the day of Marie Bittnerová's performance. Pospischil was the first and only one to speak publicly about Šubert's sexual relationships with actresses. Both, she and Pulda, were dismissed. They tried to reconcile with Šubert, but in vain. Šubert did not accept their apology and he never forgave Pospischil for this insult. A number of Czech politicians tried to soften the director's harshness and lobbied for Pospischil, but in vain as well. Pospischil, although later she was repeatedly asked about the reasons for her actions and choice of words, never commented on this topic.

In the spring of 1895, after 11 years of successful in Austria and Germany, starring twice in London, Maria Pospischil attempted to return to the National Theatre. She was invited to Prague by the board of trustees of the National Theatre, against Šubert's will. The ability to cooperate was very very low between the director and the board. Šubert repeatedly expressed his disapproval of her return. He often declared, "It's her or me!" It is assumed that the board of trustees were using Pospischil to test the authoritative director and only were using her to test the limits of Šubert's power and ability for compromise.

Šubert, in his strong aversion to Pospischil, repeatedly refused to reconcile with her. He outraged the newspapers and the public against her. During the month she was performing, he went to Italy for a vacation to avoid her.

Believing that her failure on stage would mean her leaving, he was behind organizing a public protest at her first performance at the National Theatre. When she appeared in front of the public on stage, hundred hired protesters rioted against her in the auditorium for eleven minutes. They shouted and whistled to prevent the actress from performing.

Later, after she succeeded after all, he proved to be stubbornly inaccessible to reconciliation. In their only face-to-face meeting (for the first time after eleven years) he was the at-best passive-aggressive and insulted Pospischil went abroad permanently. To this day, there is controversy about what happened between them on the meeting.

== Private life and casting couch controversy ==
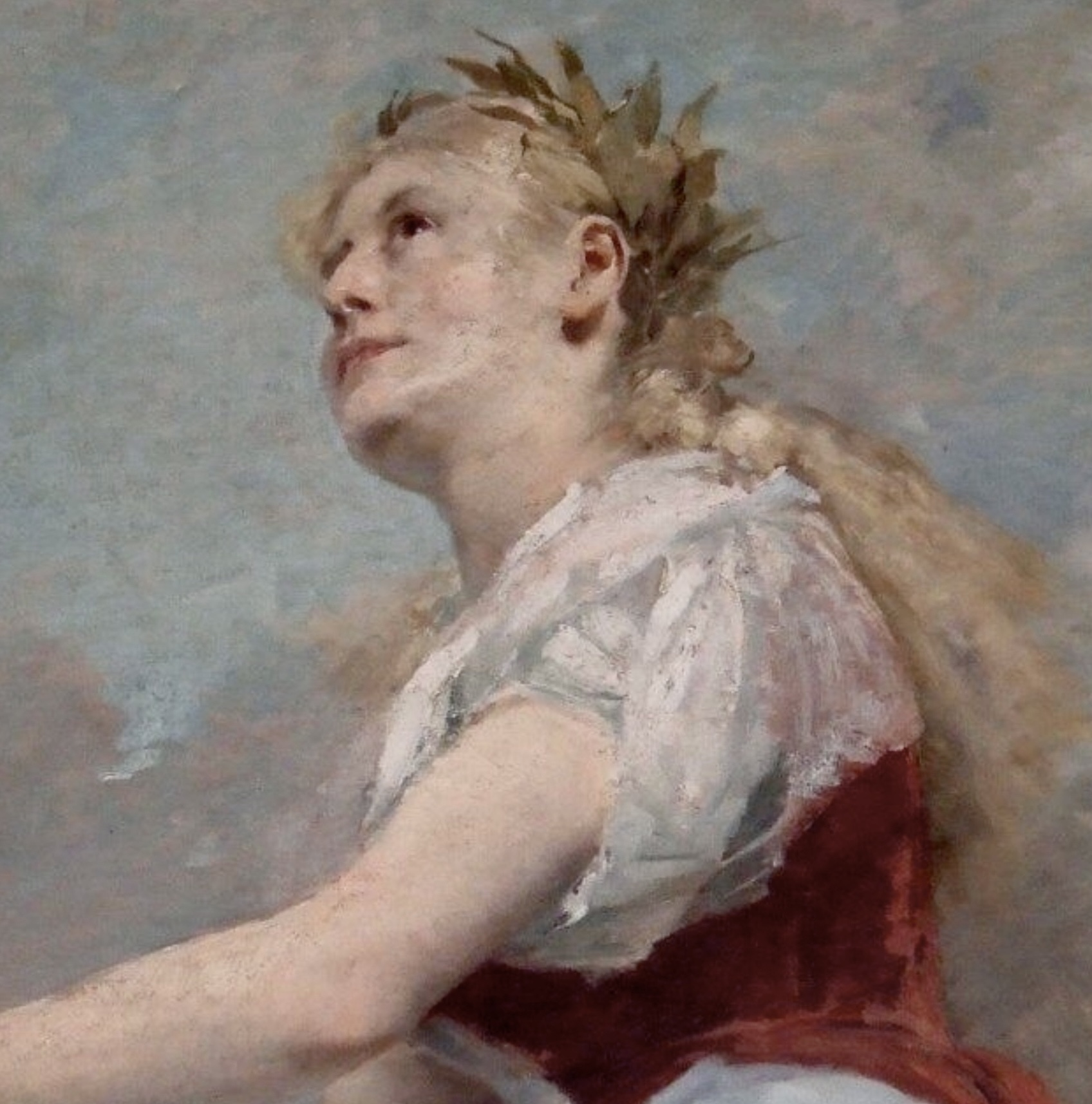
Actress Berta Formanová, another of František Šubert's lovers, was the model for Vojtěch Hynais' Saint Cecilia, a painting which is part of the interior of the National Theatre director's office

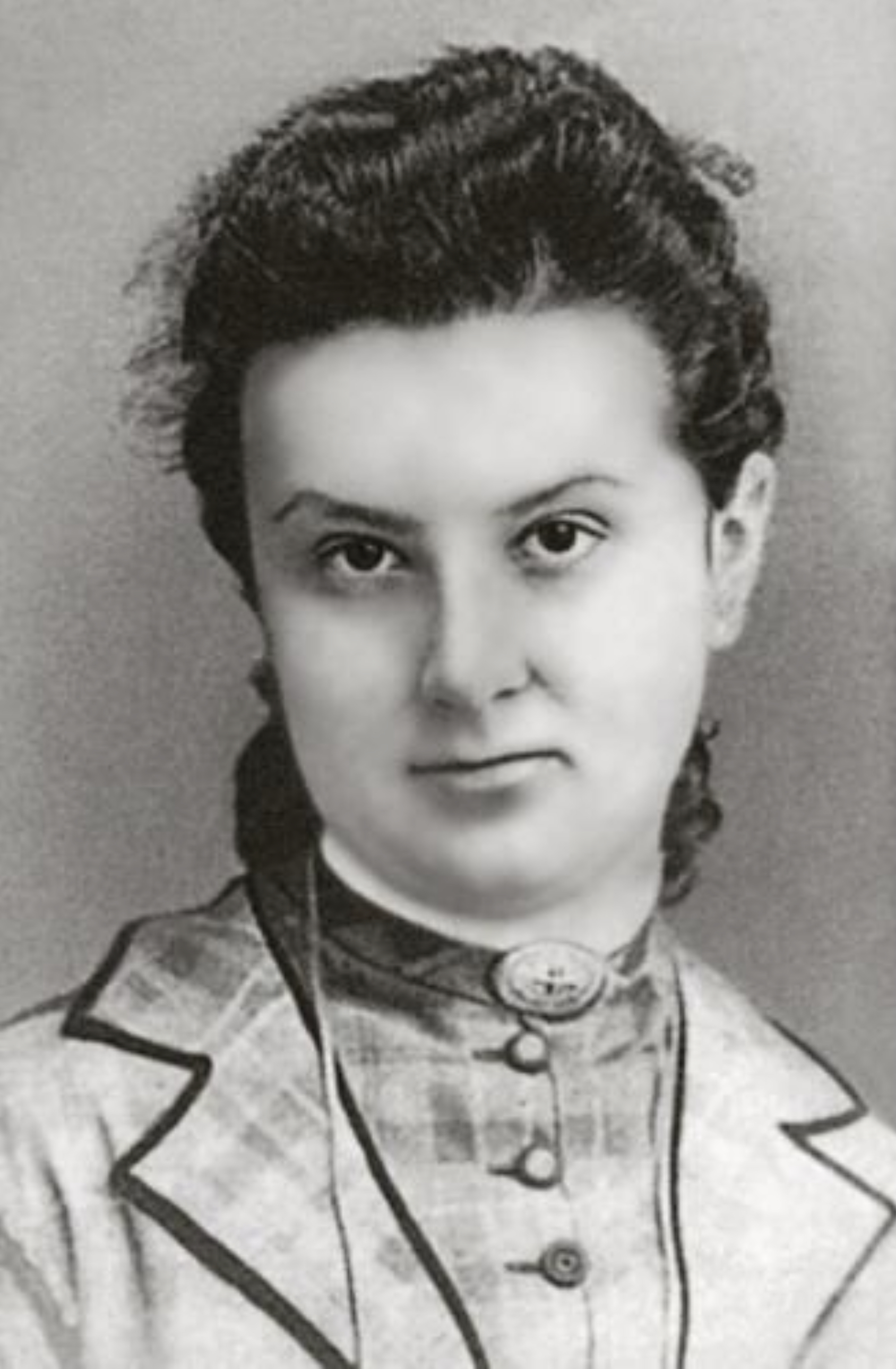
Šubert's close friend Anna Lauermannová Mikšová

Šubert remained unmarried throughout his life. His mother took care of his household, and after her death, his sister Anna and then Marie.

He proposed to the daughter of František Ladislav Rieger Libuše. It can certainly be understood as pragmatism with which he wanted to rise higher socially. Neither Rieger nor his wife agreed, however. They didn't want to give their daughter Libuše to a man of ill repute. He considered proposing to the daughter of a rich Prague landowner and owner of horse stables, Božena Špačková. He had a mutual love affair with a writer Gabriela Preissová who was already married at the time. He also pushed for her dramas to be staged at the National Theatre.

From the beginning of his career, Šubert maintained love affairs with a number of actresses and dancers from the National Theatre ensemble in exchange for part and salary increases. Some of these relationships were mutual and voluntary, some were forced and coerced. His lovers included, for example, actresses Hana Benoniová, Marie Laudová and Karla Velsová or opera singers Anna Adamcová and Irma Reichová. He was very generous to his former lovers. For example, he arranged a marriage with the painter Viktor Oliva for Adamcová, however short-lived the marriage was. Actress Velsová did not achieve a significant position in the troupe and ended her theatrical career in 1897 due to dissatisfaction with the assigned roles, low salary and acting uncertainty.

He treated his former lovers very generously. But he had a different attitude towards actresses as Hana Kvapilová, and Maria Pospischil. He, for example, arranged a marriage of Adamcová with painter Viktor Oliva. Šubert especially predated on young women and to his spiritual friend and confessor Anna Lauermannová-Mikschová he confided: "A virgin must be coerced by being mesmerized” / alt. “You must whisper sweet nothings into the ears of virgins”. (“Pannu musíte zvyklat.” )" Lauermann called him Don Juan and “erotic”. In the same time, she took him for a decent respectable gentleman. She claimed that women were seducing him, that he, though in a position of power, was controlled by them.

Lauermannová as well used to be a victim of sexual abuse and domestic violence herself from her unstable psychotic ex-husband and didn't show any understanding for the women. She noted his words without drawing any conclusions about Šubert's personality. She didn't have much respect for actresses in general. This also shows Victorian standards of morality and sexuality, both accepted and acceptable at that time, and a high level of tolerance to sexual harassment towards women that made this working environment at the National Theatre possible.

In two known cases, he damaged careers of actresses who did not want to submit to his sexual advances (only the name of one is known, Běla Horská. His sexual demands were probably also one of the causes of the antipathy between him and the actress Maria Pospischil.

Casting couch practices of theatre directors were not uncommon in late 19th century Central Europe. For example, a German fictional autobiography called Aus dem Tagebuche einer deutschen Schauspielerin published in 1912 reveals many sinister conventions of those days. Prague society knew about the director's obsession with actresses, and for a number of important personalities, such as Josef Hlávka, he was persona non grata.

This side of Šubert's personality is more or less unknown today, because in his time it was not possible to publicly report on such a man's behavior. To this day, it is revealed mainly thanks to private diary entries, e.g. Anna Lauermannová-Mikschová or another daughter of F. L. Rieger, Marie Červinková-Riegerová.

Some archive sources show the double standards of society, for example Bronislava Herbenová, the wife of journalist Jan Herben, was close friends with Šubert, but she considered his lovers, actresses Hana Benoniová and Maria Laudová, to be harlots. Šubert's behaviour seems to be seen as unmanly, as a weakness of a man who cannot control his passions and drives, which are a natural and immanent part of manliness, but thereby he himself appears weak. The perception of targets of his sexual predation were never taken into account.

He proposed at least twice to the divorced writer and socialite Anna Lauermannová-Mikschová. However, she also repeatedly rejected him, even though she maintained a lifelong friendship with him. Šubert also confided in her about his erotic advances. Šubert's love for Lauermannová-Mikschová may have been sincere, but she feared his insatiable sexuality and at the same time she enjoyed the power she had over him: ”Perhaps – perhaps – perhaps Gabriela Preissová is right with her somewhat crude interpretation: "He got them all, but because he didn't get her, he loves me."

Lauermannová, who herself was socially unacceptable due to her divorce, sympathized with Šubert and pitied him for society's critique and condemnation. Anna Lauermannová-Mikschová considered marrying Šubert, she knew about his intimate relationships with actresses, but Maria Pospischil was a woman of ill repute for her (even though Pospischil was not Šubert's mistress).

== Final years in the National Theatre ==
Pospischil's return to Germany turned many influential opinion makers Šubert and there was a strong antipathy against him. Although he was probably the least popular in his position during this period, the National Theatre went in probably the most progressive direction.

The premiere was Jaroslav Hilbert's Guilt (Vina) in 1896 with excellent Hana Kvapilová and Eduard Vojan in the lead roles. Another memorable premiere was Julius Zeyer's romantic drama Radúz and Mahulena in 1898, a Slovak fairy tale that has survived to this day rather only thanks to Josef Suk's music. Jaroslav Kvapil's Princess Dandelion (Princezna Pampeliška) and Alois Jirásek's Emigrant (an inventive look at Habsburg oppression, the main character – an antagonistic Protestant in a post-Catholic village) also opened. These dramas did not prove to be timeless, but at their time they were at the top of Czech dramatic production.

Quality foreign repertoire also began to be performed – Gerhart Hauptmann's Lonely Lives, Henrik Ibsen's John Gabriel Borkman, and shortly before Šubert's dismissal, Arthur Schnitzler's The Green Cockatoo Der grüne Kakadu (shortly after its Viennese world opening) were performed.

== End as director ==
The voices critical of Šubert's leadership of the National Theatre, which were appearing throughout his career, became sharper from the mid-1890s. Most of Šubert's great achievements were a result of his managerial skills, not his artistic visions. Audiences and critics alike pointed to the low artistic standard, but on the other hand a fluctuating level of quality is relatively common for a repertory theatre troupe, often over several seasons. There were successful and critically acclaimed shows, as eg. the world smash hit romantic tragedy, Edmond Rostand's Cyrano de Bergerac in 1899 (produced in Prague fifteen months after its Paris premiere). Rather, Šubert did not achieve any significant and visible success, as previously in the case of theatre trains or participation in the exhibition in Vienna. And theatre professionals, tired with him, did not want to recognize any success of his.

The cooperation of the artistic and political opposition achieved changes in the management of the theatre. In 1900, Šubert's term as director ended and Gustav Schmoranz was appointed the new director. Karel Kovařovic became the head of opera and Jaroslav Kvapil the head of drama.

== Other activities ==
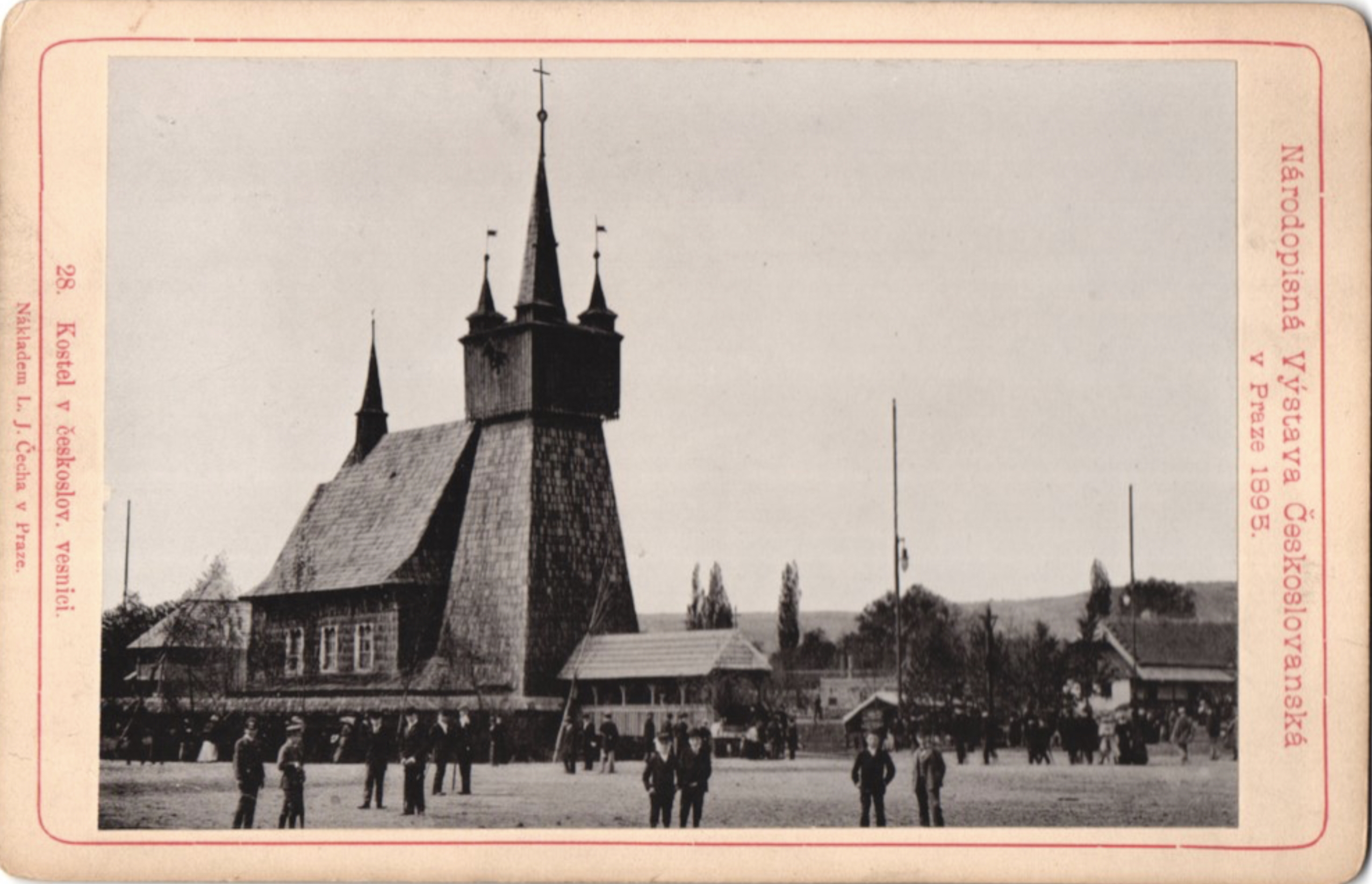
A church in the exhibition village

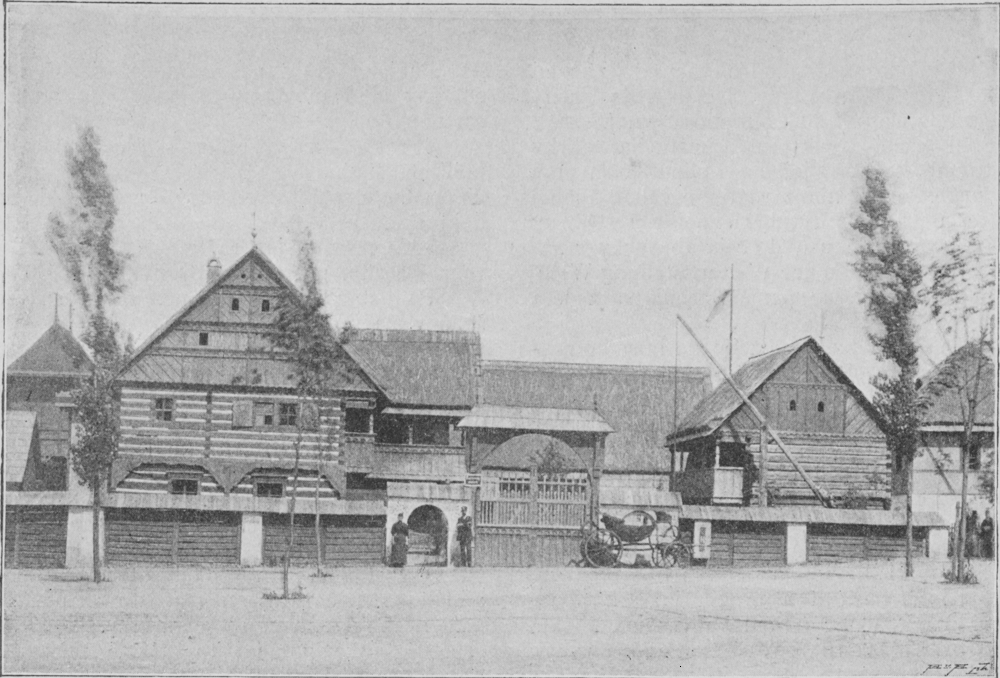
Farmhouse from the Jizera Mountains region, a part of the exhibition village

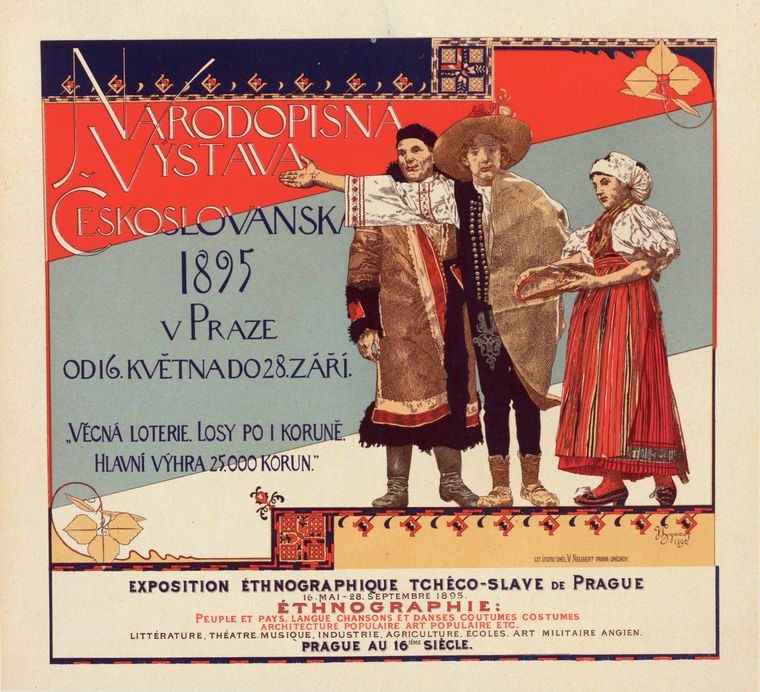
Poster of Czech-Slav Ethnographic Exhibition in Prague

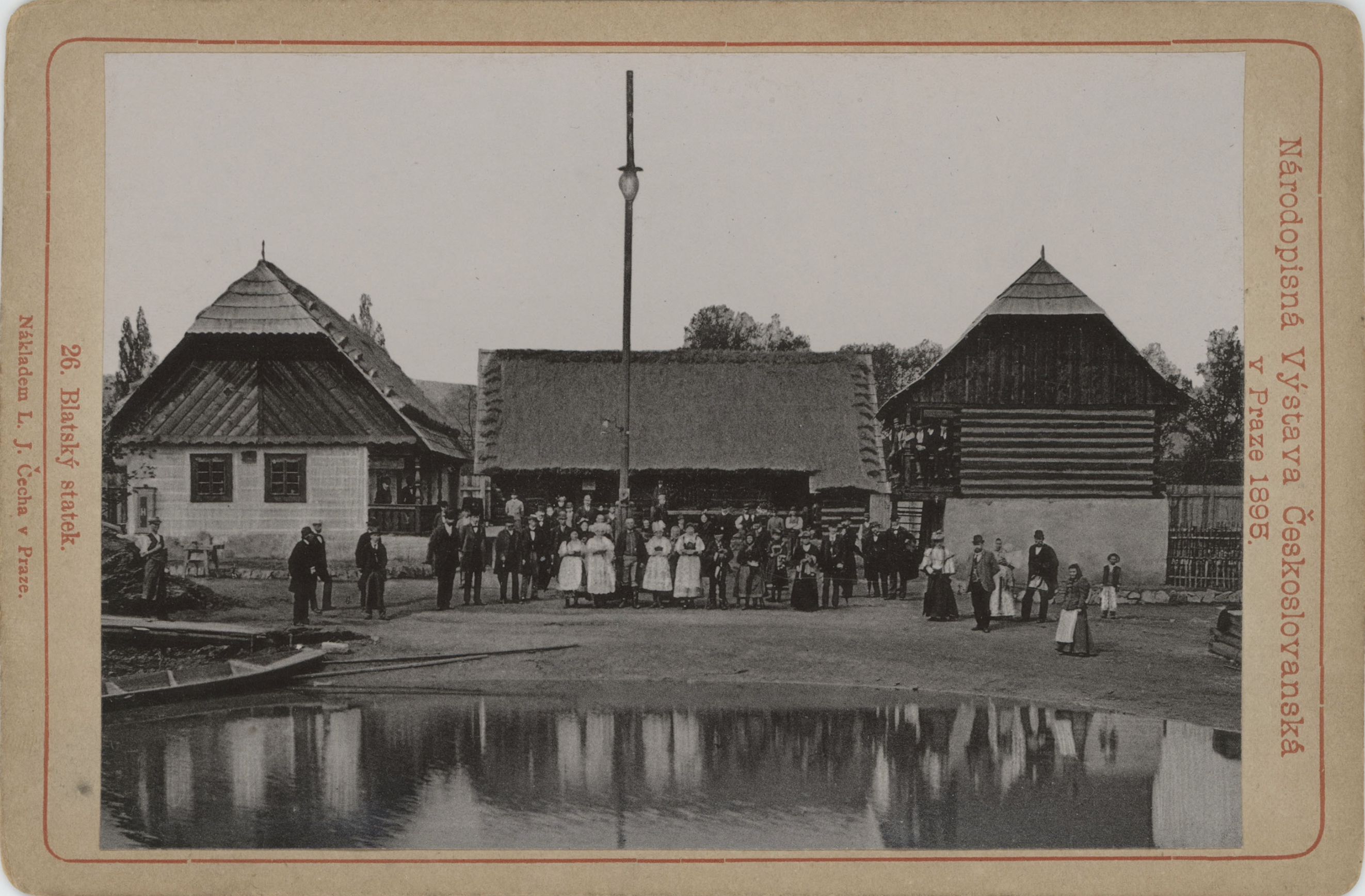
Farmhouses in the exhibition village

In 1895, Šubert initiated and organized the Czecho-Slav Ethnographic Exhibition in Prague, which laid the foundation of Czech ethnology. It was preceded by three years of preparatory work in individual regions. The exhibition presented unique folk exhibits from all over Bohemia. The highlight was the "exhibition village" with original cottages and farmhouses. Šubert published a comprehensive publication with rich photo documentation about the entire project, which still serves as a source of Czech ethnography. The project was very successful and was considered a great achievement for Šubert who at the very same time led a controversial public fight with actress Maria Pospischil.

The exhibition had a strong national-political undertone. One of the main works of art newly created for the exhibition was a large painting by Mikoláš Aleš with a historic theme of "The Slaughter of the Saxons at Hrubá Skála". The canvas was exceptional due to its acute political context and its size of 10 × 8.5 m. The image of the painting is based on the Manuscript of Dvůr Králové, the authenticity of which was strongly disputed at the time of its creation.

Šubert felt strong sympathy for the working class. While he respected the day laborers as a serious part of the nation. Starting 1893, he introduced ticket discounts for "people's performances" and even organized a "worker's performance" on 1 May 1898, in which the Social Democrats rented the entire theater and gave tickets to their members. Even in the best boxes, there were workers sitting. His deep social sentiment exceeded the tolerable limit of Czech bourgeoisie, that saw working class mainly as a cause of chaos and unrest.

Šubert was a member of the team that discussed the establishment of the second theater in Prague. He intensively promoted the establishment of the second Prague theatre as a branch of the National Theatre. However, his opponents disagreed and strongly demanded that the new theater be a competition to the National Theatre. Another reason was to give actors, who often went abroad after a rift with Šubert, other artistic employment in Prague. The main opponents of Šubert's proposal were Jaroslav Kvapil, Gustav Schmoranz and Václav Štech.

== Later career ==
After leaving the National Theatre, Šubert found it difficult to maintain a standard of living, as he was deprived mainly of income from writing and journalism. He edited the cultural-political magazine Osvěta, contributed to the Old Czech Party daily newspaper Národní politika and others. He repeatedly returned to his work at the National Theater in his writing, but he was not capable of an objective view and his conception is biased. He was also culturally active. in 1912 he co-organized the unveiling of the monument to the famous Czech poet Karel Hynek Mácha by sculptor Josef Václav Myslbek on Petřín Hill in Prague, which has become one of the iconic places of Prague.

It was also financial reasons that motivated him to take the position of director of the newly opened Vinohrady Theatre in 1907–1908. He was the first director of the venue, the second Czech theatre building in Bohemia. However, his relatively short period was not very artistically significant. His approach was seen as outdated and he soon left the function.

== Šubert as playwright ==
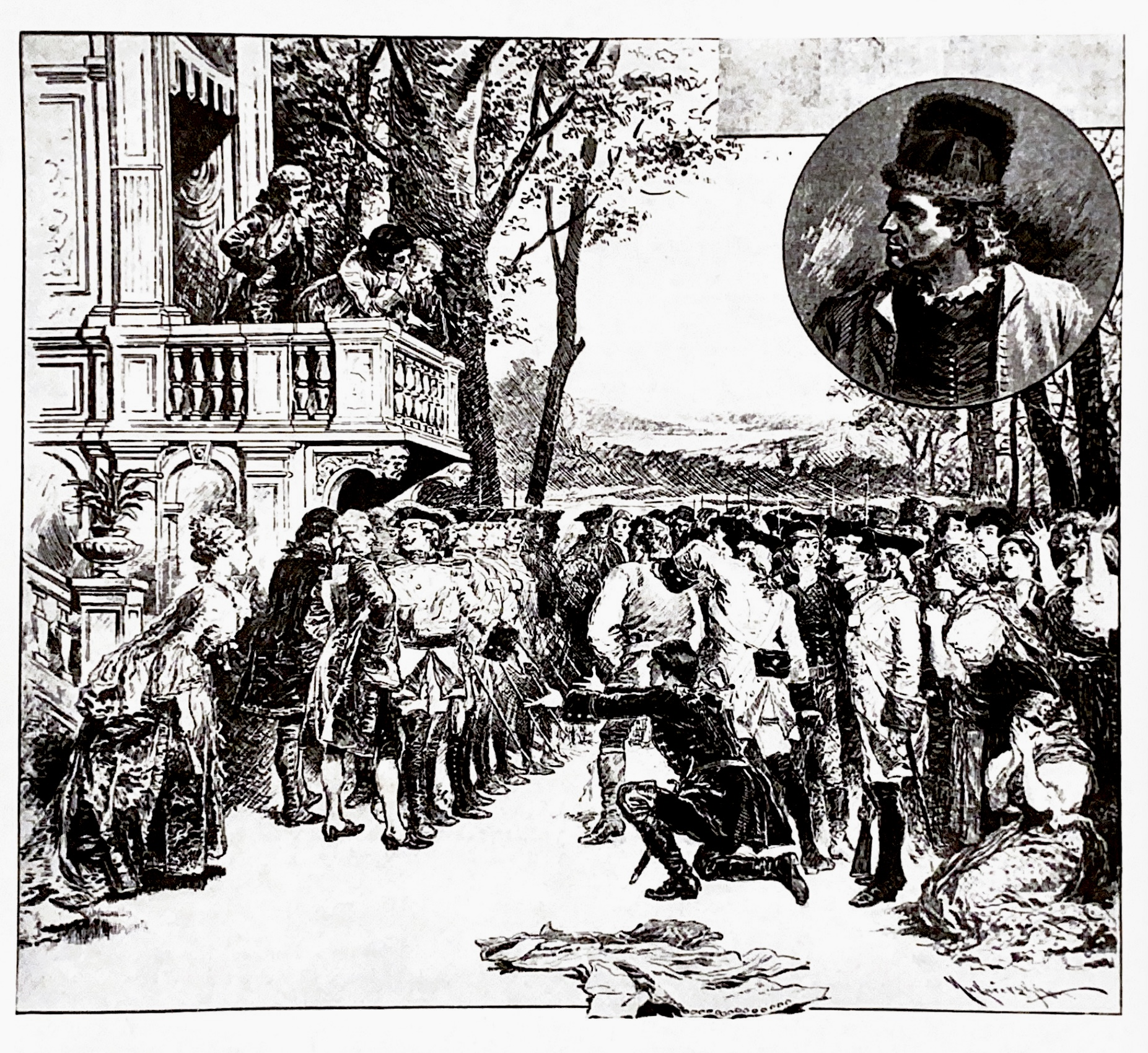
A lithograph showing a scene from Šubert's drama Jan Výrava

Šubert was also a prolific writer, especially of plays. However, none of them have remained in the Czech theatre tradition to this day. However, his plays had a significant response in his time, they were translated into German, Polish or Slovenian. Šubert mostly dealt with social themes and strived for a modern social drama.

His historical drama Jan Výrava about one of the peasant uprisings at the end of the 18th century achieved the greatest success. Šubert was particularly interesting thanks to the effective crowd scenes and the captivatingly described characters of the rebels.

His social drama The Drama of Four Poor Walls (Drama čtyř chudých stěn) depicts the death of a nationally active miner and other victims of a workers' strike clash with soldiers. The play was first banned by the censors for its social risqueness and was not first performed until ten years after it was written,

== End of life ==
Šubert died on 8 September 1915 in Prague and was buried in a grave at the Olšany Cemetery.
