= Kvapil =

Kvapil (feminine Kvapilová) is a Czech surname, it may refer to:

- Carson Kvapil, American race car driver
- Hana Kvapilová, Czech stage actress
- Jaroslav Kvapil, Czech poet
- Jaroslav Kvapil (composer), Czech composer
- Marek Kvapil, Czech ice hockey player
- Michala Kvapilová, Czech volleyball player
- Radoslav Kvapil, Czech pianist
- Travis Kvapil, American race car driver
