= Antonín Pulda =

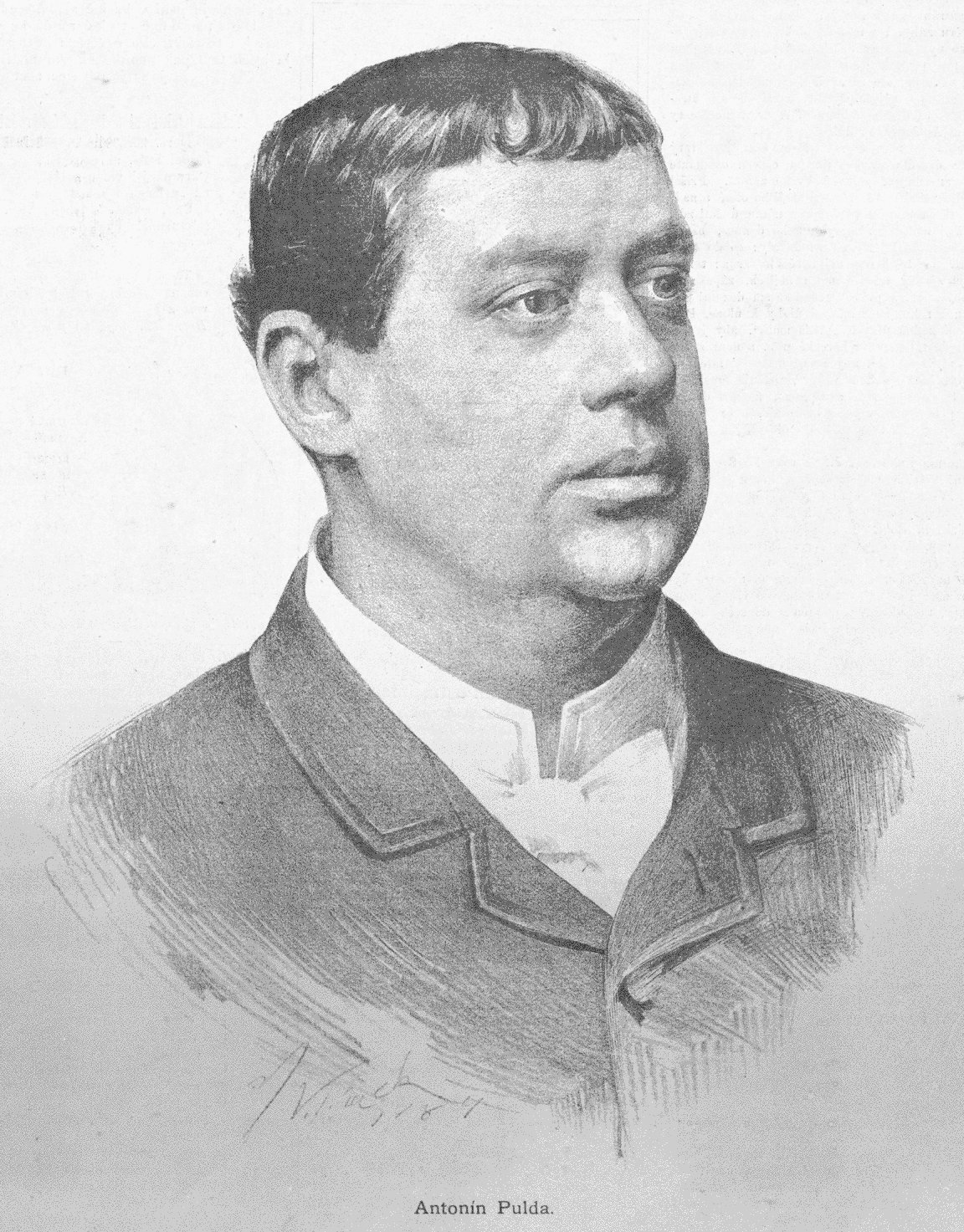
Pulda in 1884

Antonín Pulda (9 March 1848 – 3 October 1894) was a Czech actor, theatre director, translator, playwright and author of farces and operetta librettos.

== Early life ==
Born and raised in Prague, where he also attended college, he centred the majority of his life around theatre. He was self-taught in foreign languages, literature, history and art history.

== Provisional Theatre ==
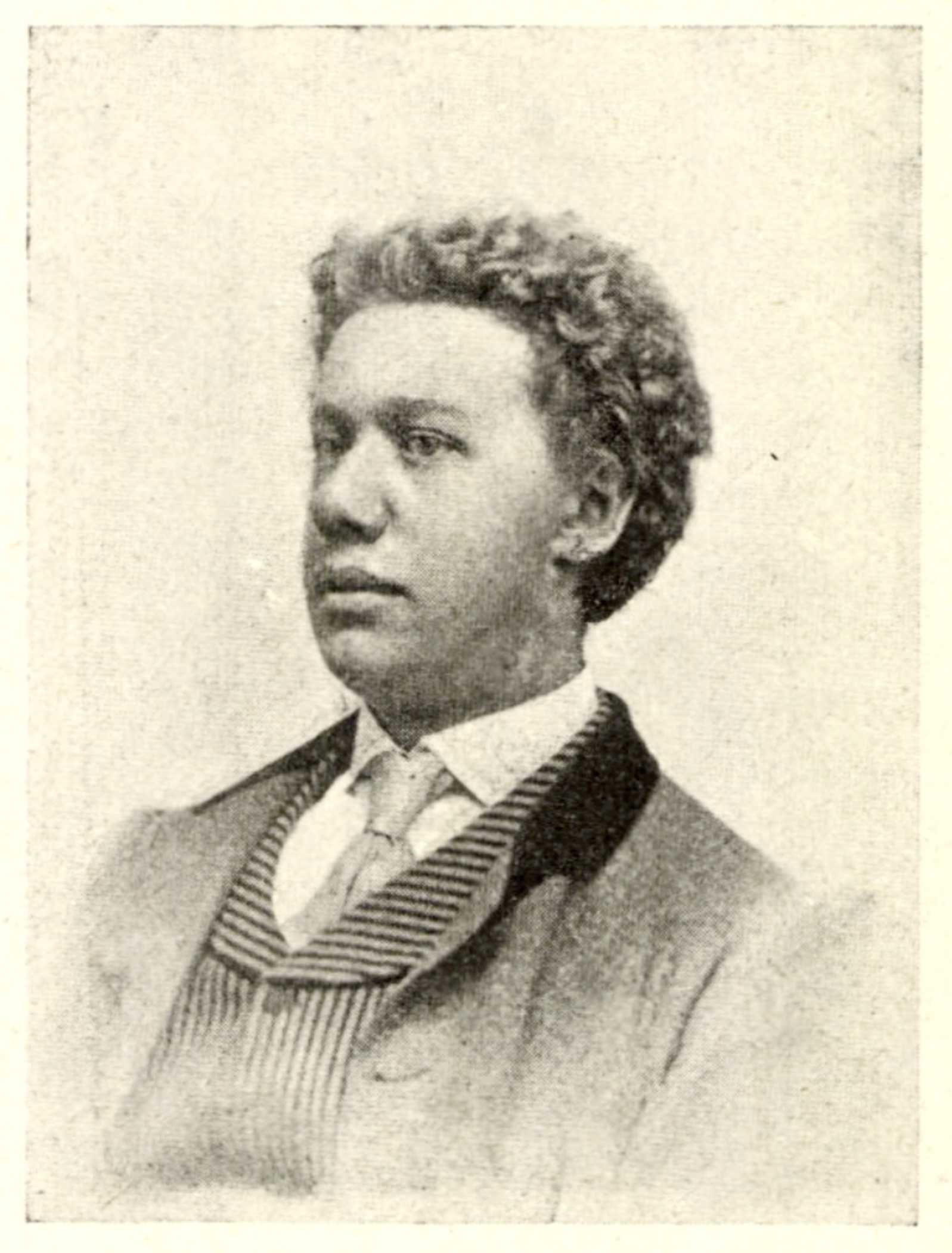
Pulda in 1880

He became one of the leading figures of the Provisional Theatre, influencing the style and repertoire. As a stage director, he was noted for his success in staging contemporary French dramas. He had a great understanding of wit of conversational dialogue and a sense for the intimacy of parlour plays.

There, he soon recognized the talent of a young actress named Maria Pospischil. Pulda, a very intelligent and experienced teacher, brought out the performing skills of Pospischil in surprising depths. The first role he coated her in was the role of Louisa in Friedrich Schiller's drama Intrigue and Love and she rose to become one of the leading actresses of the Provisional Theatre. Pulda continued guiding her artistically for many years, they became lovers and eventually partners He worked with her on most of her parts at the beginning of her career, both in Czech and German.

== National Theatre ==
After the transformation into the National Theatre and the installation of a new director, František Šubert, he lost his influence. He was neither close in opinion to Šubert, nor did he get along with the dramaturge Ladislav Stroupežnický.

He was ambitious and aspired to become the National Theatre director.

In 1894, on Stroupežnický's instructions, director Šubert did not assign Pulda the direction of the highly expected new French melodrama, Ohnet's The Ironmaster, but gave the task to director Jakub Seifert. Šubert also assigned the role of Claire, the female lead, to Marie Bittnerová, who got on well with Šubert, and the supporting role of Athenaida to Maria Pospischil, Pulda's lover and Bittnerová's competition. Her recent considerable success in the role of Queen Elizabeth of Pomerania in the comedy A Night at Karlštejn attracted the attention of many directors.

Subsequently, dramaturge Stroupežnický attacked Pulda during a rehearsal for Hugo's drama Marion de Lorme with Pospichil in the title role. Stroupežnický began to demand new changes of the text, which Pulda felt was an attack aimed at his interpretation of the play. He was replaced by Seifert in the position of the director.

Shortly afterwards, he was accused of initiating a public rebellion of actress Maria Pospischil against the director. Before the premiere of The Ironmaster in December 1884, Pospischil had a fierce fight with Šubert in his office and afterwards published her critical opinion on the conditions at the theatre: "The systematic killing of my talent and my health by the director of the National Theatre, Mr. František Šubert, pushed me to resign immediately. I will explain the details of the behind-the-scenes intrigues and love affairs of which I am the victim to my beloved audience later, when I am of a cooler mind," hinting on Šubert's love affairs as he was famous for having sexual relationships with actresses. This quote was both published in newspapers and handed out in the National Theatre on the day of Marie Bittnerová's performance. Both she and Pulda were dismissed. They tried to reconcile with Šubert, but in vain. Šubert did not accept their apology. Both, Pulda and Pospischil were fired. They tried to reconcile with the theatre management and publicly apologized, but Šubert refused to accept their apology. Pospischil, although later she was repeatedly asked about the reasons for her actions and choice of words, never commented on this topic.

Later, director Šubert repeatedly called Pulda "unnecessary" or "average", which caused controversy and seemed inappropriate among theatre insiders, especially after Pulda's death in 1894.

== Later life ==
He thought of setting up another theatre in Prague for himself and his protégé Pospischil (the only Czech theatre in Prague being the National Theatre at that time), but he wasn't able to follow through.

He went with Pospischil to Berlin and later to Vienna. He tried to break through as an actor, but despite his excellent knowledge of German, his ambitions came to naught. He remained with Pospischil, accompanying her on German stages as her impresario and secretary.

Without a stable engagement, he suffered from existential uncertainty and his family lived in poverty. Pospischil supported them.

In the last phase of his life, he was being treated North Italian spas due to having suffered from tuberculosis. Pospischil supported him financially. He died suddenly of a severe stroke in 1894 at his wife's home in Prague.

== Other activities ==
Pulda translated over a hundred plays into Czech. He is the author of several theatre texts of his own.

In 1876–1877 he worked on the libretto for the musical comedy Indian Princess based on the comedy Die Prinzessin von Calambo by August von Kotzebue. The music was composed by Karel Bendl. Indian Princess is considered the first original Czech operetta. In 1907, Pulda's libretto was replaced by a new one by Karel Mašek. The construction of the original libretto seemed weak, the situations vague, and the verse and prose flimsy. The humor was strongly rooted at the time of its creation and 30 years later it was worn out. However, the new libretto was not received positively.

== Private life ==
He met his future wife, actress Marie Šímová in 1863 in a little Prague theatre called "U Zlatého anděla", producing the tragedy Magelóna by Josef Jiří Kolár where she played the leading female role. He had three children with his wife Marie. His son Jaroslav and daughter Augusta also became actors, however his son Vratislav died prematurely.

He maintained a friendly relationship with the actress Maria Pospischil, his former theatre pupil. After they both left the National Theatre, Pulda left his wife and children and toured Poland with Pospischil and later lived with her in Berlin and Vienna. They were rumoured to have had a love affair, which is probable as they lived together for nearly a decade. He returned to Prague in late 1894 and died soon after his homecoming.
