= Hana Kvapilová =

Czech actress

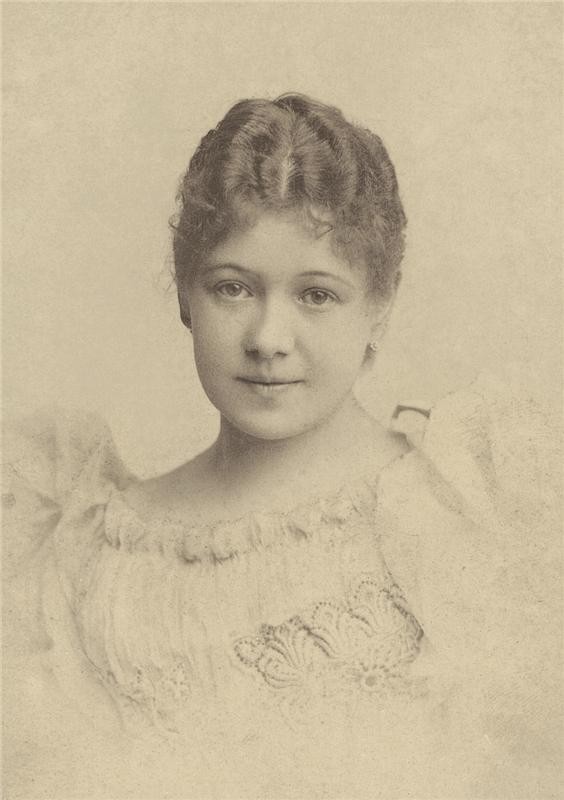
Hana Kvapilová

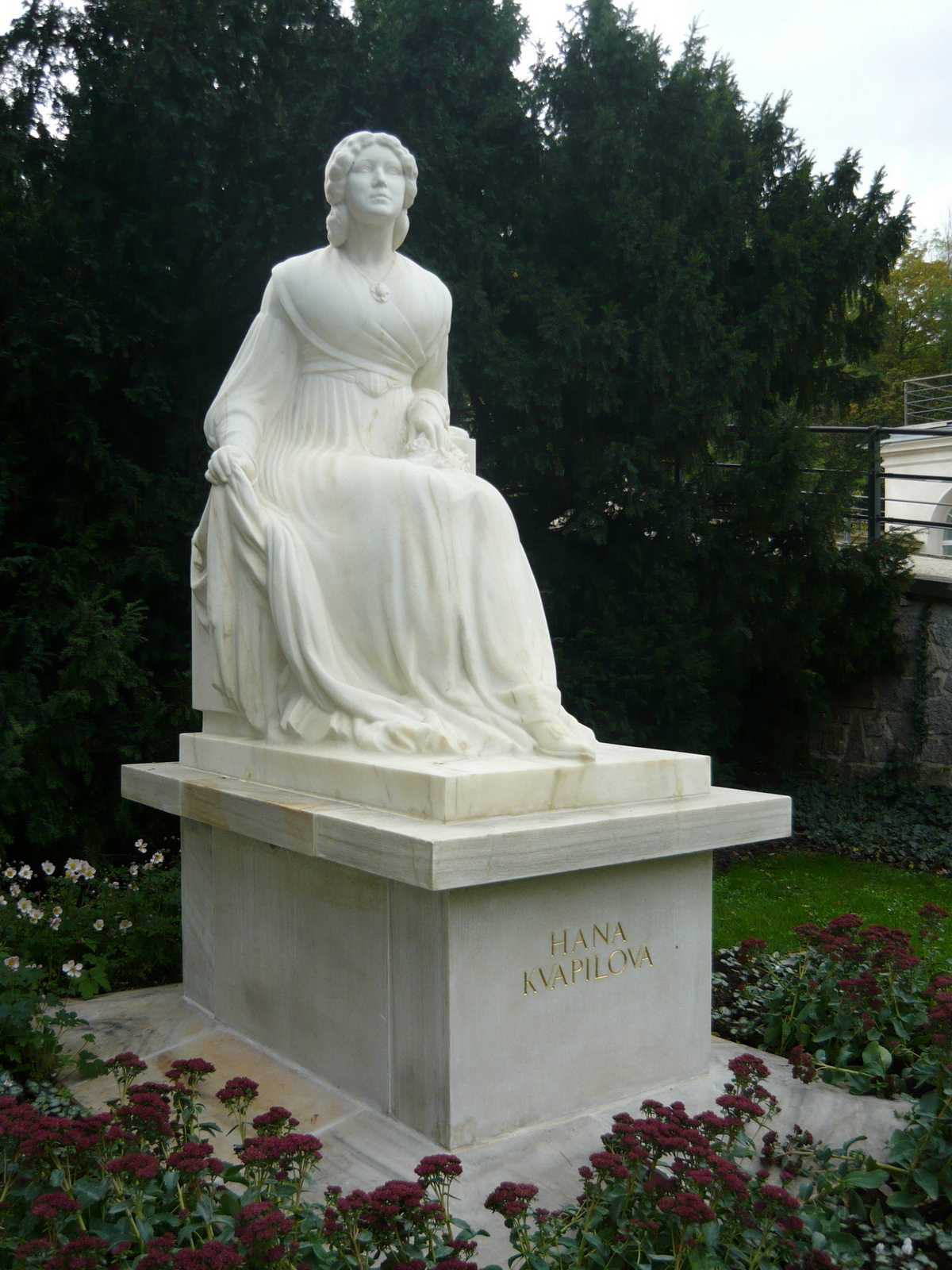
Hana Kvapilová monument

Hana Kvapilová (29 November 1860 – 8 April 1907) was a Czech actress.

== Early life ==
Johanna Kubesch (Hana Kubešová) was born in Prague, the daughter of Gustav Kubeš.

Her father ran an established gilding workshop. Later he wanted to get rich in land speculation but failed and lost almost all the family money. Her mother, strongly religious, was raised in a parsonage. She was probably the priest's daughter.

She studied at a girls' high school in Prague but she found little interest in studying and her school performance was average. She was interested in theatre from a young age. Her piano teacher was Antonín Dvořák. After her father's bankruptcy, she lived in considerable material poverty.

Her father was an amateur actor and painted sets for amateur theater groups. He performed occasionally as a comedian.

== Career ==
Kubešová joined the National Theatre in 1889 as an actress of the second rank. In her previous engagement, she played Nora Helmer (she was the first Czech actress to perform this role), Ophelia and Gretchen. Her previous theater experience was not taken into account. The theatre management preferred director Šubert's mistresses, Hana Benoniová and Maria Laudová. Later she got into the character type of naive lovers and sentimental roles.

Her greatest successes were the role of Mína Mařáková in the drama Guilt (Vina in Czech) by Jaroslav Hilbert in 1896. Hilbert wrote the role directly for Kvapilová, and this character of a touching, abandoned, poor, girl despised by her mother won her the sympathy of the audience. Kvapilová's Mína, seduced and afraid of revealing her guilt, showed most of her motivations by indirect actions revealing subtext rather than open emotions. Here, Kvapilová was able to show for the first time her concept of acting focused on the detail of a banal action.

In 1897, she created her most famous role, the titular Princess Dandelion (Princezna Pampeliška in Czech) in a fairy tale by her husband Jaroslav Kvapil. Again, this is a fragile girl who is struggling to survive in a harsh world.

Kvapilová created a strong, exciting and attractive archetype of a simple woman widely embraced by Czech society, introverted and submissive, but defiant and internally unbroken, who became a popular concept of a woman at the end of the 19th century. Other actresses of the troupe who also portrayed characters of this type (Marie Bittnerová in Jenůfa and Hana Benoniová Maryša) didn't embrace those roles as a core part in their repertoire (Bittnerová preferred the classical Shakespearean repertoire and Benoniová contemporary Well-made play French salon roles – both of which did not attract the interest of a wider audience).

Kvapilová did not get the opportunities she expected and sought under Šubert's era. She begged the management for a role by Ibsen in vain. Šubert, after previous unfavorable experiences, was afraid that an Ibsen production would be a commercial failure. In his publications, he highly praised Kvapilová (especially to emphasize that the theater did not need Maria Pospischil, whom he had driven out of the troupe), but in practice he did not give Kvapilová any significant acting opportunities.

When the National Theatre management chose Ibsen's John Gabriel Borkman in 1897, Laudová was cast in the role of Fanny Wilton, and only when she gave up the role, Kvapilová got to play the part. (The play was performed only twice, so Kvapilová played it only once and it was her first of two Ibsen roles before her husband took up the position of dramaturg). The second Ibsen opportunity was Rebecca West in Rosmersholm (she was featured four times).

== After 1900 ==
After 1900, when her husband was appointed dramaturg of the National Theatre, Kvapilová became the target of spiteful campaigns in the media, (before 1900 she was often referred to as the top of the National Theater actresses). Journalists accused her of using her husband's influence on her choice of roles and repertoire (she was referred to as the "director of the National Theatre"). Kvapilová played fewer roles, but in a more judicious selection. Her acting potential could thus find better opportunities than in Šubert's era, when she received significant opportunities only thanks to the intercession of Czech playwrights.

In the fall of 1901, she was condemned as being preferred and previous management favourite Hana Benoniová and Maria Laudová were intentionally damaged. Václav Štech, a strong critic of the National Theatre belonged to these critics (he was one of the strongest critics of Šubert's management as well).

In 1903, dramatist Jaroslav Hilbert attacked Kvapilová in the magazine Moderní Revue. His first big success was the play Guilt performed at the National Theatre in 1896 with Hana Kvapilová in the lead role.

Hilbert's spite was based on personal motives. Kvapilová turned down the role of Queen Kunhuta in his upcoming play Falkenstein due to her poor health, although she simultaneously she appeared in guest starred in regional theatres, and Hilbert felt affected by this. Hilbert also criticized the management of the theatre, which, according to him, doomed the play to failure with the audience already by staging it in the summer season and only four rehearsals were held before the premiere.

In Modern Revue, Hilbert coined a controversial thesis that a middle-class actress "collaborator" mastering a modern acting style could not impress on stage in the same way as the great heroines of the previous generation could, leading the lifestyle of courtesans. He blamed her of artistic lie as according to him, she didn't represent realistic expression of life, but another artistic stylization that was duller than the previous one, and more false because it claimed to be the truth. "She made us sympathize with every character she played. It couldn't have happened that we wouldn't have found a terribly good woman, who she represented on stage... She created such a number of poetic beings – genderless – longing for the distance that Mr. Mucha could envy her that sweet stuff."

Kvapilová was not able to face these attacks and became introvert.

In this period, she played "Nora Helmer" in Ibsen's A Doll's House; and the lead in Hedda Gabler, "Masha" in Chekhov's Three Sisters, and "Helen" in her husband's The Will o' the Wisp. She was a friend and colleague to Czech composer Leoš Janáček, and Czech writer Alois Jirásek, among many others.

She was awarded the Order of St. Sava for her stage work in Belgrade in 1902, and was compared to Italian actress Eleonora Duse: "Her grasp of character and range of expression were such as to have earned her the title of the Czech Duse."

== Personal life ==
Kubešová was dating her fellow actor Eduard Vojan. Later she married writer and director Jaroslav Kvapil in 1894. She died in 1907, from complications related to diabetes; she had performed five days earlier, in Shakespeare's Much Ado About Nothing. She was 46 years old. After her death, Jaroslav Kvapil published her memoirs. Her ashes were buried in a park in Prague, and the site was marked with a statue of Kvapilová by Jan Štursa. She was featured on a Czech postage stamp in 1960.

== Acting style ==
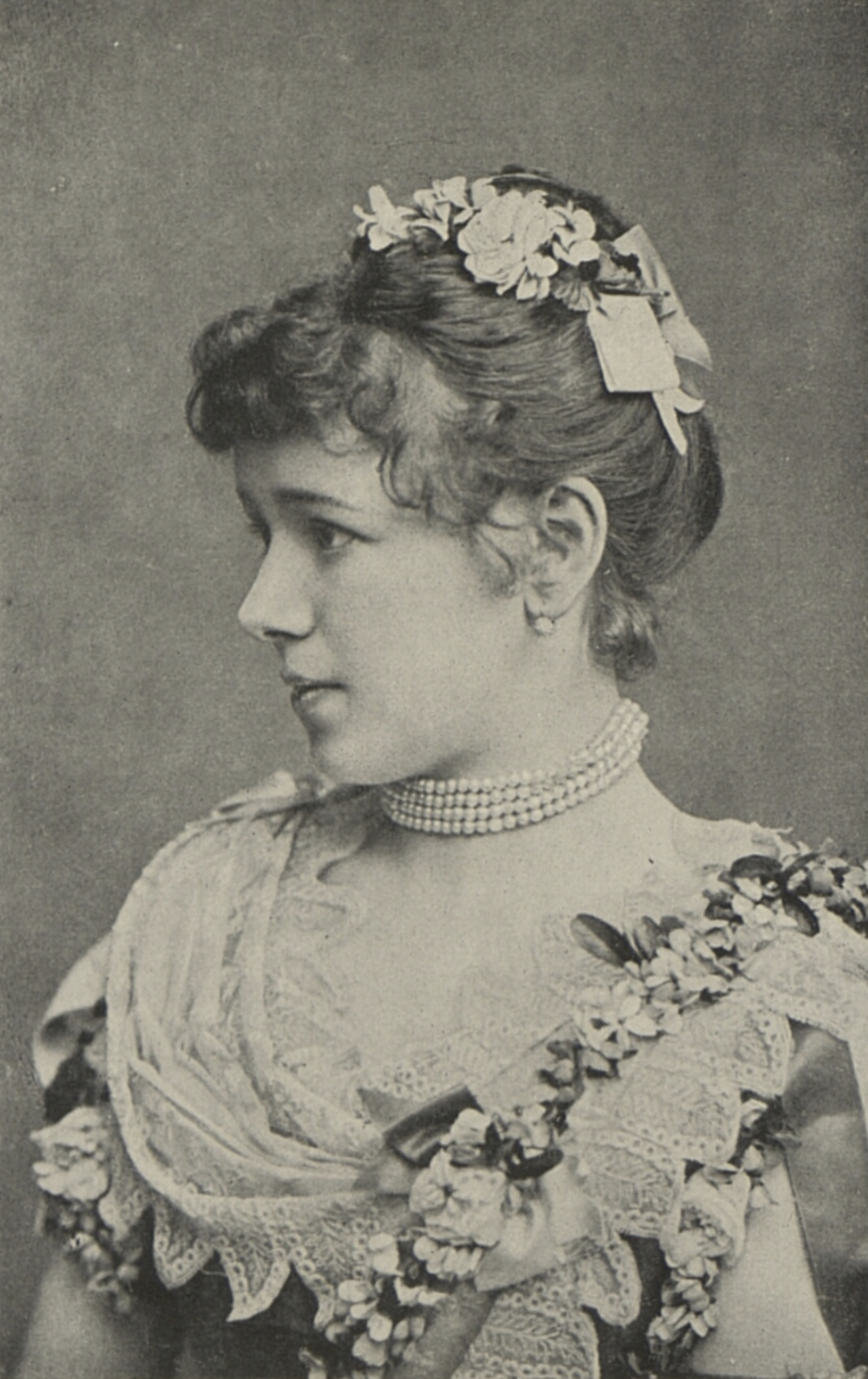
Hana Kvapilová

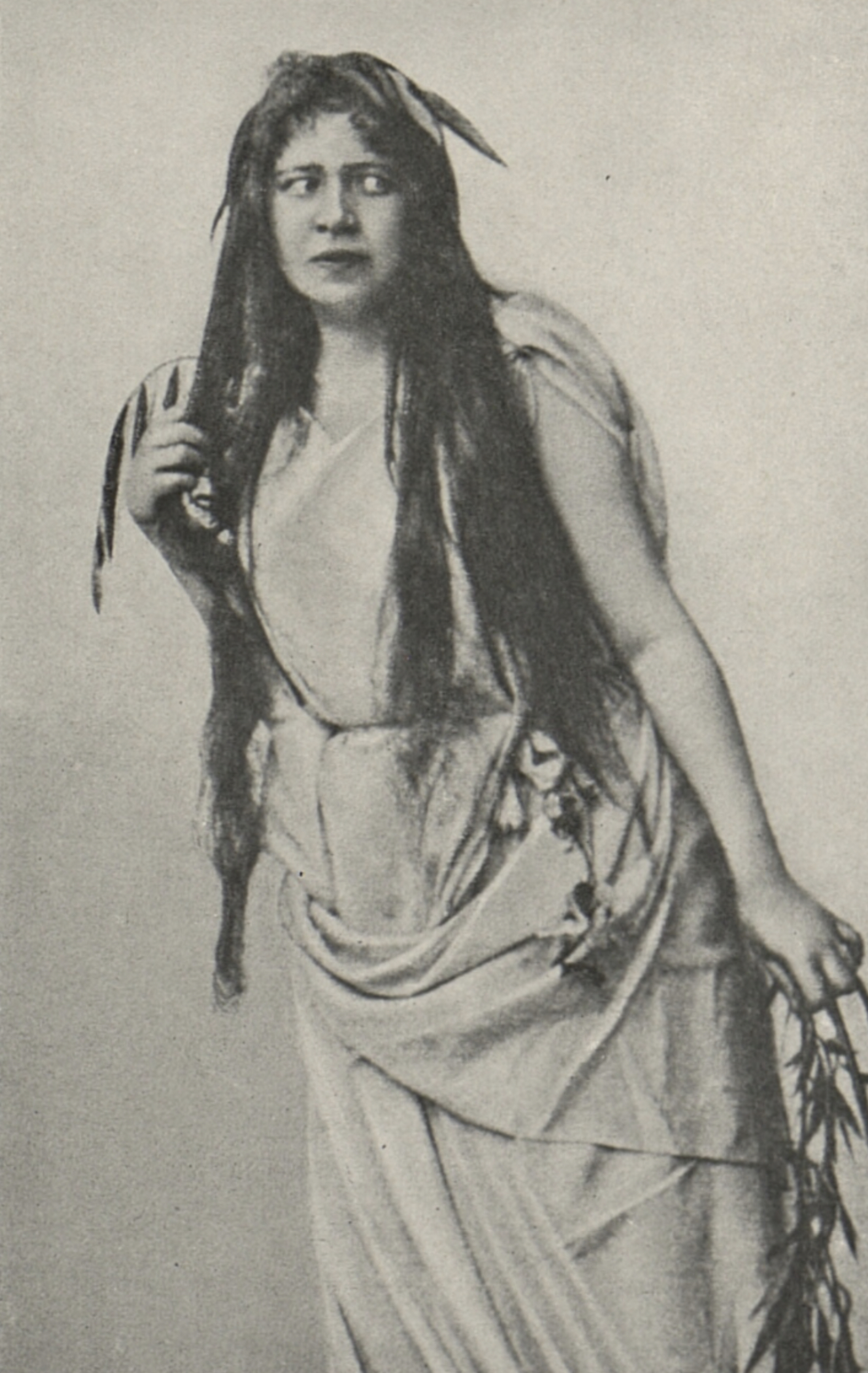
Hana Kvapilová as Ophelia

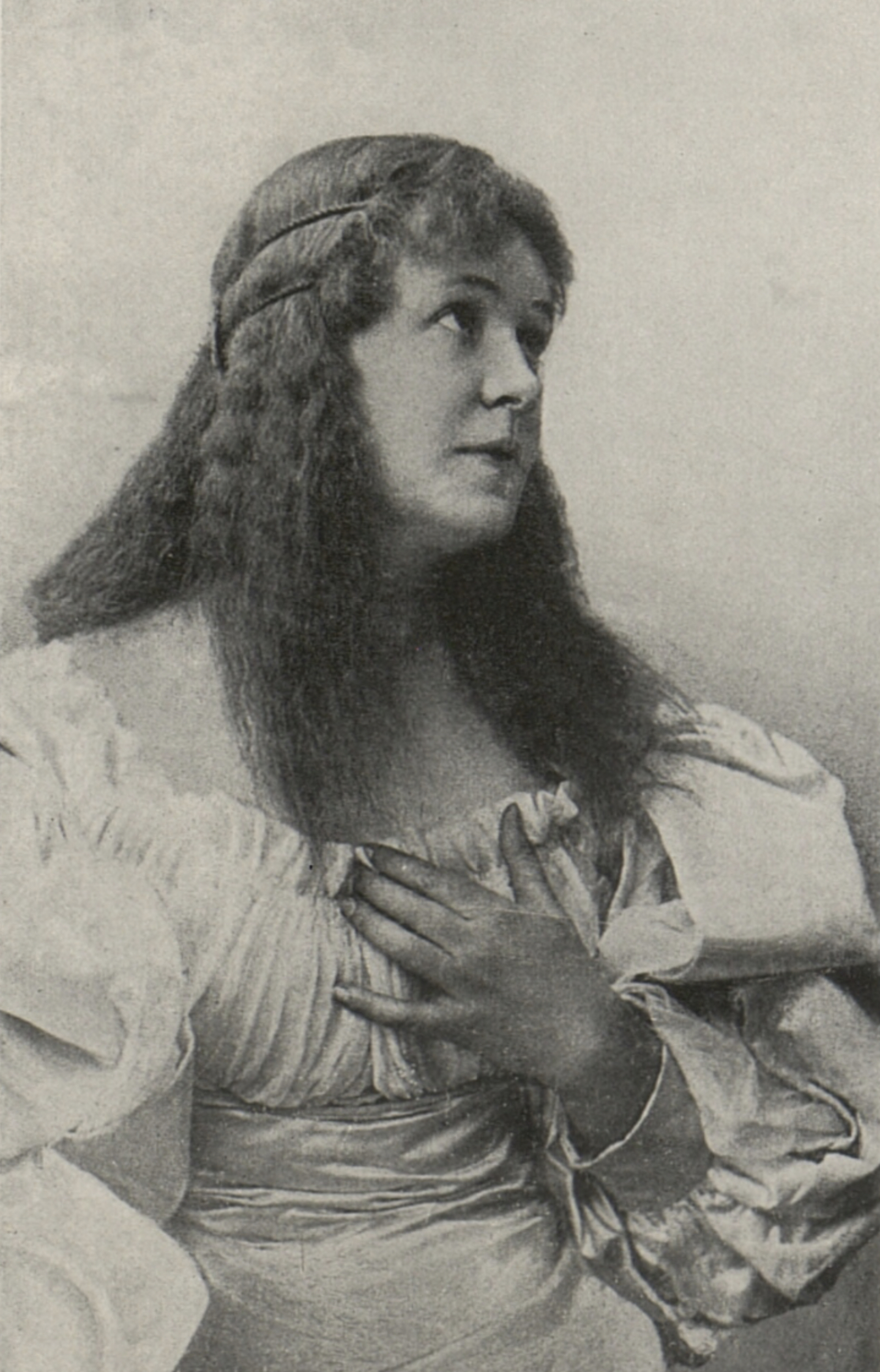
Hana Kvapilová in a Renaissance costume

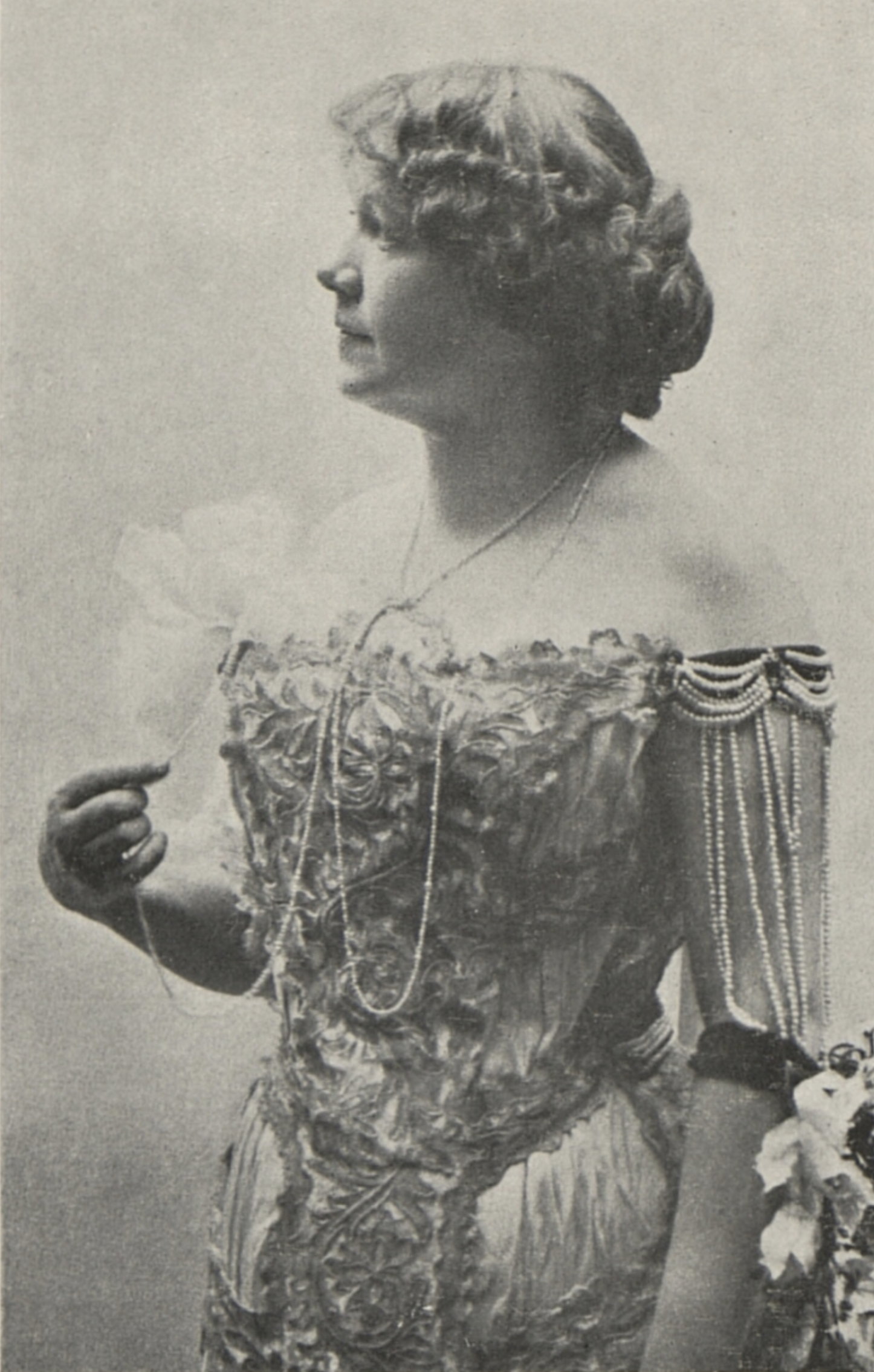
Hana Kvapilová

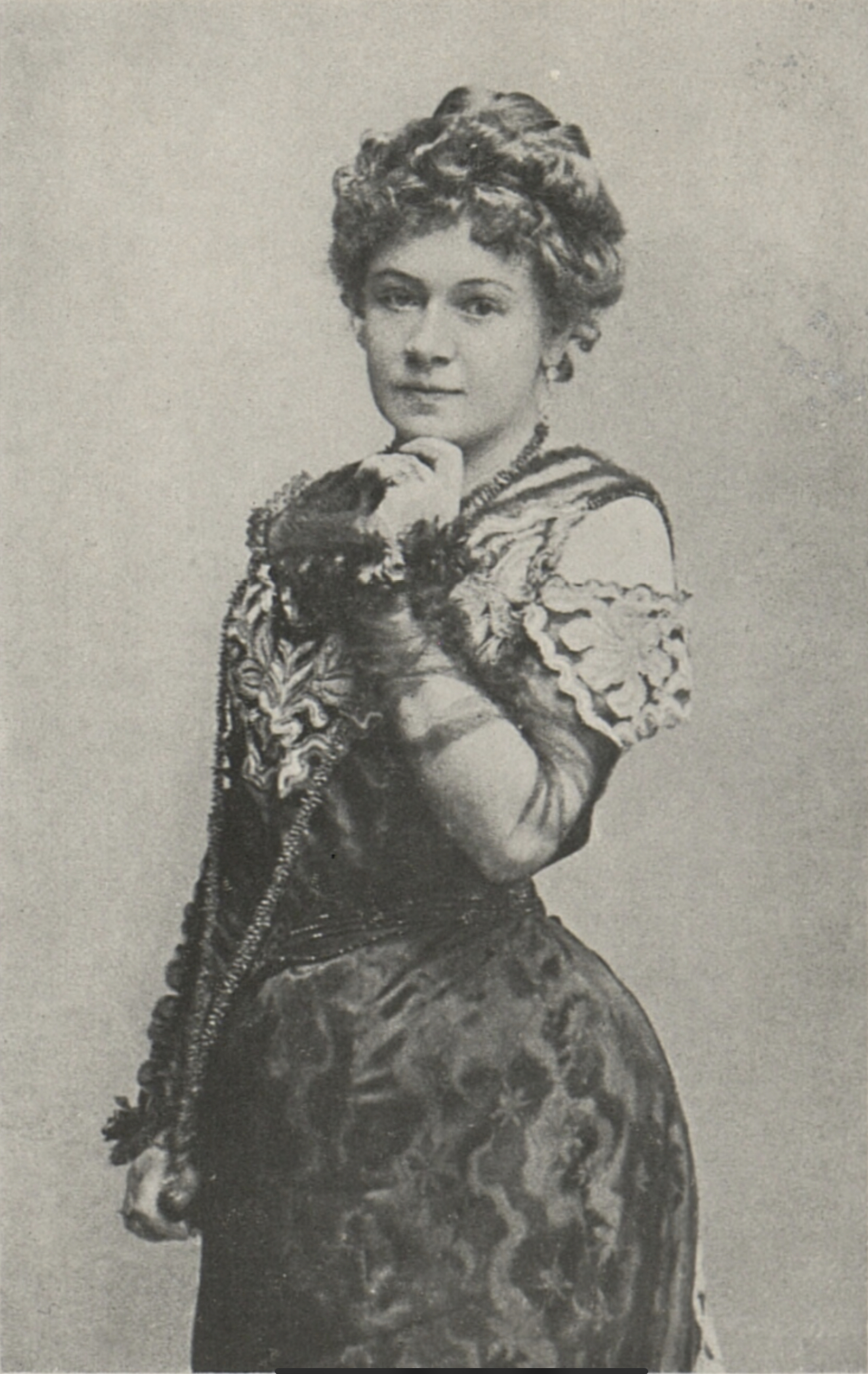
Hana Kvapilová in Marco Praga's An Ideal Woman

Hana Kvapilová was one of the leading Czech actresses of her generation, an early exponent of modern psychological acting who helped introduce modern playwrights such as Henrik Ibsen or Anton Chekhov to Czech audiences.

Her acting was described as simple, warm and humanizing, and she preferred introverted and intellectual characters. Her ability to think comprehensively about the character won her the favor of many Czech playwrights such as Jaroslav Vrchlický and Julius Zeyer.

She was an interpreter of Ibsen's female characters – Nora Helmer, Rebecca West and Petra Stockmann – as well as Shakespeare's heroines – Ophelia, Rosalind and Portia; Ophelia was among her best-known performances.

She disliked the outward, overly emotional, demonstrative acting popular at the time, valuing instead intimate, realistic expression. She avoided roles requiring wild passion or romantic sentimentality, as well as "salon" roles. She emphasized the characters' dramatic inner life, seeking tragic underpinnings even in comic roles.

Her strength in acting lay in non-verbal expression – facial expression and the conveying of emotion without words. Her "hand talk" was widely-noted, and she used pauses in her speeches to emphasize meaning.
