= Anna Lauermannová-Mikšová =

Czech writer

Anna Lauermannová-Mikšová (née Anna Anselma Miksche; 15 December 1852 – 16 June 1932), known under her pen name Felix Téver, was a Czech writer and socialite whose salon drew people from the leading literary and political circles of late 19th-century and early 20th-century Prague.

== Life ==
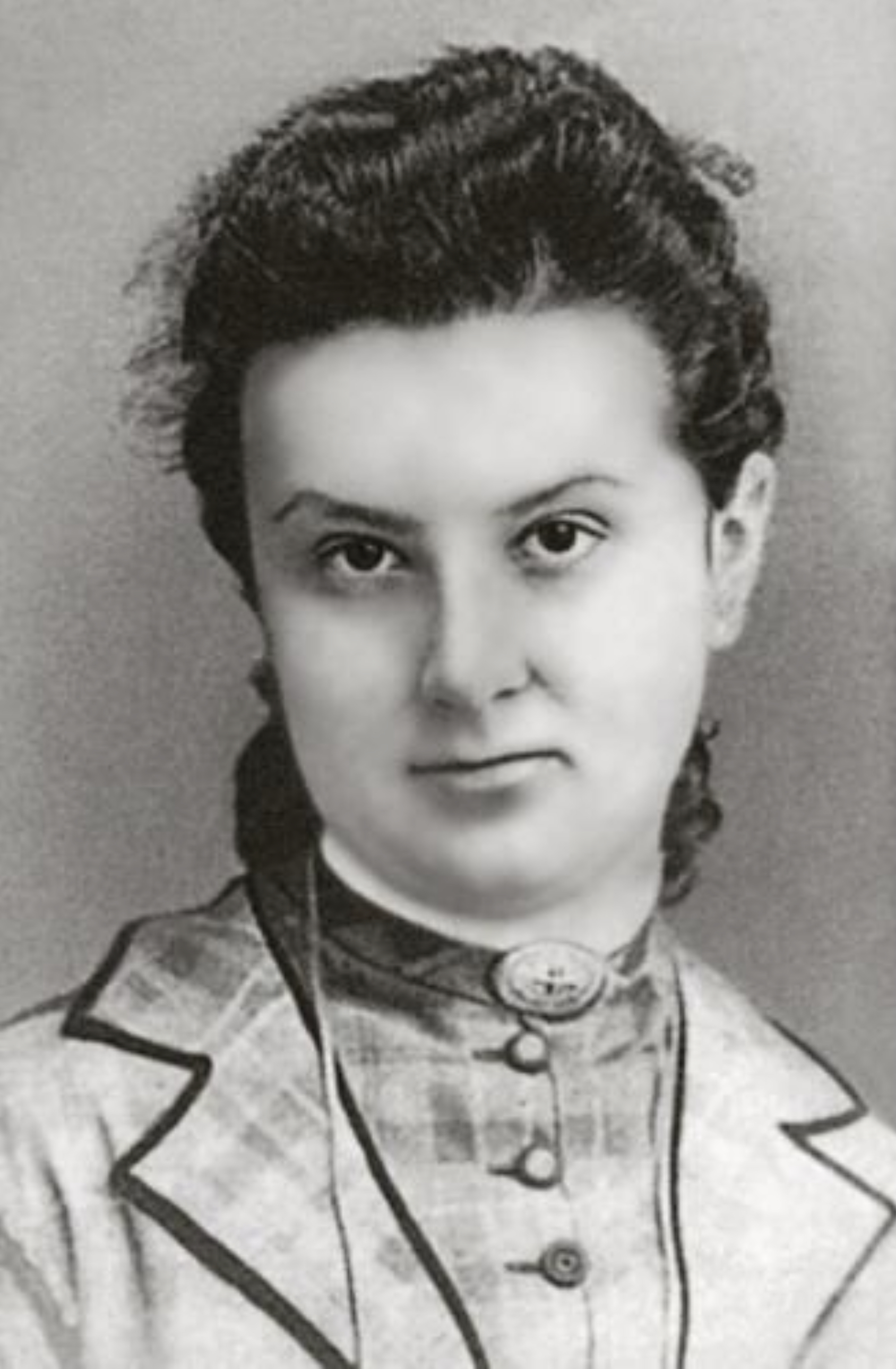
Anna Lauermannová-Mikšová

Lauermannová-Mikšová was born on 15 December 1852 in Prague-Old Town as the younger daughter of the Prague physician and obstetrician Mikuláš Miksche.

Her childhood was not happy. Her mother suffered from a mental illness. She studied girl's college and learned German, French and Italian. She attended art classes led by Amálie Mánesová, sister of famous painter Josef Mánes where she met her life-long friend Marie Riegerová, daughter of the head of Czech politics, František Ladislav Rieger.

In 1875 she married Josef Lauermann. He soon developed a serious mental illness. She described her experiences from her marriage in an autobiographical novel, Strange History (Podivná historie): Carlo (a character inspired by her husband) he raved all night, he did not let me sleep..., he tortured me with questions. I was already so tired from the previous sleepless nights that I fell asleep even with his lamentations - he poured water on me to wake me up. … Sometimes I wish more passionately for you to have a blind eye, to have a deadly sight, an annoying sight. Hate and contempt run through my veins instead of blood."

== Literary salon ==
František Ladislav Rieger came up with the idea of a literary salon. According to Lauermann's recollections, he said: “You have a bad mouth, but you have what the French call politesse du bon coeur, And you also have a lot of space, so hopefully it will work out.” The women of Rieger's family (wife and daughters) were rather introverted and did not seek out company. Rieger saw the literary salon as an important tool for the development of the Czech cultural community, at the same time he often entrusted important posts to people from his surroundings in the hope that he would retain his influence.

Lauermann started a Czech literary salon in the early 1890s. She was talkative and sociable, liked people, but also social gossip, and agreed to open her house to Czech writers and intellectuals.

In 1885 she fell ill with lung disease. She was forced to close the salon and went abroad with her mother, daughter Olga and nanny for several years. She first lived in Montreux, Switzerland, but after a bad experience with a Swiss doctor who predicted she would die, she traveled to Nice, France. Rome in particular became her favorite city. She opened her Roman home to Czech travelers and organized patriotic evenings for them.

After her returning to Prague, she separated from her husband starting in 1888. The marriage legally ended with the death of Josef Lauermann in 1905. For Czech society, however, Lauermann had the stigma of a "slightly deformed woman" (Czech: trochu předělaná ženská) for several years.

In 1890s her stigma diminished and she re-opened her salon and Czech cultural elite was meeting there until 1920s. Lauermann was friends with a number of leading writers, such as Julius Zeyer, Gabriela Preissová, Jiří Karásek ze Lvovic, Karel Čapek Otakar Theer, and many others.

== Private life ==
Her strongest romance with historian Jaroslav Goll took place between 1897 and 1913. Their emotional involvement was mutual, although they were meeting only at social gatherings and exchanged letters, but with long breaks it lasted over fifteen years. Goll was flirting with Lauermann while his wife Amely Goll, a pianist, played the piano at the parties he accompanied her to. Goll's wife became eventually very jealous of Lauermann, and Lauermann remarked of her: "at one time she took away from me everything that my heart held dear."

One of her most dedicated suitors was director of the National Theatre František Šubert. He visited her salon in 1884 and in 1887 visited her in Rome. He proposed to her several times, but she refused. She despised his numerous love affairs that the director had with actresses and dancers of the troupe and believed that Šubert was "somewhat devoted to carnal pleasures and she, in her strict ethics, would perhaps be uncomfortable for him" Lauermann called him Don Juan and “erotic”. In the same time, she took him for a decent respectable gentleman. She claimed that women were seducing him, that he, though in a position of power, was controlled by them. She wrote in her diary: "Perhaps - perhaps - perhaps Gabriela Preissová is right with her somewhat crude interpretation: "He got them all, but because he didn't get her, he loves me." However, she defended him in public and supported him even against critics of his sexual morality. She despised women who refused him sexual obedience, such as the actress Maria Pospischil. At the same time, Lauermann had been a victim of violence caused by her husband, and also, for example, by friend's father František Ladislav Rieger (her diary entry from 1 June 1891: "Then he took my hand, pulled me into the room and spoke in a flattering voice - Well girl, take care of me a little – I'm so abandoned now (after the death of Rieger's wife) – and what would it do to you if you took care of me a little, took care of me a little, eh? And he wanted to press me again - I felt a tremendous revulsion against the old man. What are men, what is their love for us, when this 73-year-old man, whose wife he lived with for 40 years, is barely beginning to rot, is longing again for – what really?")

She died in Prague on 16 June 1932.

== Literary work ==
She was also a writer, using pen name Felix Téver, inspired by her happy time in Rome at the Tiber river (Tevere in Italian). She wrote realistic short stories and novels about rich Prague bourgeoisie. She often addressed women's issues.

Lauermann kept private diaries from 1872 until 1929, these were published in 1941. She recorded her feelings, drafts of her literary works, social gossip and events from her surroundings.
