= Ladislav Stroupežnický =

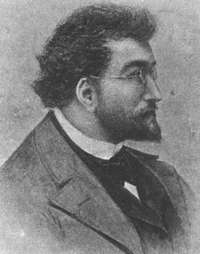

Ladislav Stroupežnický (6 January 1850 – 11 August 1892) was a Czech author, playwright, and dramatist, best known for the frequently staged play Naši furianti.

== Life ==
He was born at Cerhonice and attended high school at Písek, but was expelled and had to return to work on the family farm. Early in 1867, he was involved in a mysterious incident which resulted in the suicide of a childhood friend named Jan Aleš. On 11 August 1867 Stroupežnický mistakenly fired his gun at the gamekeeper's son, who mimed death; thinking he had killed another acquaintance, he shot himself in the face, but survived, losing his nose and lower jaw. They were later replaced with elaborate prostheses.

After a long period of recovery he moved to Prague and worked for the city council and then for an insurance company, meanwhile writing pieces for humour magazines.

In 1882 he started writing for the newly opened National Theatre. His first plays were not successful but his reputation slowly grew. His lack of literary education prevented him from becoming director, but he ably handled administrative matters and helped the theatre become financially successful. He married in 1890, but fell seriously ill soon afterwards, possibly as a result of overwork and the hostility of co-workers.

== Death ==
He died in 1892, on the 25th anniversary of his suicide attempt, and was buried in Olšany Cemetery.

== Works ==
=== Plays ===
- Noviny a karty ("Papers and Cards", 1875)
- Pan Měsíček, obchodník ("Mr Moonchick, Businessman", 1877)
- Černé duše ("Black Soul", 1877)
- V ochraně Napoleona ("Napoleon's Defence", 1878)
- Zvíkovský rarášek ("Zvíkov's Imp", 1883)
- Triumfy vědy ("Triumphs of Science", 1884)
- Velký sen ("Big Dream", 1884)
- Paní mincmistrová ("Mistress of the Mint", 1885)
- Christoforo Colombo ("Christopher Columbus", 1886)
- Naši furianti ("Our Young Bucks", 1887)
- V panském čeledníku ("The Servants' Quarters", 1887)
- Sirotčí peníze ("Orphans' Money", 1887)
- Václav Hrobnický z Hrobnic (1888)
- Vojtěch Žák, výtečník ("Student Vojtěch, the Paragon", 1890)
- Zkažená krev ("Tainted Blood", 1891)
- Na Valdštejnské šachtě ("Waldstein Shaft", 1892)

=== Prose works ===
- Humoristické čtení ("Humorous reads", 1875)
- Cavani (1878)
- Rozmarné historky ("Funny stories", 1879)
- Povídky a novely ("Stories and Tales", 1881)
- Synové grafitového rytíře ("Sons of the Graphitic Knights", 1881)
- Z Prahy a venkova ("Prague and the Country", 1891)

=== Poetry ===
- Na stepi – epic poem
- Rabiho perla – epic poem
- Den soudu – epic poem
