= Jaroslav Hilbert =

Czech dramatist and writer (1871–1936)

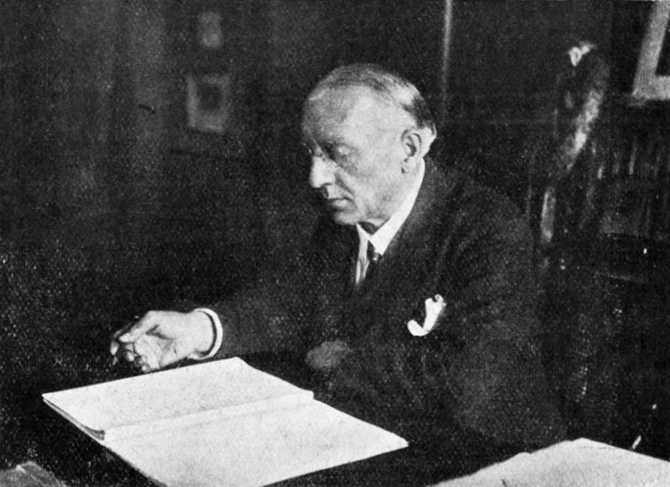
- Hilbert before 1931
- Born: 19 January 1871; Louny, Bohemia, Austria-Hungary
- Died: 10 May 1936 (aged 65); Prague, Czechoslovakia
- Occupations: Dramatist, writer
- Years active: 1891–1934

Jaroslav Hilbert (19 January 1871 – 10 May 1936) was a Czech dramatist and writer. His most famous works include Guilt (1896), The Pariahs (1900), Falkenstein (1903), and Nest in the storm (1919).
