= Jaroslav Kvapil =

Czech poet, theatre director, translator, playwright and librettist

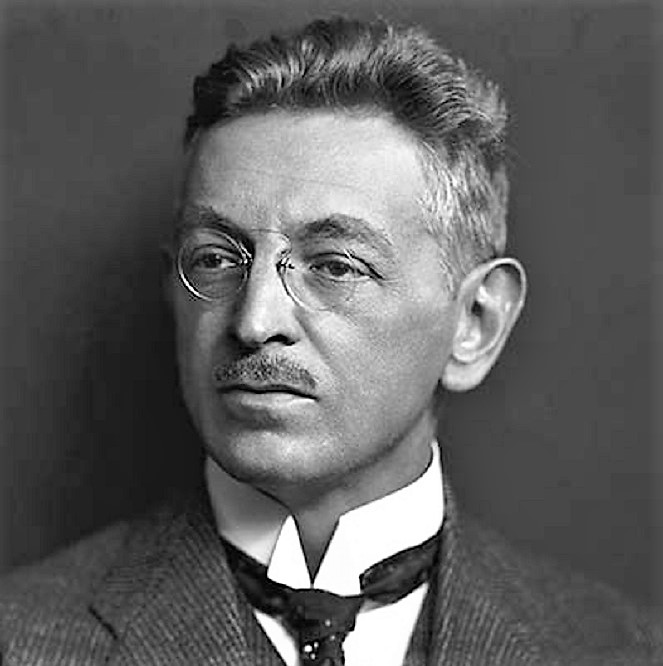
- Jaroslav Kvapil in 1940
- Born: 25 September 1868; Chudenice, Bohemia, Austria-Hungary
- Died: 10 January 1950 (aged 81); Prague, Czechoslovakia
- Occupations: Poet, theatre director, translator, playwright, librettist

Signature
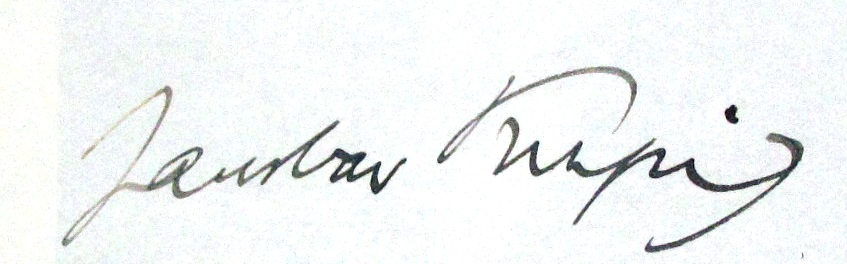

Jaroslav Kvapil (25 September 1868 – 10 January 1950) was a Czech poet, theatre director, translator, playwright and librettist.

== Early life, education and family ==
Jaroslav Josef Kvapil was born on 25 September 1868 in Chudenice, into the family of a physician. He attended schools in Klatovy and Plzeň and graduated from the secondary school in 1886. He then gradually tried to study three fields (medicine, philology, law) at the Charles University, but finished none of them.

Jaroslav Kvapil was married to actress Hana Kvapilová (née Kubešová) from 1894 until she died in 1907. They met in 1890. In 1910 he married for the second time, this time to actress Zdenka Rydlová (1884–1955). They had a daughter, Eva.

== Career and late life ==
In 1888, Kvapil made his literary debut when he published his poems in the Světozor magazine. From 1891, he worked as a journalist. From 1900, he was a director and Dramaturg at the National Theatre in Prague, where he introduced plays by Anton Chekhov, Henrik Ibsen and Maxim Gorky into the repertory. Later he was a director at the Vinohrady Theatre (1921–1928). He wrote six plays, but is today chiefly remembered as the librettist of Antonín Dvořák's Rusalka.

Kvapil was the principal author of the Manifesto of Czech writers of 1917, signed by over two hundred leading Czechs, favouring the concept of Czech self-government.

He was a prominent freemason. From 1923 to 1924 he was the first Grand Master of the National Grand Lodge of Czechoslovakia.

Kvapil died on 10 January 1950 in Prague, aged 81. He had a state funeral. He was buried in Prague, but since 1955, his ashes have been in the family tomb in Chudenice.
