= Eduard Vojan =

Czech actor (1853–1920)

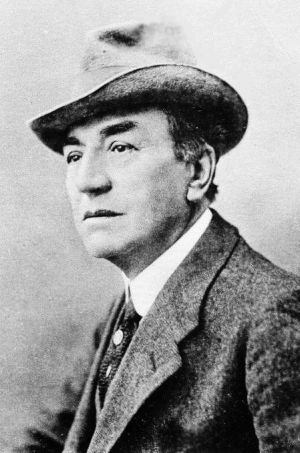
- Eduard Vojan
- Born: 5 May 1853; Prague
- Died: 31 May 1920 (aged 67); Malá Strana
- Resting place: Olšany Cemetery
- Occupation: Actor

Signature
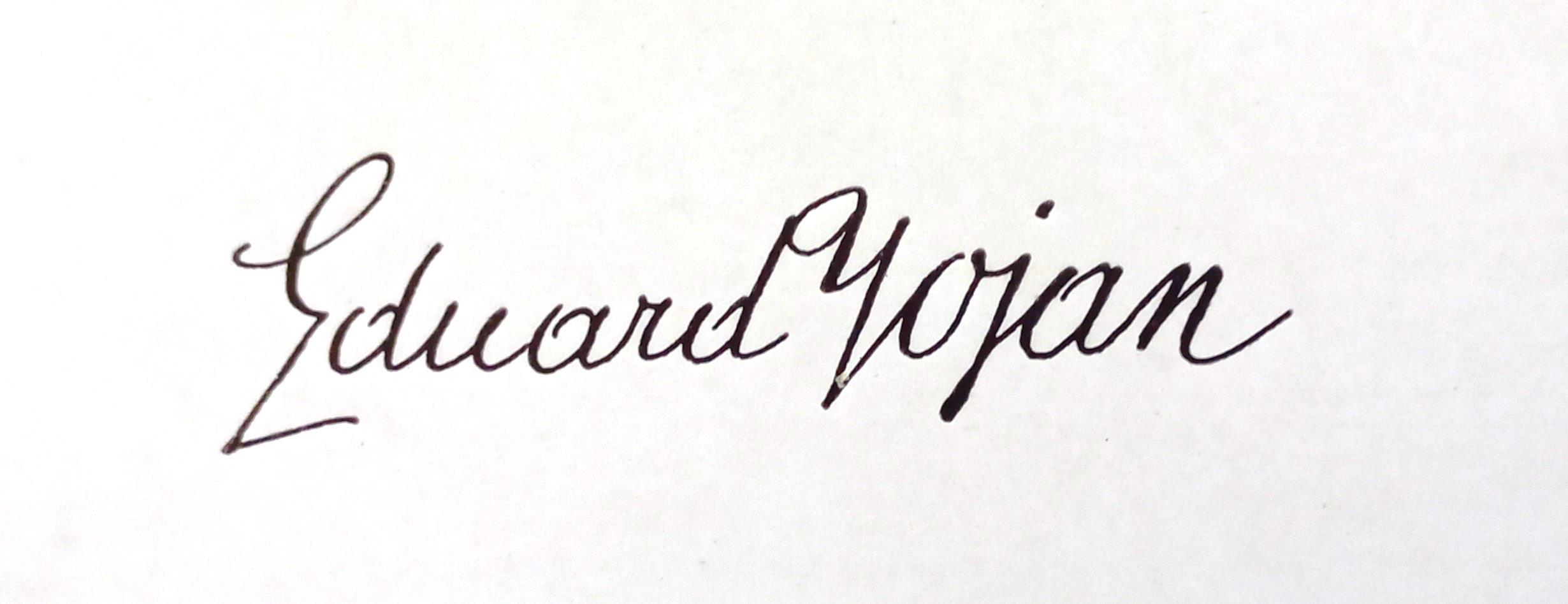

Eduard Vojan (5 May 1853 – 31 May 1920) was a Czech actor of early cinema.

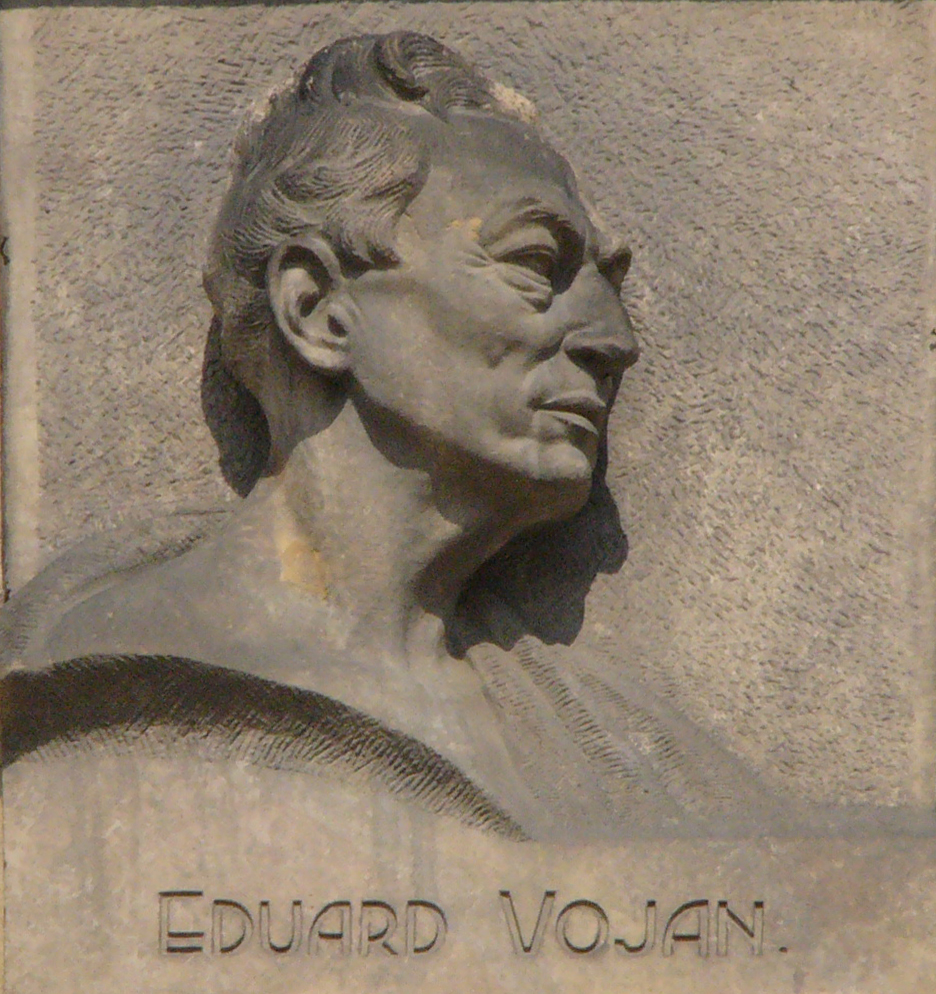
Relief of Eduard Vojan

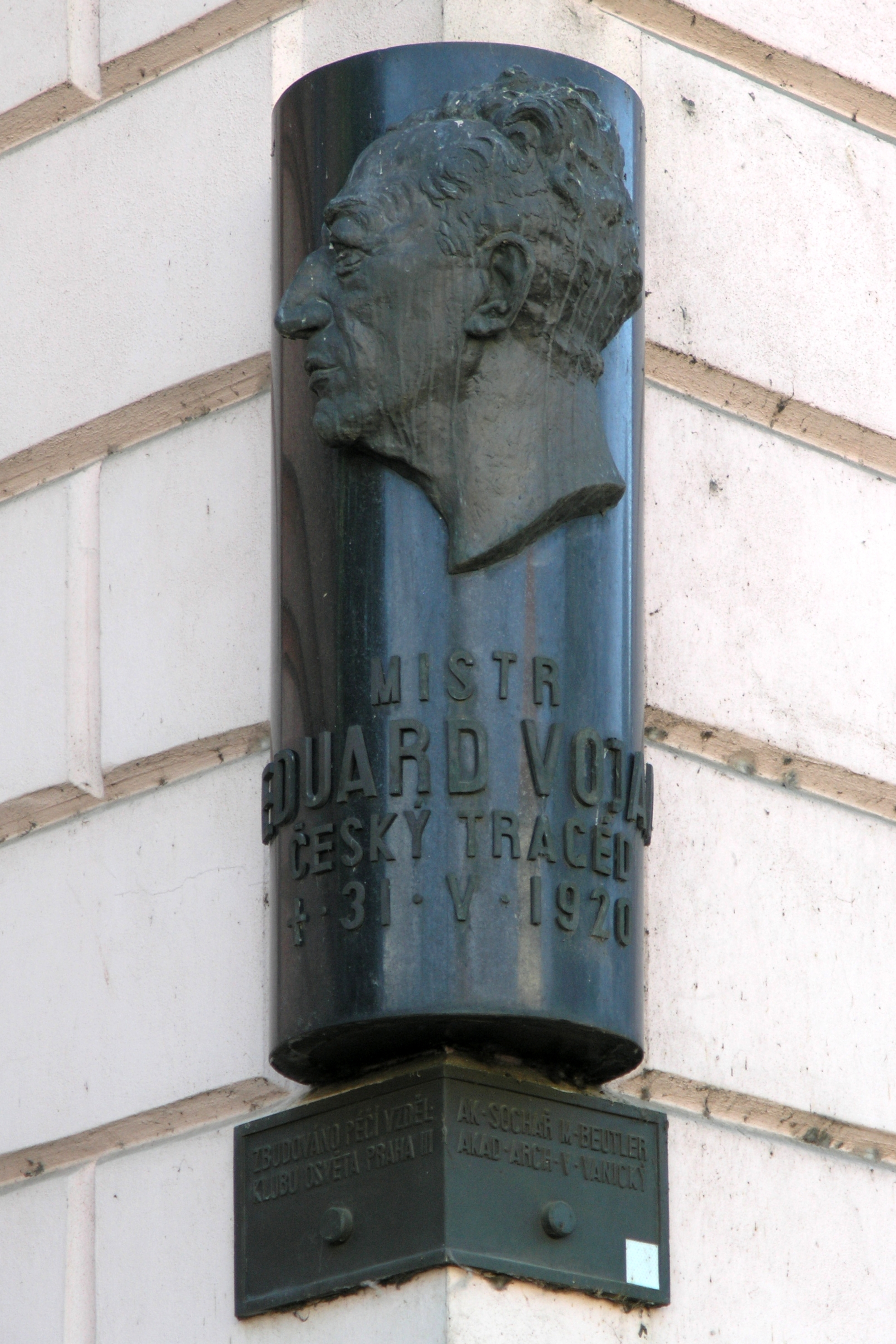
Plaque to Eduard Vojan

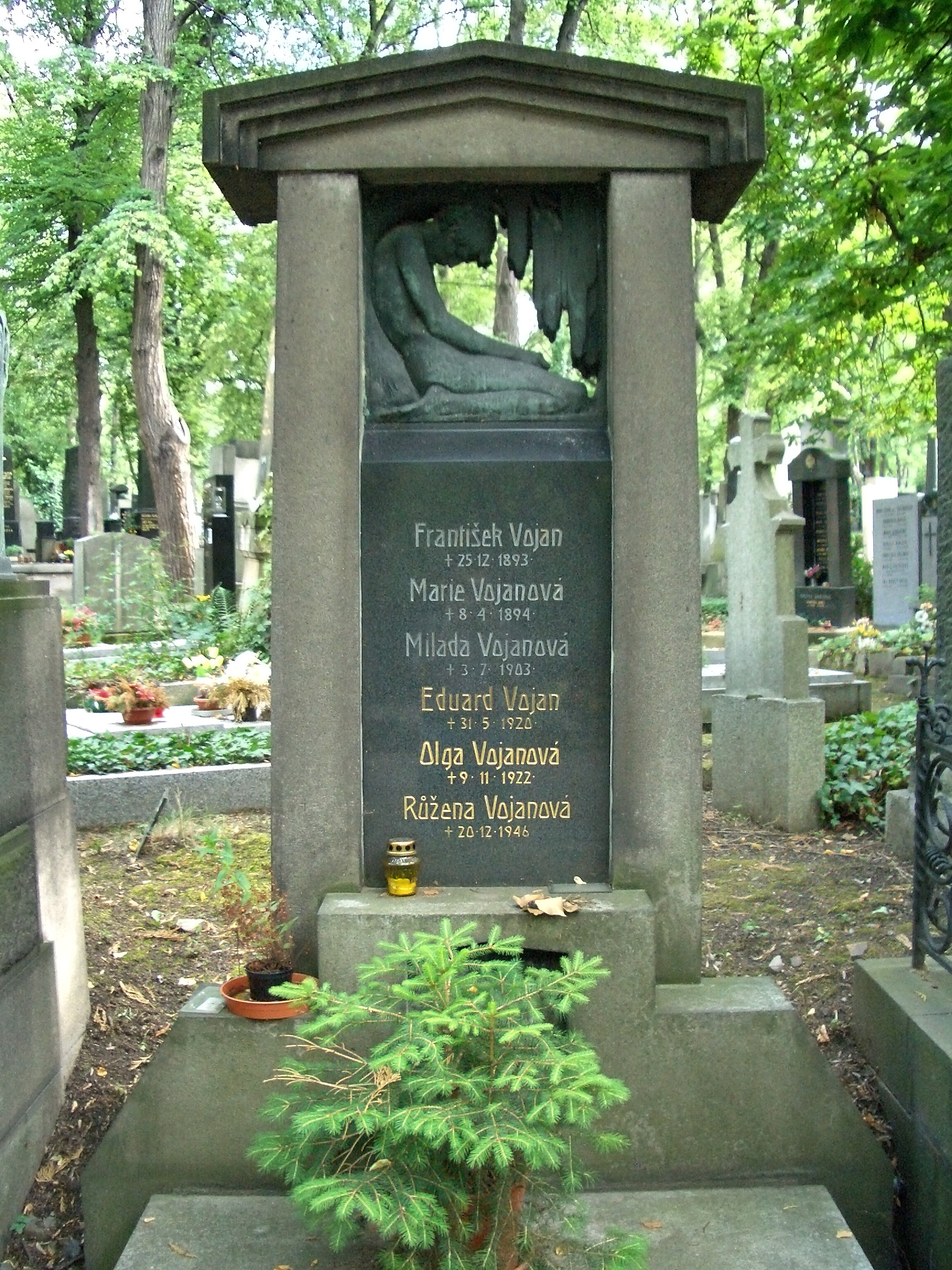
Grave of Eduard Vojan
