= Růžena Svobodová =

Czech writer (1868–1920)

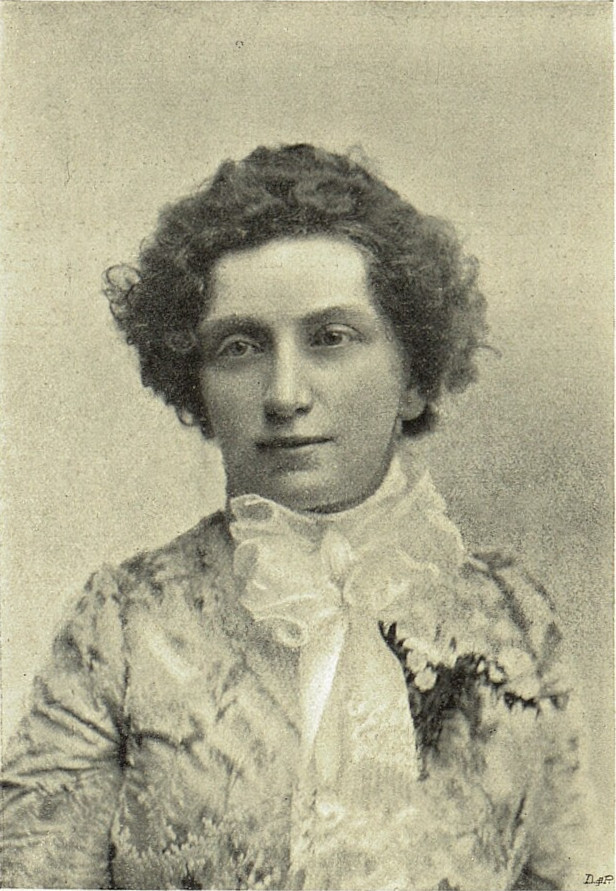
Svobodová in a 1905 publication

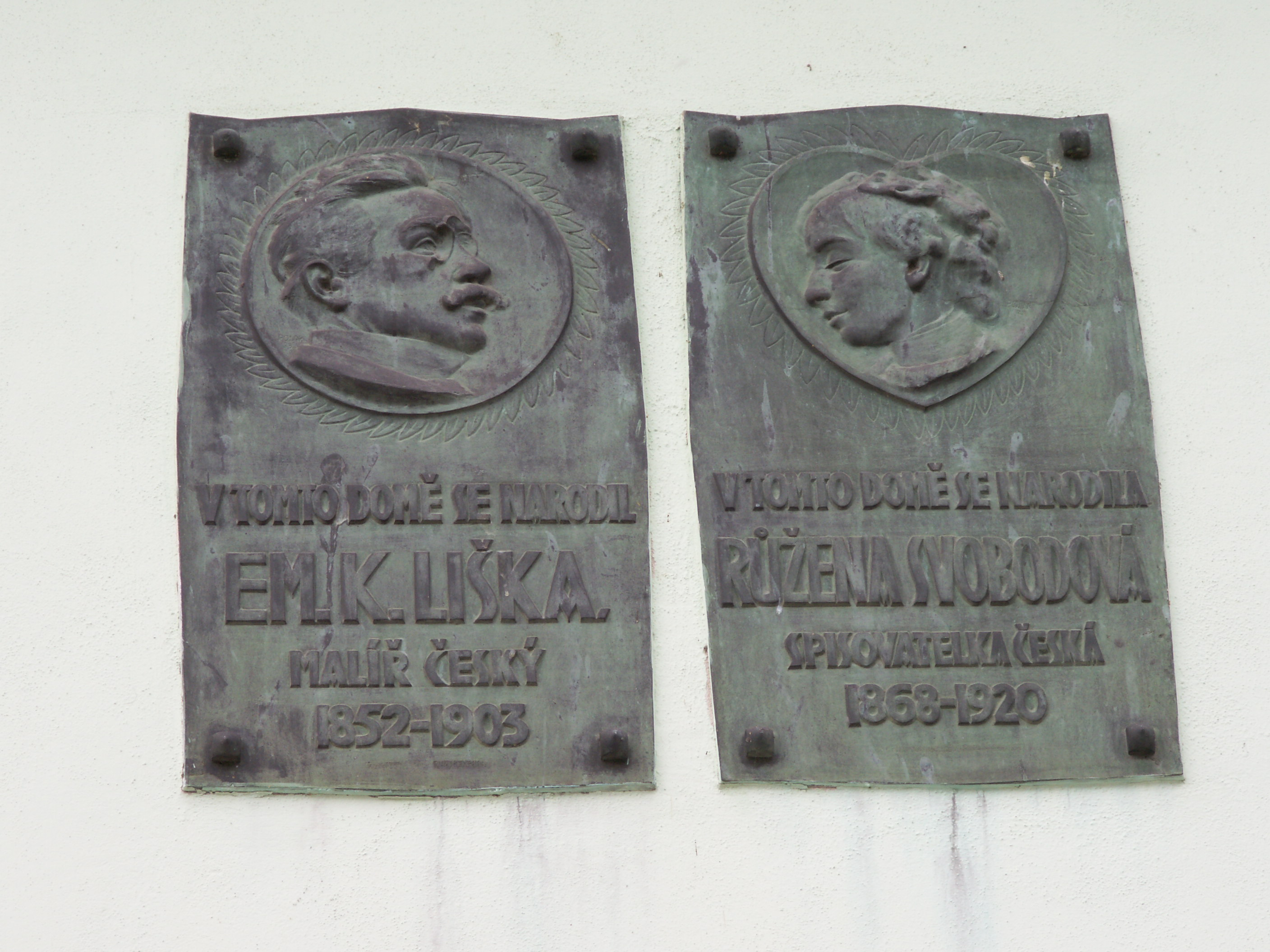
Memorial plaques in Mikulovice, commemorating Svobodová and artist Emanuel Krescenc Liška

Růžena Svobodová (née Růžena Čápová; 10 July 1868 – 1 January 1920) was a Czech writer.

== Early life ==
Růžena Čápová was born in Mikulovice, a market town in southern Moravia, Austria-Hungary. Her family moved to Prague when she was a child. When she was 12, her father died, and the surviving widow and children moved out of the city, but Růžena was sent to schools in Prague.

== Career ==
Růžena Svobodová wrote short stories and novels, often focused on female characters' lives, including Na písčité půdě (On the Sandy Soil, 1895), Ztroskotáno (Wrecked, 1896), Přetížený klas (Overloaded Ear, 1896), Zamotaná vlákna (Wrapped Fibers, 1899), Milenky (1902), Pěšinkami srdce (The Heart Walks, 1902), Plameny a plaménky (Flames and Cleanses, 1905), Marné lásky (Merciful Love, 1906), Černí myslivci (Black Foresters, 1908), Posvátné jaro (Sacred Spring, 1912), Po svatební hostině (The Wedding Feast, 1916), Hrdinné a bezmocné dětství (Heroes and Helpless Childhood, 1920) and Ráj (Paradise, 1920). She is described by one scholar as "one of the creators of modern Czech prose." Another scholar described her as "a writer of powerful feminist short fiction" who later became "a sentimentalizing, emptily philosophizing novelist, crushing her natural sensualism under buckets of pretty flowers."

She was founder of a women's magazine, Zvěstování ('Annunciation') in 1919, and edited another magazine, Lipa (1918–1919), focused on arts and culture. She also hosted a literary salon, attracting artists as well as writers, including actress Hana Kvapilová, Božena Benešová, Marie Pujmanová, Antonín Sova, and Vilém Mrštík.

During World War I, she signed the Manifesto of Czech writers, and was active in organizing the charity Czech Heart, which provided food relief and rural foster homes for the children of Prague.

Her book Černí myslivci was adapted for film in 1945.

== Personal life ==
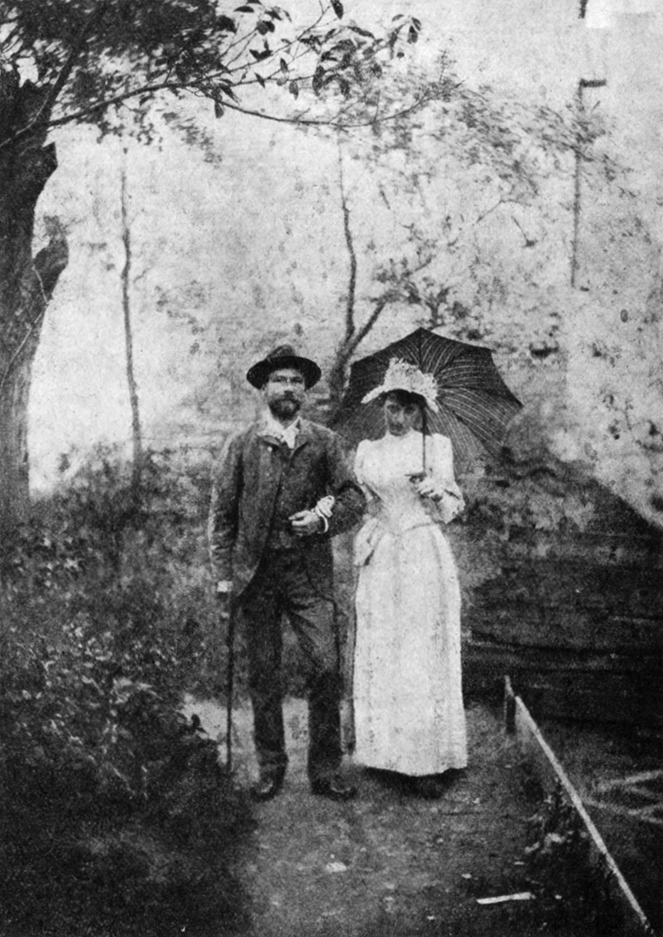
Růžena Čápová with her future husband in 1890

Růžena Čápová married František Xaver Svoboda, a poet and bank official. She also had a long relationship with František Xaver Šalda, concurrent with her marriage (in fact, Šalda introduced her to Svoboda). She died from heart trouble in 1920, aged 51 years, in Prague. Her remains were interred in Slavín (Prague), a tomb for Czech notables.
