= Slavín (Prague) =

Monumental tomb in Prague, Czech Republic

Coordinates: 50°3′52.6″N 14°25′7.6″E

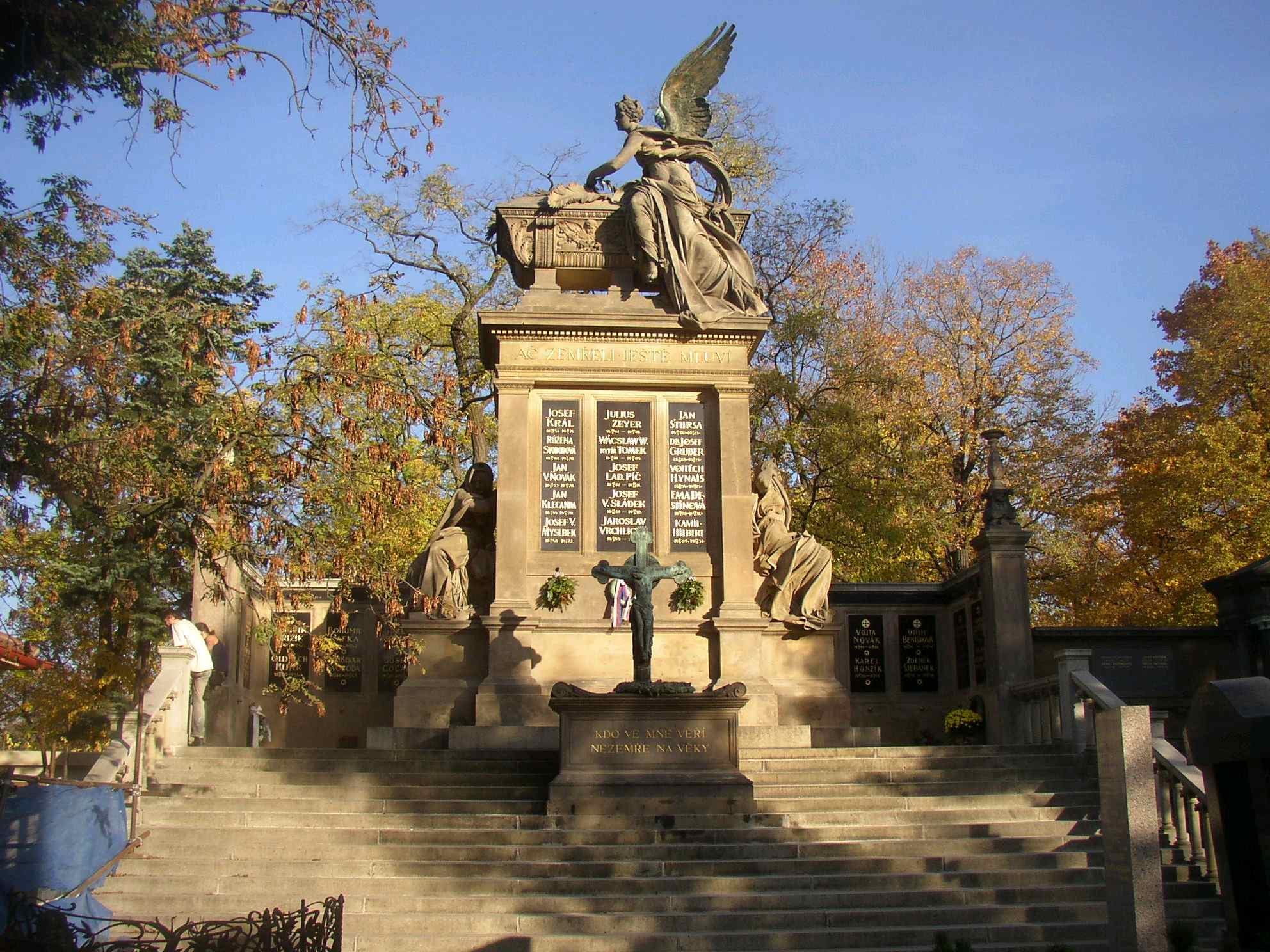
Front view

Slavín is a tomb at the Vyšehrad Cemetery in Prague, Czech Republic. It was built in 1889–1893 as a resting place for important Czech personalities. It was designed by architect Antonín Wiehl and 57 people are buried there.

== History ==
The first idea of establishing a national burial ground appeared in 1869 from politician František Ladislav Rieger and from Václav Svatopluk Štulc, who later became the provost of Vyšehrad. The specific idea of the establishment of the pantheon, a final resting place for outstanding Czech personalities, appeared in the 1880s and the initiator of the project was the Vyšehrad provost Mikuláš Karlach. Mayor of Smíchov, Petr Matěj Fischer, helped to finance the monument, when he donated 30,000 Austro-Hungarian guldens for the construction.

The monumental tomb was designed by architect Antonín Wiehl, who already built neo-Renaissance arcades in the Vyšehrad Cemetery in 1887. Slavín was built on the eastern side of the Vyšehrad Cemetery in 1889–1893. Poet Julius Zeyer was the first person to be buried in the tomb, in 1901, eight years after its completion. The remains of 57 people are interred in Slavín. The Svatobor association (originally an association to support Czech writers) has been taking care of the tomb.

=== 21st century ===
Due to the limited capacity of the tomb, burials in it ceased towards the end of the 20th century. In 2006, the remains of the conductor and composer Oskar Nedbal (died 1930) were transferred to the tomb from Zagreb. The remains of the actor Karel Höger (died 1977) were transferred to the tomb in 2013. The last person buried is the dancer Vlastimil Harapes (died 2024), who was buried there in 2026.

== Decoration ==
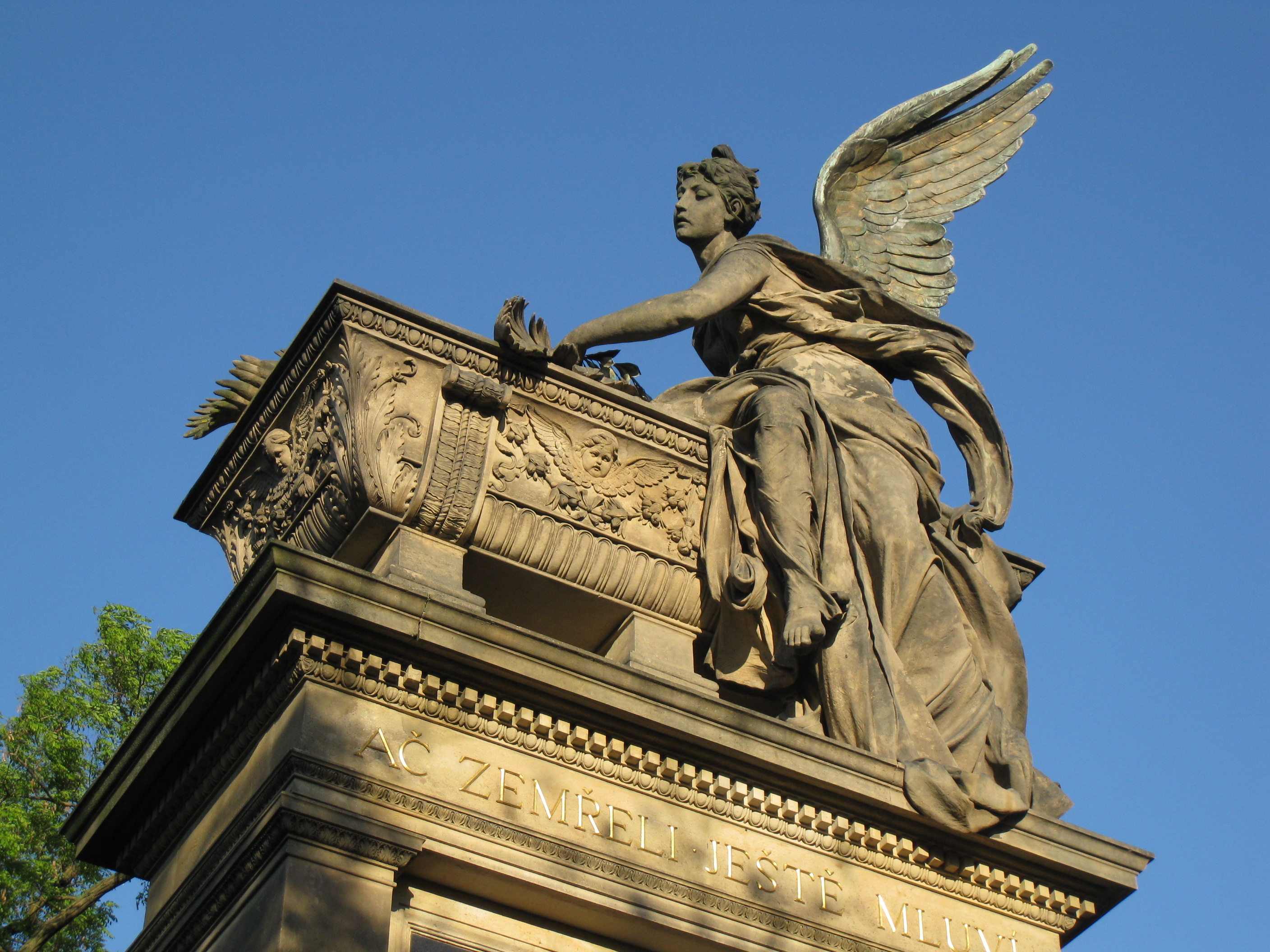
Genius of the Fatherland statue

The sculptural decorations were made by Josef Mauder in 1892–1903. Above the central monument of Slavín there is a sarcophagus, over which leans the allegorical winged figure of the Genius of the Fatherland. There are two statues on the sides of the monument, representing the Mourning Motherland (left side) and the Victorious Motherland (right side). On the front of the monument there are three plaques with the names of the first fifteen people buried in the tomb. On the sides of the monument there are other plaques with the names of the other buried; only the names of the last five buried, whose names did not fit, are missing.

The poet Julius Zeyer, who was the first buried person in the tomb, is the author of the verses on the plinths of the side statues: "Svých synů prach vlast, truchlíc, zemi vrací, Jich skutky, jásajíc, po věky lidstvu hlásá." ("The fatherland, mourning, returns the dust of its sons to the earth, Their deeds, rejoicing, proclaims to humanity for ages.") Above the nameplates is written the motto of Slavín: "Ač zemřeli, ještě mluví." ("Although they died, they still speak.")

== Interments ==
People buried in the tomb include (in the order they were buried):

- Julius Zeyer (1841–1901), poet and writer
- Václav Vladivoj Tomek (1818–1905), historian
- Josef Ladislav Píč (1847–1911), archaeologist
- Josef Václav Sládek (1845–1912), poet and translator
- Jaroslav Vrchlický (1853–1912), poet
- Josef Král (1853–1917), philologist
- Růžena Svobodová (1868–1920), writer
- Jan Václav Novák (1853–1920), literary historian
- Jan Klecanda (1855–1920), writer and journalist
- Josef Václav Myslbek (1848–1922), sculptor
- Jan Štursa (1880–1925), sculptor
- Josef Gruber (1865–1925), economist
- Vojtěch Hynais (1854–1925), painter
- Emmy Destinn (1878–1930), opera singer
- Kamil Hilbert (1869–1933), architect
- Jaroslav Hilbert (1871–1936), playwright
- Antonín Klášterský (1866–1938), poet and translator
- Alphonse Mucha (1860–1939), painter
- Jan Kubelík (1880–1940), violinist and composer
- František Křižík (1847–1941), inventor and engineer
- Oldřich Hujer (1880–1942), philologist
- Bohumil Kafka (1878–1942), sculptor
- František Xaver Svoboda (1860–1943), writer
- Josef Hora (1891–1945), poet, writer and translator
- Josef Gočár (1880–1945), architect
- Václav Špála (1885–1946), painter
- Karel Toman (1877–1946), poet
- Jan Heřman (1886–1946), pianist
- Ladislav Šaloun (1870–1946), sculptor
- Karel Engelmüller (1872–1950), theatre critic and historian
- Vilém Zítek (1890–1956), opera singer
- Jaroslav Kocian (1883–1950), violinist and composer
- Marie Pujmanová (1893–1958), writer
- Jan Lauda (1898–1959), sculptor
- Karel Honzík (1900–1960), architect
- Ferdinand Pujman (1899–1961), opera director and dramaturge
- Otakar Mařák (1872–1939), opera singer
- Karel Hoffmann (1871–1936), violinist
- Josef Štefan Kubín (1864–1965), writer
- Jaroslav Fragner (1898–1967), architect
- Antonín Pelc (1895–1967), painter
- Richard Kubla (1890–1964), opera singer
- Vojta Novák (1886–1966), actor and theatre director
- Otýlie Beníšková (1882–1967), actress
- Zdeněk Štěpánek (1896–1968), actor
- František Maxián (1907–1971), pianist
- Kamila Ungrová (1887–1972), opera singer
- Vítězslav Vejražka (1915–1973), actor
- Antonín Strnadel (1910–1975), painter
- Eduard Kohout (1889–1976), actor
- Ladislav Boháč (1907–1978), actor
- Jaroslav Marvan (1901–1974), actor
- Václav Bednář (1905–1987), opera singer
- Rafael Kubelík (1914–1996), conductor
- Oskar Nedbal (1874–1930), conductor and composer
- Karel Höger (1909–1977), actor
- Vlastimil Harapes (1946–2024), dancer and choreographer
