= Ladislav Volešák =

Czech footballer

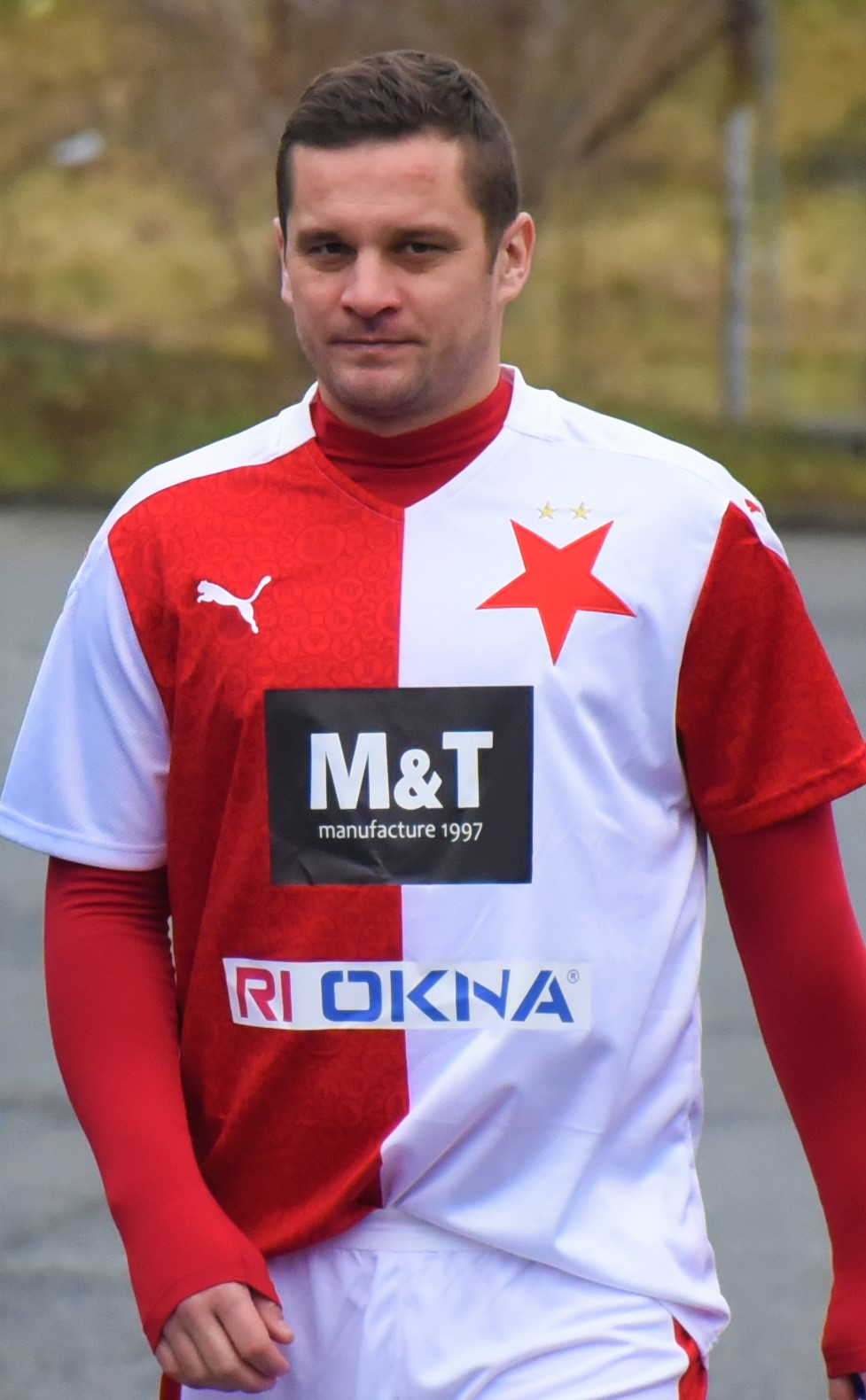

Personal information
- Date of birth: 7 April 1984 (age 42)
- Place of birth: Hradištko pod Medníkem, Czechoslovakia
- Height: 1.75 m (5 ft 9 in)
- Position: Midfielder

Team information
- Current team: Slovan Hradištko

Youth career
- 1987–1990: Slovan Hradištko
- 1990–2003: Sparta Prague

Senior career*
Years	Team	Apps	(Gls)
2003–2007	Sparta Prague	0	(0)
2004–2005	→ Mladá Boleslav (loan)	6	(0)
2006–2007	→ České Budějovice (loan)	27	(6)
2007–2010	Slavia Prague	37	(4)
2010	→ České Budějovice (loan)	11	(2)
2010–2014	Slovácko	86	(13)
2014–2015	Příbram	13	(0)
2014–2015	→ České Budějovice (loan)	16	(1)
2016–2017	Slavoj Vyšehrad	7	(1)
2017–2020	Štěchovice	74	(22)
2020–2022	Povltavska FA	34	(7)
2022–	Slovan Hradištko		

International career
2004–2007	Czech Republic U-21	8	(3)
- * Club domestic league appearances and goals as of 22 August 2017

Ladislav Volešák (born 7 April 1984, in Hradištko pod Medníkem) is a Czech football player who currently plays for Slovan Hradištko. He is an attacking midfielder and was a regular for Slavia Prague.

In January 2010 he joined SK Dynamo České Budějovice. Half year later he moved to 1. FC Slovácko. Volešák also played for youth national teams since the under-15 level.
