= Schikaneder =

Schikaneder is a German surname. Notable people with the surname include:

- Emanuel Schikaneder (1751–1812), German impresario and librettist
- Jakub Schikaneder (1855–1924), Czech painter
- Karl Schikaneder (1773–1845), actor, poet, and composer
