= Manifesto of Czech writers =

Manifesto of Czech Writers
- Created: May 1917
- Author: Jaroslav Kvapil
- Purpose: To promote support for the victory of the Allied Powers over the Central Powers during the First World War.

The Manifesto of Czech writers (Czech, Manifest českých spisovatelů) was the first public declaration in favour of the self-determination of the Czech nation during the First World War. It was published in May 1917. The declaration was directed at the Czech deputies at the Imperial Council in Vienna, the Parliament of the Austrian parts of the Austro-Hungarian Empire.

The principal author was Jaroslav Kvapil (1868–1950), director of the Czech National Theatre in Prague, and the manifesto was signed by over two hundred Czech writers, journalists and scientists. It proposed that Czech members of the Imperial Council should either declare their support for the concept of Czech autonomy or else should resign their seats.

The Manifesto was signed by Jindřich Šimon Baar, Otokar Březina, Josef Čapek, Karel Čapek, Karel Matěj Čapek-Chod, Jakub Deml, Viktor Dyk, Vladimír Helfert, Jan Herben, Adolf Heyduk, Alois Jirásek, Jan Kapras, Jan Klecanda, Karel Klostermann, Eliška Krásnohorská, Kamil Krofta, Petr Křička, Jaroslav Kvapil, Jiří Mahen, Josef Svatopluk Machar, Marie Majerová, Helena Malířová, Alois Mrštík, Zdeněk Nejedlý, Arne Novák, Ivan Olbracht, Emanuel Rádl, Karel Václav Rais, Antonín Sova, Antal Stašek, František Xaver Svoboda, Růžena Svobodová, František Xaver Šalda, Anna Marie Tilschová and others.
