= Zdenka Hásková =

Czech journalist, writer, and translator (1878–1946)

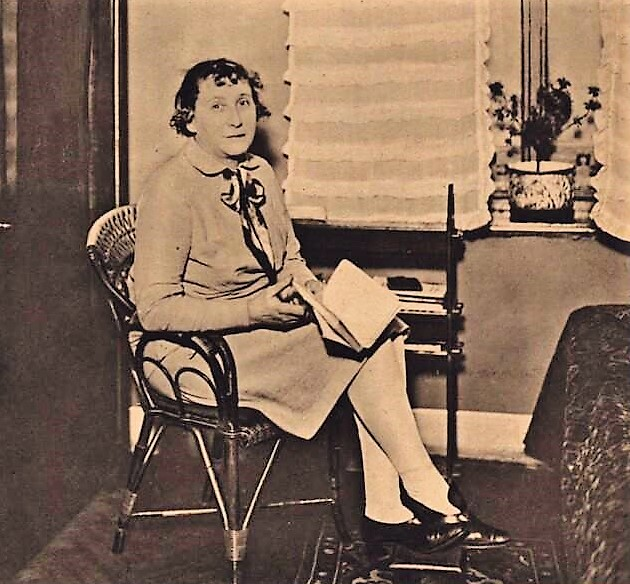
- Born: 28 May 1878; Hradištko, Bohemia, Austria-Hungary
- Died: 7 November 1946 (aged 68); Prague, Czechoslovakia
- Other names: Zdenka Dyková
- Occupations: Translator, journalist, writer
- Spouse: Viktor Dyk

Zdenka Hásková (married Zdenka Dyková; 28 May 1878 – 7 November 1946) was a Czech journalist, writer and translator.

== Life ==
Zdenka Hásková was born on 28 May 1878. Hásková's novel Mládí (1909) looked at the love lives of educated young women, and their sensation of youth passing. Her poems, collected in Cestou (1920), paid attention to everyday life with a confessional immediacy.

In 1928, she married the writer and right-wing politician Viktor Dyk, who died in 1931. She died on 7 November 1946.

== Works ==
- Mládí ('Youth'), 1909
- Cestou ('On the Way'), 1920
