= Mikulovice (Znojmo District) =

- Market town
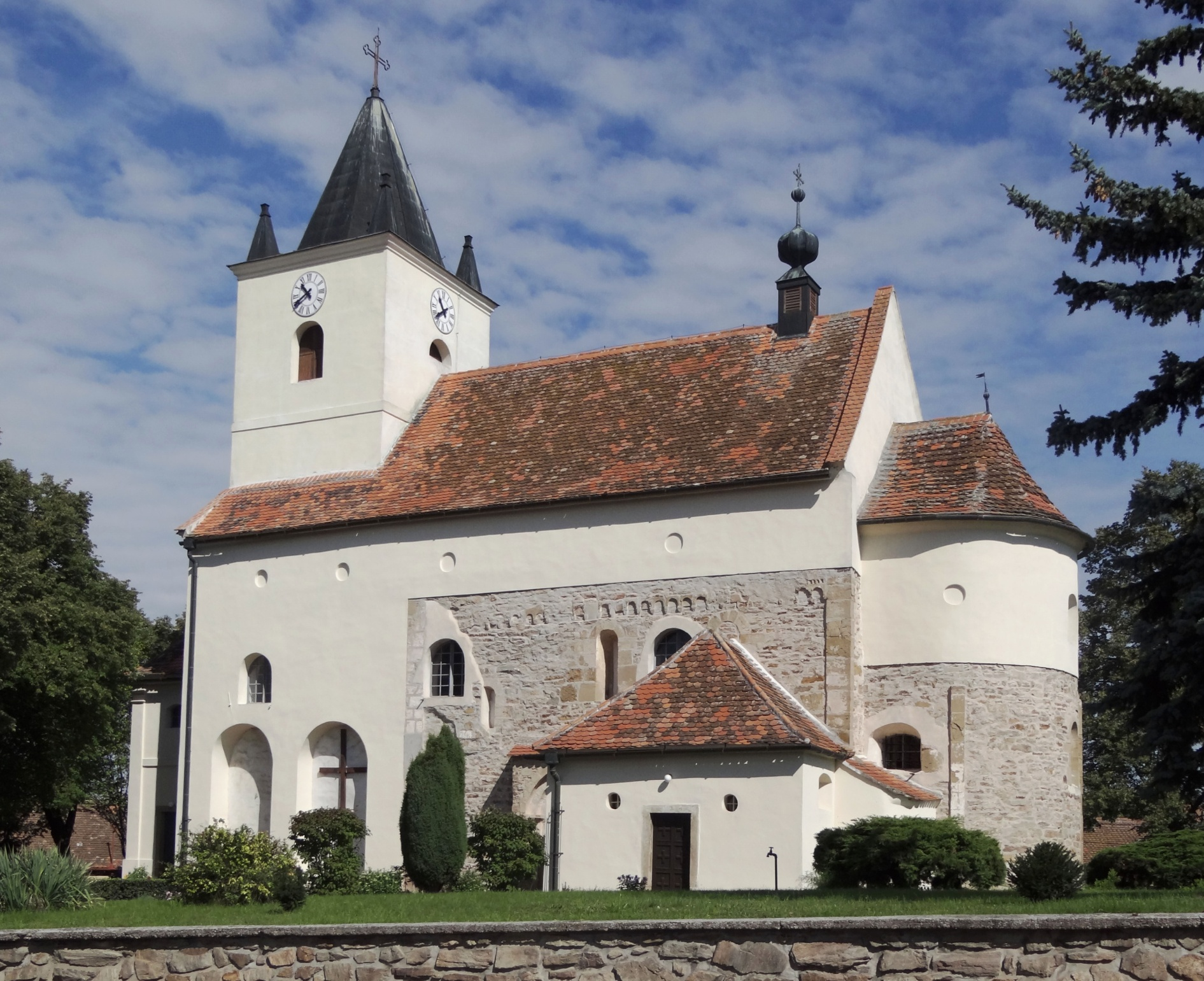
- Church of Saints Peter and Paul

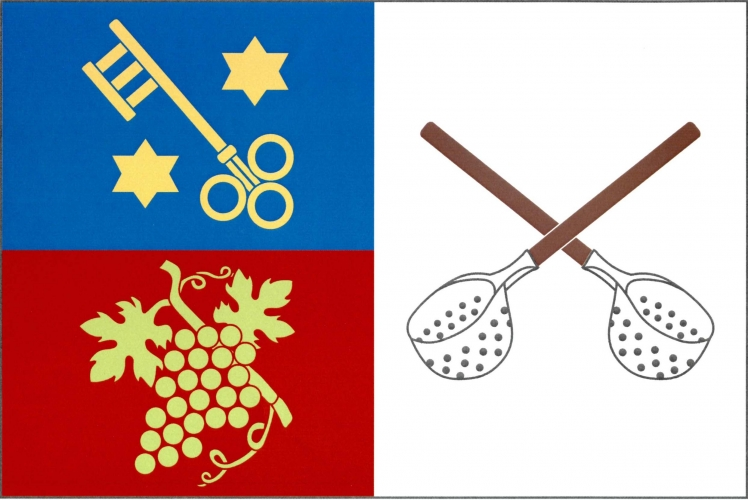
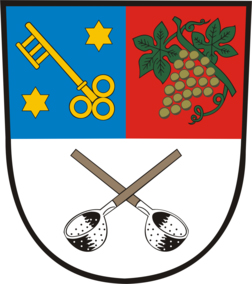
- Flag Coat of arms

- Location in the Czech Republic
- Coordinates: 48°57′25″N 16°5′41″E
- Country: Czech Republic
- Region: South Moravian
- District: Znojmo
- First mentioned: 1314

Area
  - Total: 13.76 km^{2} (5.31 sq mi)
- Elevation: 322 m (1,056 ft)

Population (2026-01-01)
  - Total: 669
  - Density: 48.6/km^{2} (126/sq mi)
- Time zone: UTC+1 (CET)
  - Summer (DST): UTC+2 (CEST)
- Postal code: 671 33
- Website: www.mikulovice.eu

Mikulovice (Czech pronunciation: [ˈmɪkulovɪtsɛ]; German: Niklowitz) is a market town in Znojmo District in the South Moravian Region of the Czech Republic. It has about 700 inhabitants.

== Geography ==
Mikulovice is located about 11 kilometres (7 mi) north of Znojmo and 44 km (27 mi) southwest of Brno. It lies in the Jevišovice Uplands. The highest point is at 365 m (1,198 ft) above sea level. The market town is situated on the right bank of the Jevišovka River. The reservoir Dunajovická přehrada, built on the Křepička Stream, is situated on the northeastern municipal border.

== History ==
The first written mention of Mikulovice is from 1314. In 1558, Mikulovice was promoted to a market town by Emperor Ferdinand I.

== Demographics ==
Historical population

Year	Pop.	±%
1869	838	—
1880	865	+3.2%
1890	813	−6.0%
1900	821	+1.0%
1910	841	+2.4%

Year	Pop.	±%
1921	802	−4.6%
1930	790	−1.5%
1950	690	−12.7%
1961	709	+2.8%
1970	654	−7.8%

Year	Pop.	±%
1980	629	−3.8%
1991	600	−4.6%
2001	602	+0.3%
2011	608	+1.0%
2021	620	+2.0%

Source: Censuses

== Transport ==
There are no railways or major roads passing through the market town.

== Sights ==
The main landmark of Mikulovice is the Church of Saints Peter and Paul. It was originally built in the Romanesque-Gothic style, but later it was extended and modified in the Renaissance and Baroque styles. Some valuable Romanesque elements have been preserved to this day.

== Notable people ==
- Emanuel Krescenc Liška (1852–1903), painter and illustrator
- Růžena Svobodová (1868–1920), writer
