= Viktor Dyk =

Czech poet, prose writer, playwright, politician and political writer

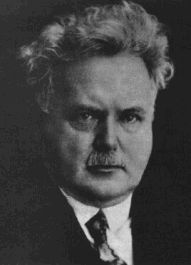
- Photograph of Dyk, circa 1917
- Born: 31 December 1877; Pšovka u Mělníka, Kingdom of Bohemia, Austria-Hungary
- Died: 14 May 1931 (aged 53); Lopud, Yugoslavia
- Occupations: Poet, politician, playwright, prose writer, journalist
- Writing career
- Movement: Czech nationalist

Viktor Dyk (Czech pronunciation: [ˈvɪktor ˈdɪk]; 31 December 1877 – 14 May 1931) was a nationalist Czech poet, prose writer, playwright, politician and political writer. He was sent to jail during the First World War for opposing the Austro-Hungarian empire. He was one of the signatories of the Manifesto of Czech writers. Dyk co-founded a political party and entered politics. He died at age 53, leaving his many poems, plays and writings.

== Life ==
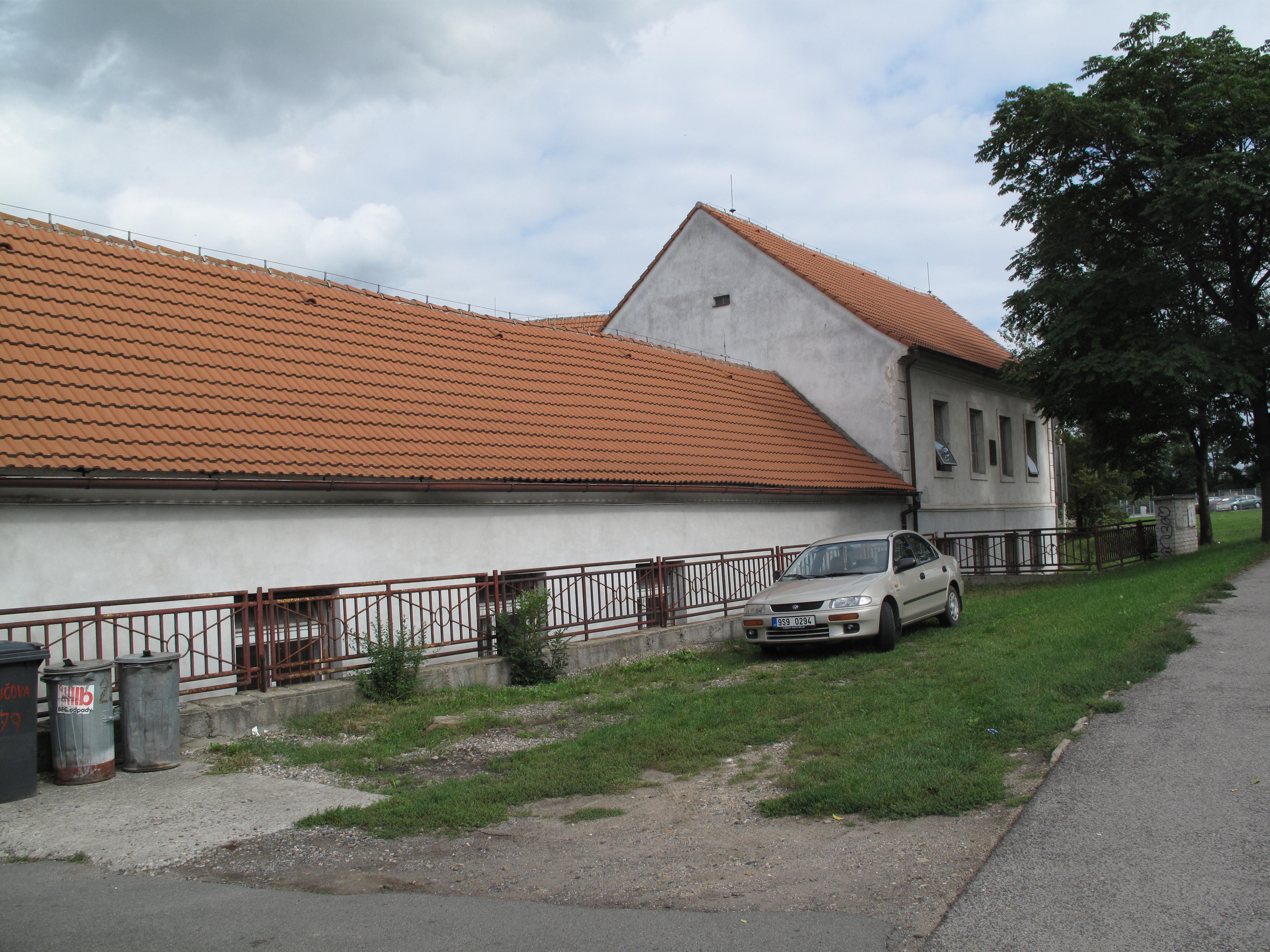
Viktor Dyk's birthplace

Dyk was born in Pšovka u Mělníka in the Kingdom of Bohemia in 1877. His family moved to Prague in 1888 where he began to write. His family settled in the Prague suburb of Vinohrady in 1904 and that year he published a novel titled The End of Hackenschmid which was anti-Austrian. Dyk had taken part in the Czech Chess Championship the year before and he was to remain interested in the game for at least the next twenty years. He was most active in 1913 and seven of his games between 1903 and 1927 are recorded but, of these, only one is a victory.

Viktor Dyk studied at a gymnasium in Prague (one of his teachers was Alois Jirásek). Dyk completed his education at Charles University in Prague where he achieved a law degree. Later, law and politics were to dominate his life.

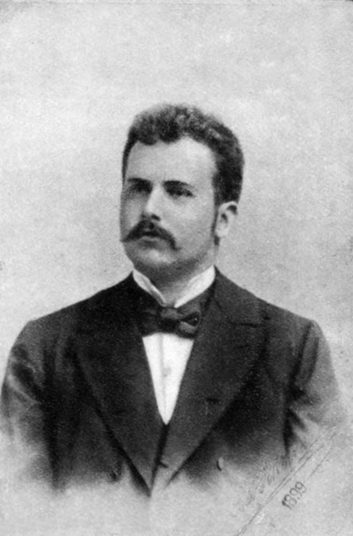
Photo taken in 1899, aged 22

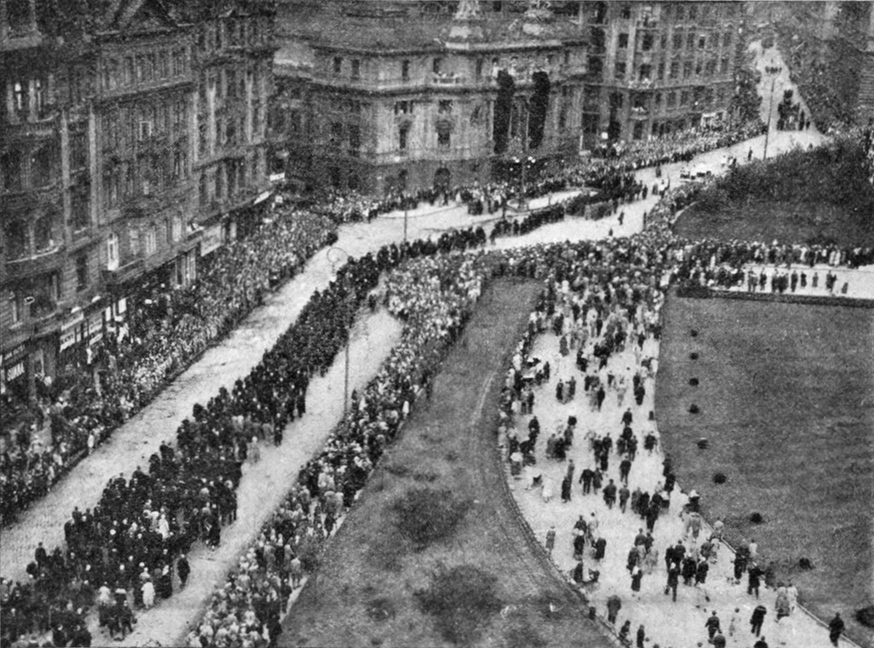
Funeral procession, 1931

In 1911, he became involved in politics and joined the Czech Constitutionalist Progressive Party (Státoprávně pokroková strana). He stood for office in the 1911 elections, but received just 205 votes in Vinohrady and placed fourth overall of five candidates.

Dyk together with Franz Kafka spoke of a "Great Wall" which, like the Great Wall of China or the Tower of Babel, became a metaphor for the cultural and linguistic division that they believed was required between Czech and Germanic culture. Dyk wrote in the magazine Lumír, where he was known to state that Bohemia had to become Czech or they should die in the attempt. On April 13, 1913, he composed a tirade in reply to an article published by Franz Werfel. Dyk stated that his group had not built the "Great Wall" as they were not opposed per se to German ideas, however they did see the dangers. Dyk saw no problem with communicating with Germans but he warned against "surrender" to ensure that they did not become "Czech-speaking Germans".

During the First World War, he continued to write, and he became involved in helping write a libretto for an opera by Leoš Janáček. Janáček's fifth opera, The Excursions of Mr. Brouček to the Moon and to the 15th Century went through a number of librettists and Dyk worked on Janáček's opera which was based on a story by Svatopluk Čech. In 1915 he started working with Vinohrady Theatre. Later he was imprisoned in Vienna for his resistance activities against Austria-Hungary. He was in jail in 1916 and 1917 for suggesting that Moravia and Bohemia could secede from the empire. In May 1917 Dyk was one of the signatories of the Manifesto of Czech writers. This was an important document created by Jaroslav Kvapil who was the director of the Czech National Theatre. Kvapil managed to get 200 writers to sign the manifesto, and it was designed to encourage the Czech deputies to the Imperial Council in Vienna to support Czech self-determination. In 1918, he co-founded the Czechoslovak National Democratic Party (Czech: Československá národní demokracie).

His writings were designed to inspire nationalism in the fight to reclaim the Kingdom of Bohemia from Austrian rule. In 1907 he became the editor of the magazine Lumír. He was to lead this magazine for the rest of his life. The magazine's followers were known by the same name as the magazine. The writers and artists involved started a new direction in Czech culture. Previously, the culture was seen as coming from Germans and sources in German. For instance, German poets like Heinrich Heine had poems translated from German to Czech. With the emergence of the Lumír group writers like Vrchlický, Dyk himself, and Julius Zeyer the focus turned away from German culture. This change of focus is said to have led other Czech intellectuals to also look in this new direction for scientific, economic and social ideas.

His political views were conservative and nationalist and in 1920 he was elected to parliament. In the times of the First Republic of Czechoslovakia, Viktor Dyk was one of the prominent intellectual opponents of President Tomáš Garrigue Masaryk. In 1928 he married the writer Zdenka Hásková. In the 1929 parliamentary election, Dyk became a senator of Czechoslovakia, representing the Czechoslovak Democratic Party.

Viktor Dyk died of heart failure on 14 May 1931 while swimming in the sea near the island of Lopud, near Dubrovnik in Croatia. He was replaced as senator by Jan Kapras. Dyk's funeral attracted many mourners. He was buried at Olšany Cemetery in Prague.

== Legacy ==
Dyk has a number of monuments, including one in Vinohrady, where he lived most of his life. Jiří Jílek created a life-sized bronze bust on a granite plinth in his birthplace of Mělník in the Bohemian area of the Czech Republic. The statue is on the street Vilohrady Karla IV by the Štefánik observation point. The statue does not mention his career or life span but merely says "Viktor Dyk".

There is also a monument to Dyk on the Island of Lopud created by Nikola Dobrović in 1936. The concrete monument is on hill where three paths meet and it was paid for by the former government of Czechoslovakia.

Dyk's book Krysař (English: Rat-catcher) was the basis for a 2003 film of the same name by director F.A. Brabec. The film was shot in under 24 hours, leading to producers of the film claiming it to be a world record for the fastest-ever film shooting. The same book was also used by Jiří Barta in creating the base story for his 1986 animation The Pied Piper. Barta notes that it is Dyk's book which is the basis of the average Czech's understanding of the Pied Piper story.

Czech President Václav Klaus cited one of Dyk's poems in his 2011 New Year's address to the nation, urging Czech citizens not to emigrate. Klaus's speech was directed at the Czechs who were finding the fiscal restrictions of the economy difficult to bear. Klaus appealed to nationalists with Dyk's suggestion of what the nation would think: "I will survive if you leave me – but without me you will surely die."

== Works ==
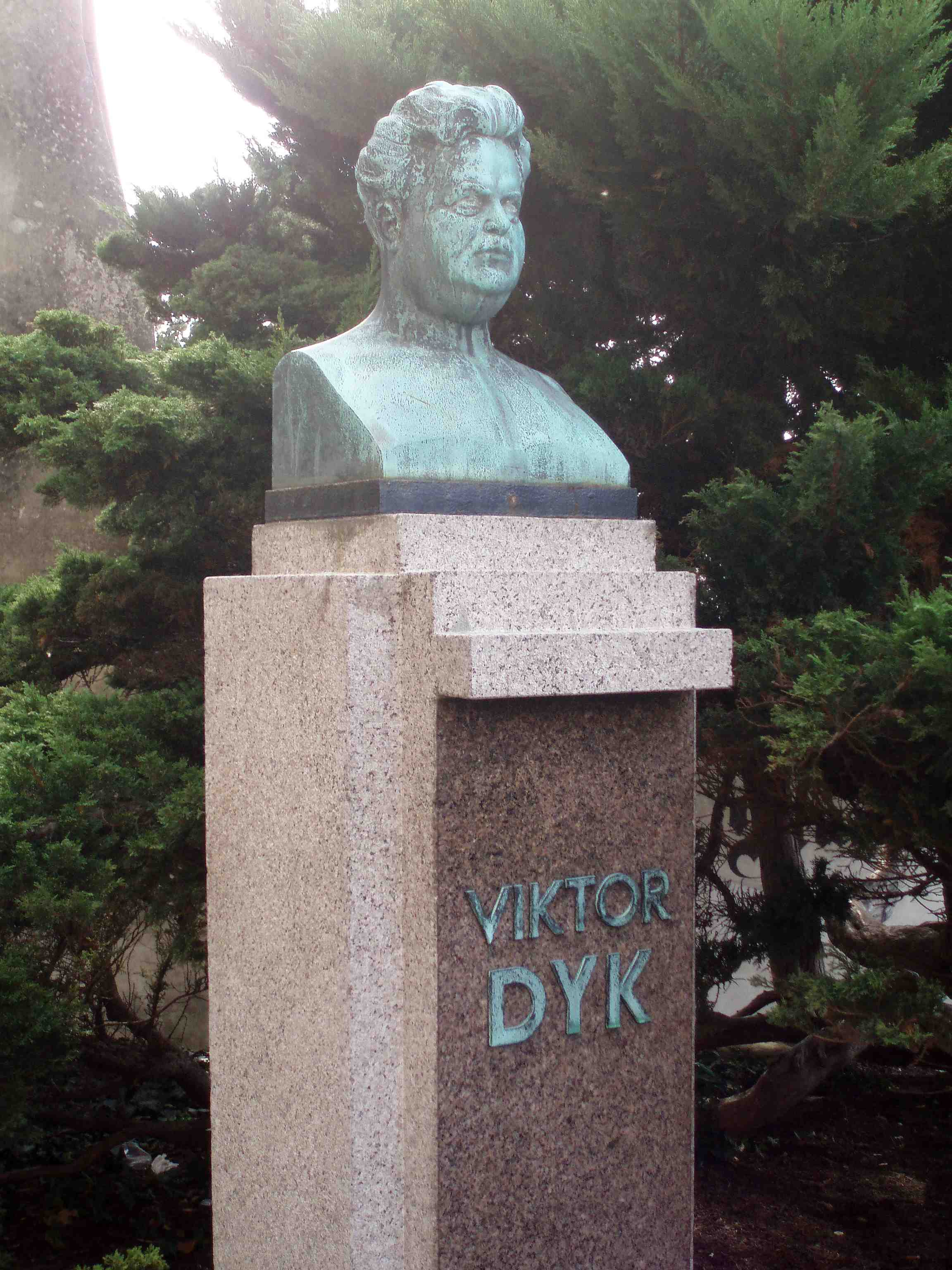
Monument to Viktor Dyk in Mělník

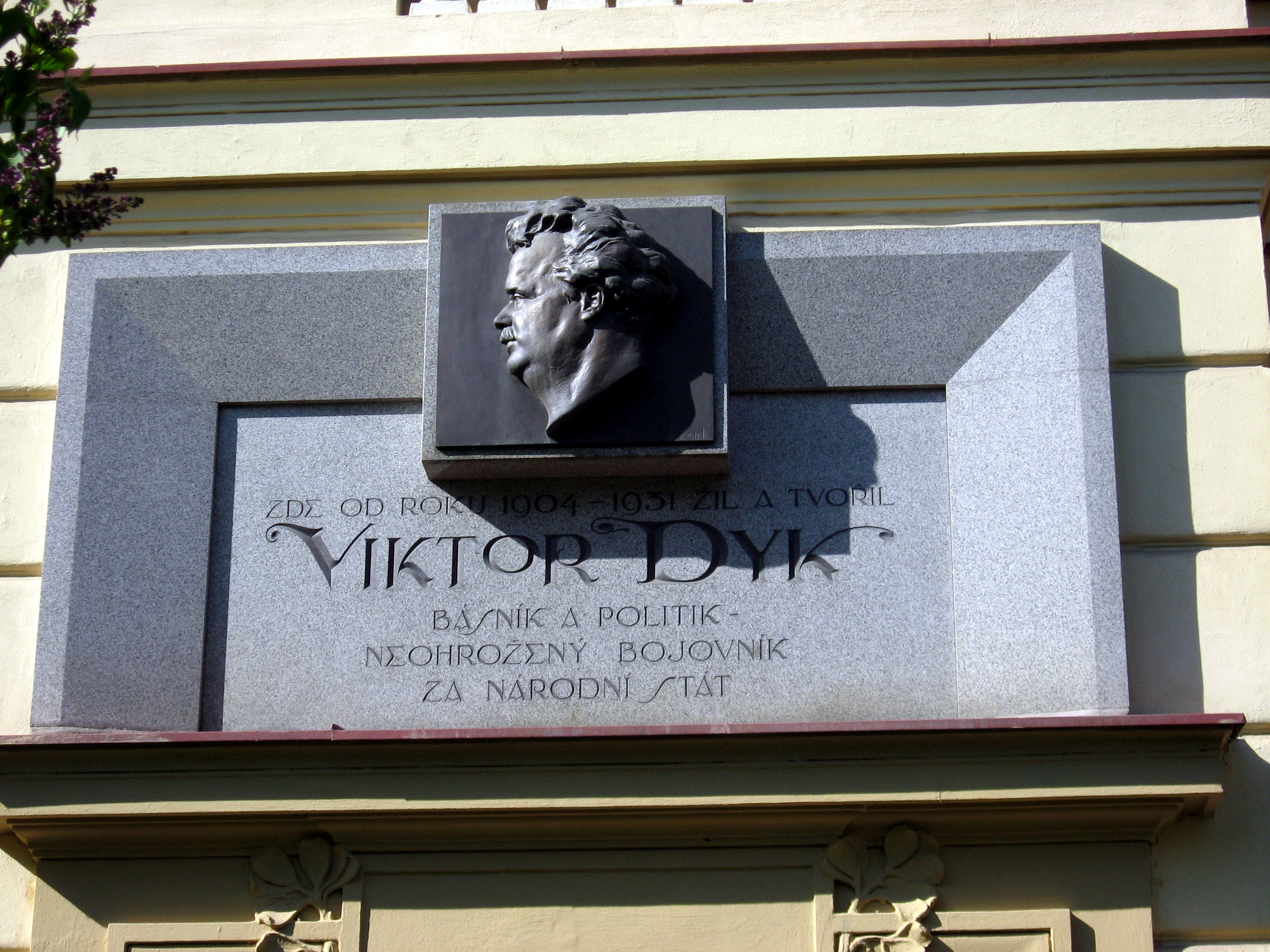
Memorial plaque, Vinohrady

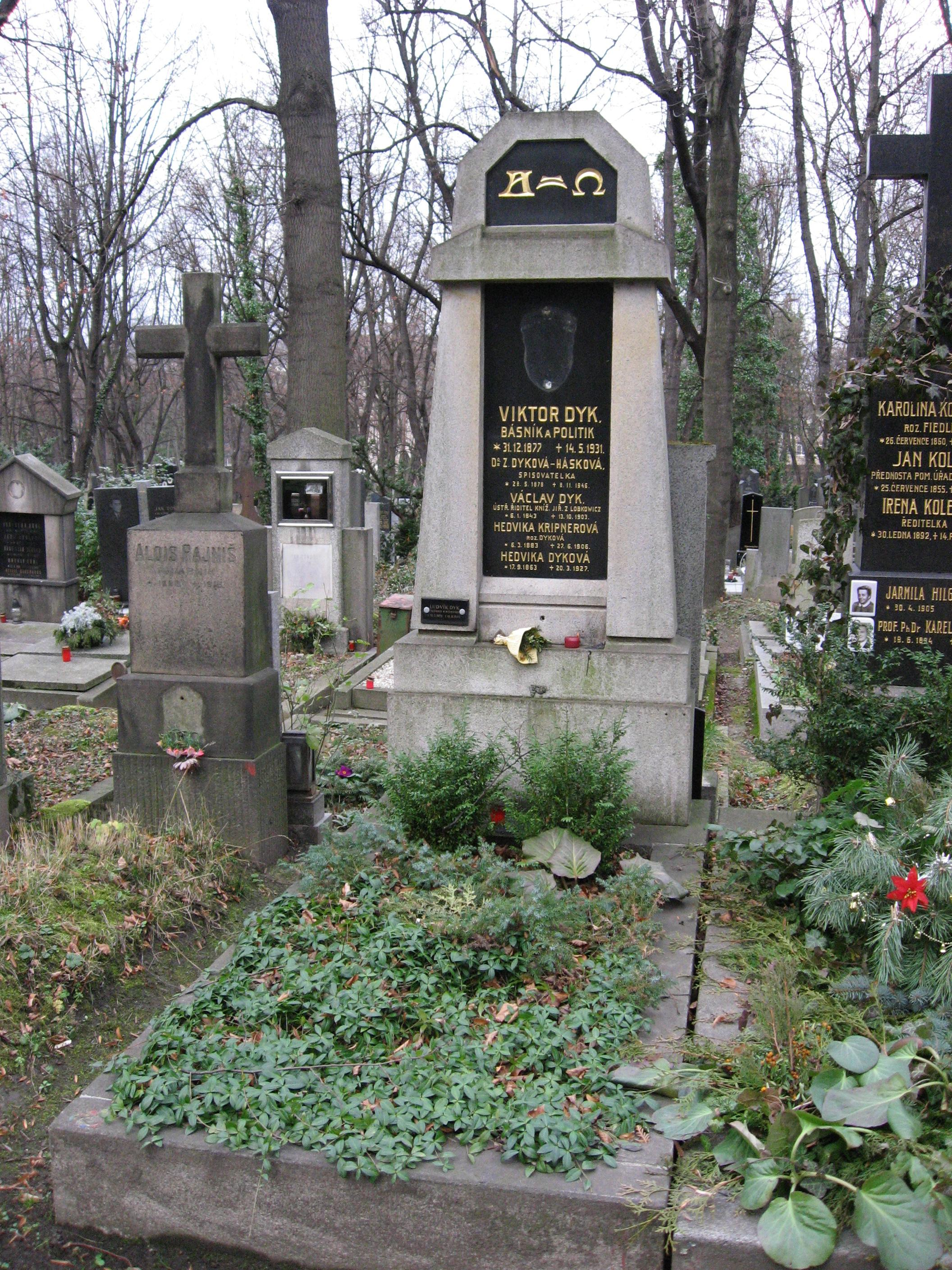
Grave of Viktor Dyk at the Olšanské hřbitovy

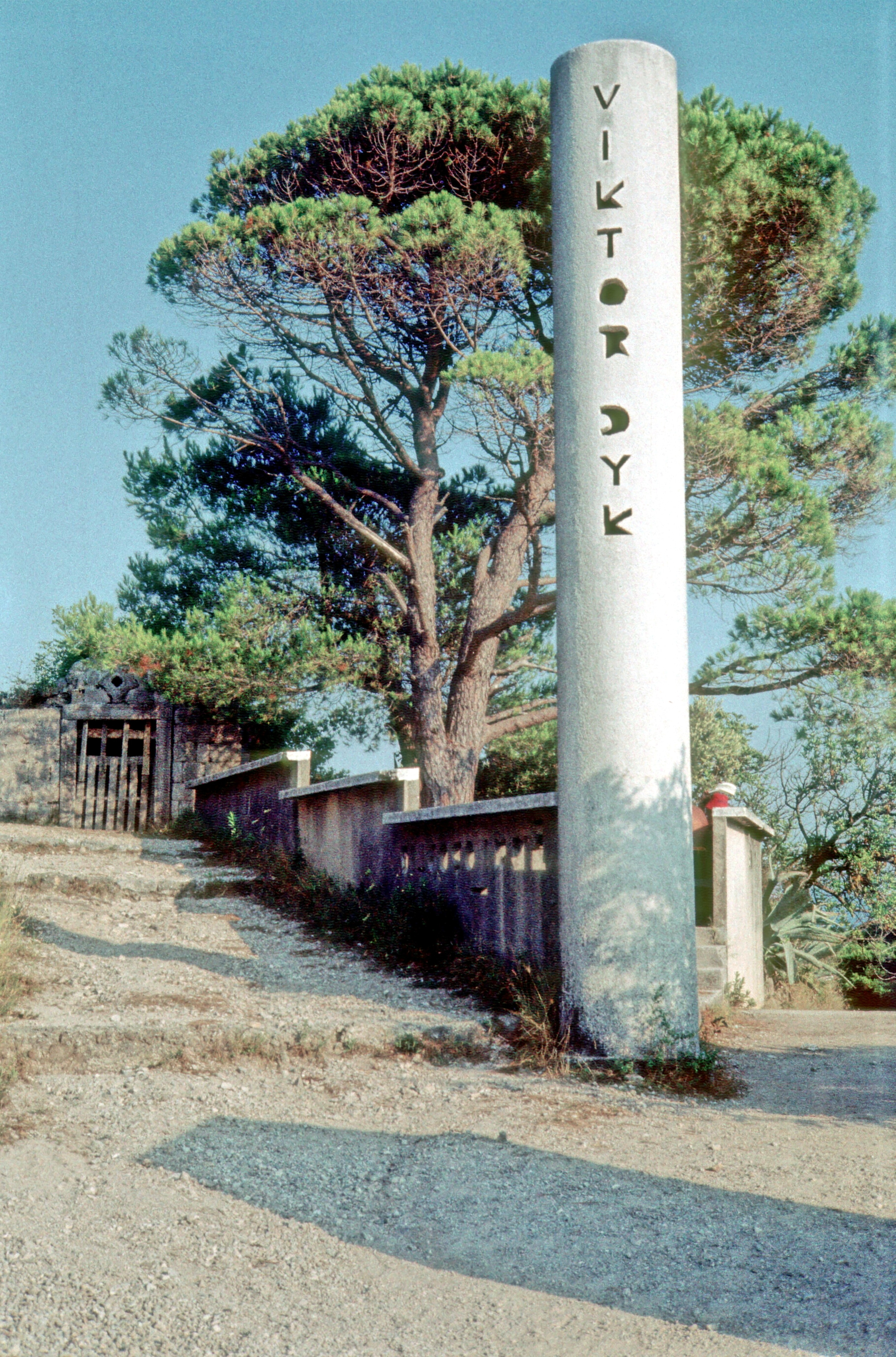
Memorial of Viktor Dyk at the island of Lopud where he drowned – photo from 1981 before renovation

=== Poetry ===
- A porta inferi, 1897
- Síla života, 1898
- Marnosti, 1900
- Satiry a sarkasmy, 1905
- Milá sedmi loupežníků, 1906
- Pohádky z naší vesnice, 1910
- Giuseppe Moro, 1911
- Zápas Jiřího Macků, 1916
- Noci chiméry, 1917
- Devátá vlna 1930
- Lehké a těžké kroky 1915
- Anebo 1917
- Okno 1921
- Poslední rok 1922

=== Prose ===
- Stud, 1900
- Hučí jez a jiné prózy, 1903
- Konec Hackenschmidův, (The End of Hackenschmid) 1904
- Prosinec, 1906
- Prsty Habakukovy, 1906
- Píseň o vrbě, 1908
- Příhody, 1911
- Krysař, 1915, English edition The Pied Piper, Karolinum Press 2018, ISBN 978-80-246-3440-1.
- Tajemná dobrodružství Alexeje Iványče Kozulinova, 1923
- Tichý dům, 1921
- Zlý vítr, 1922
- Prsty Habakukovy, 1925
- Můj přítel Čehona, 1925
- Dědivadelní hra, 1927
- Holoubek Kuzma, 1928
- Soykovy děti, 1929

=== Political literature ===
- Ad usum pana presidenta republiky (1929 – criticism of Edvard Beneš and Tomáš Garrigue Masaryk
- O národní stát (posthumously 1932–1938, 7 books of Dyk's political writing from 1917 to 1931)

=== Plays ===
- Epizoda, 1906
- Posel, 1907
- Zmoudření Dona Quijota, 1913
- Veliký mág, 1914
- Zvěrstva, 1919
- Ondřej a drak, 1919
- Revoluční trilogie, 1921
- Napravený plukovník Švec, 1929 – support of Rudolf Medek

=== Memoirs ===
- Vzpomínky a komentáře, 1927

=== Opera libretto ===
- Partially wrote libretto of The Excursions of Mr. Brouček to the Moon and to the 15th Century

== See also ==
- List of Czech writers
