= Hradištko (Prague-West District) =

- Municipality
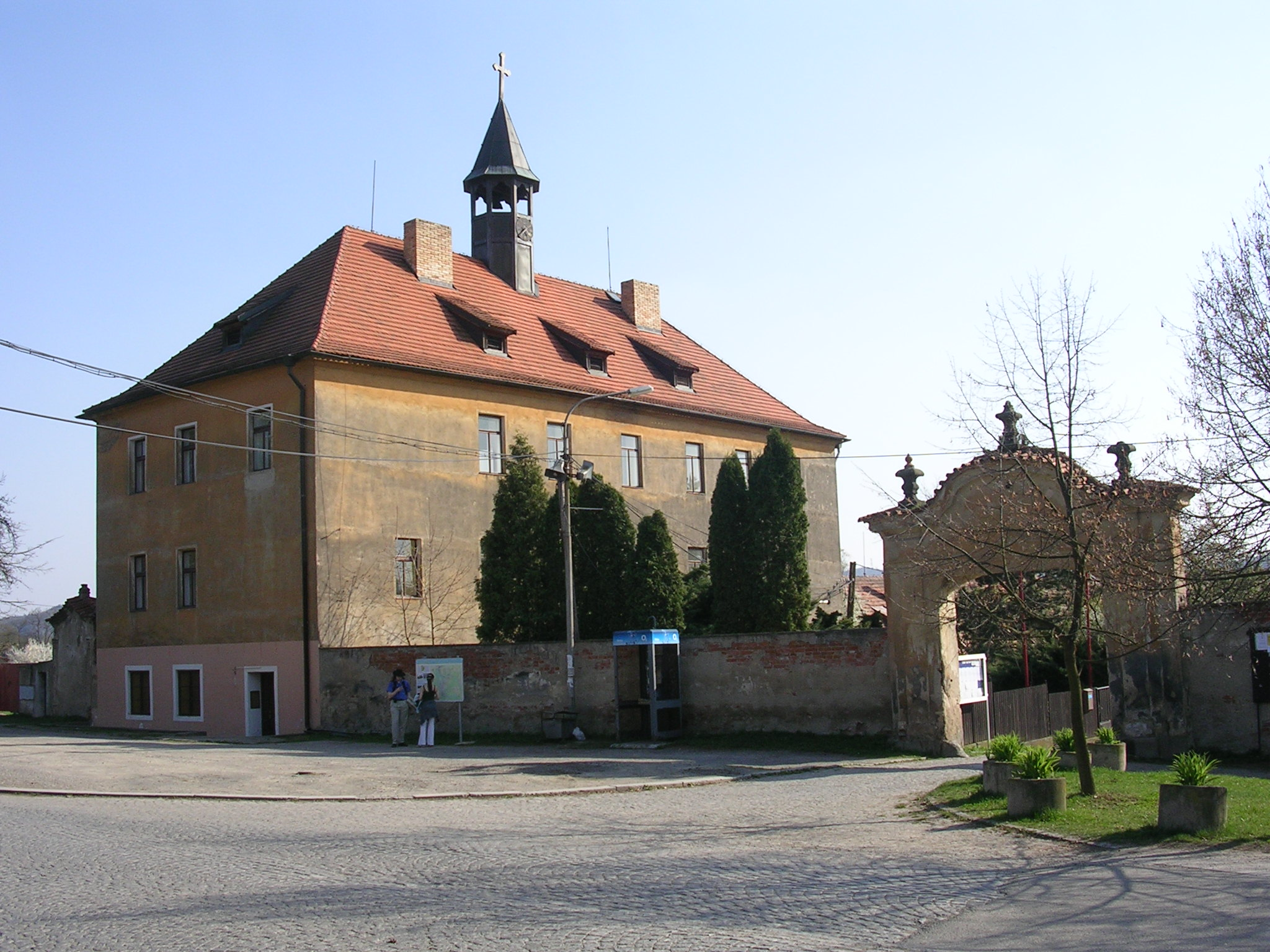
- Hradištko Castle

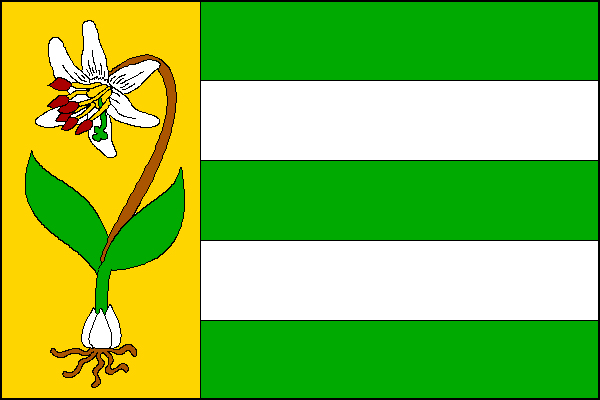
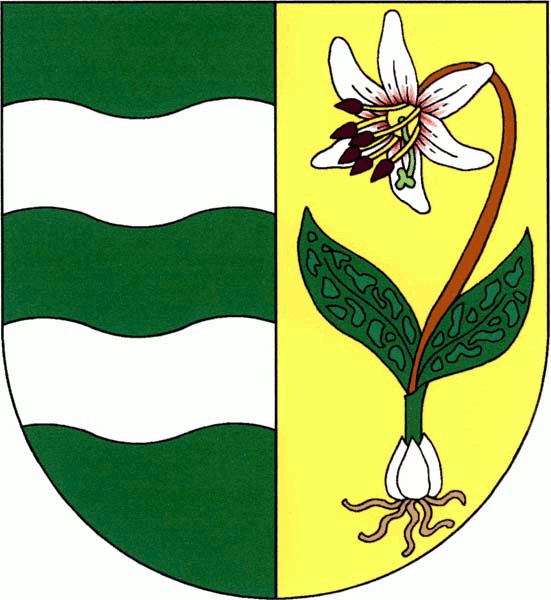
- Flag Coat of arms

- Location in the Czech Republic
- Coordinates: 49°52′6″N 14°24′34″E
- Country: Czech Republic
- Region: Central Bohemian
- District: Prague-West
- First mentioned: 1310

Area
  - Total: 11.88 km^{2} (4.59 sq mi)
- Elevation: 285 m (935 ft)

Population (2026-01-01)
  - Total: 2,543
  - Density: 214.1/km^{2} (554.4/sq mi)
- Time zone: UTC+1 (CET)
  - Summer (DST): UTC+2 (CEST)
- Postal code: 252 09
- Website: www.hradistko.cz

Hradištko is a municipality and village in Prague-West District in the Central Bohemian Region of the Czech Republic. It has about 2,500 inhabitants.

== Administrative division ==
Hradištko consists of four municipal parts (in brackets population according to the 2021 census):

- Hradištko (1,387)
- Brunšov (371)
- Pikovice (443)
- Rajchardov (280)

== Etymology ==
The initial name of Hradištko was Hradiště. The Czech word hradiště means 'gord', but formerly it denoted any place where a castle (Czech: hrad) stood. Since the mid-17th century, the name Hradištko (a diminutive of hradiště) has been used. The name was also alternatively written as Hradišťko.

== Geography ==
Hradištko is located about 16 kilometres (10 mi) south of Prague. It lies in the Benešov Uplands. The highest point is at 440 m (1,444 ft) above sea level. The municipality is situated at the confluence of the Vltava and Sázava rivers. The Štěchovice Reservoir, built on the Vltava, lies on the southern municipal border.

== History ==
The first written mention of Hradištko is in a papal bull of Pope Clement V from 1310. The owners of the village often changed until 1636, when Hradištko was purchased by the Strahov Monastery.

== Demographics ==
Historical population

Year	Pop.	±%
1869	622	—
1880	638	+2.6%
1890	663	+3.9%
1900	625	−5.7%
1910	563	−9.9%

Year	Pop.	±%
1921	580	+3.0%
1930	631	+8.8%
1950	994	+57.5%
1961	1,192	+19.9%
1970	1,188	−0.3%

Year	Pop.	±%
1980	1,230	+3.5%
1991	1,141	−7.2%
2001	1,261	+10.5%
2011	1,859	+47.4%
2021	2,481	+33.5%

Source: Censuses

== Transport ==
There are no railways or major roads passing through the municipality.

== Sights ==
The main landmark is the Hradištko Castle. There was a fortress from 1571, which was rebuilt into the current simple Baroque castle in 1709. Today the building houses the municipal office and a library.

== Notable people ==
- Zdenka Hásková (1878–1946), journalist, writer and translator
- Magda Sonja (1886–1974), Austrian-American actress

== Twin towns – sister cities ==
Hradištko is twinned with:

- Essen, Belgium
