= Emanuel Krescenc Liška =

Czech painter (1852–1903)

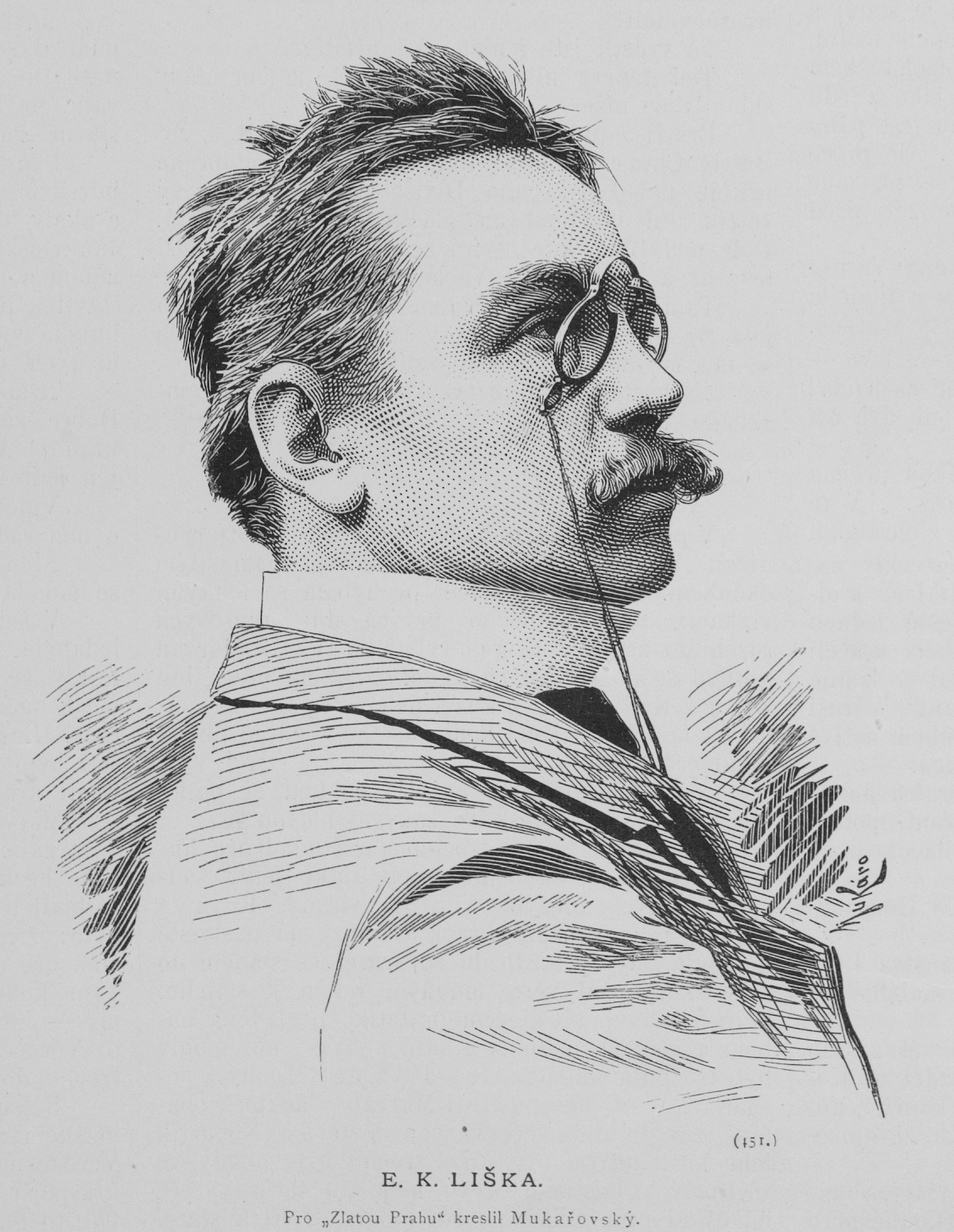
Emanuel Krescenc Liška; drawing by Josef Mukařovský (1884)

Emanuel Krescenc Liška (19 April 1852 – 18 January 1903) was a Czech painter and illustrator. Most of his works were on religious themes, but he also created scenes from works of poetry.

== Biography ==
Liška was born on 19 April 1852 in Mikulovice. Not long after he was born, the family moved to Milevsko, where his father had found work as a farm manager. Their stay was short, however, as his father soon died and his mother took him to Prague. When he was nine, his mother also died, leaving him almost nothing.

As soon as he was old enough, he began taking art lessons, but had to support himself by tutoring and working as an assistant at the local gymnasium. He achieved second place in a contest to create designs for the hall of the National Theatre, then was awarded a contract by the city government to copy the designs on the calendar dial of the Prague astronomical clock.

In 1879, he and Jakub Schikaneder were chosen to decorate the Royal Box at the National Theatre, but their work was destroyed by fire only two years later. Liška used his commission to attend classes with Otto Seitz at the Academy of Fine Arts, Munich. A mural of the Crucifixion in the chapel at the Klar Institute (a charity for the blind) resulted in a grant that enabled him to spend two years in Italy. The works he created there were shown at the General Land Centennial Exhibition (1891). Despite these successes, his oil paintings never sold well.

From 1888, he served as a professor at the Academy of Arts, Architecture and Design. He died in Prague suddenly on 18 January 1903, of a stroke. A memorial poem in his honor was written by Bohdan Kaminský.

== Selected paintings ==
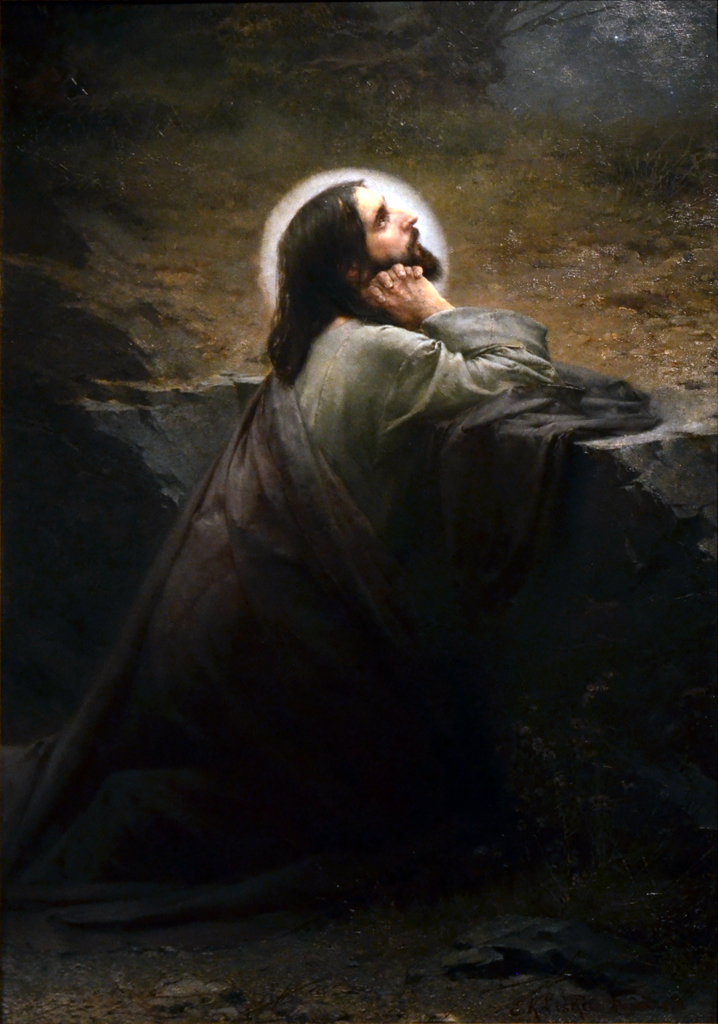
Christ on the Mount of Olives

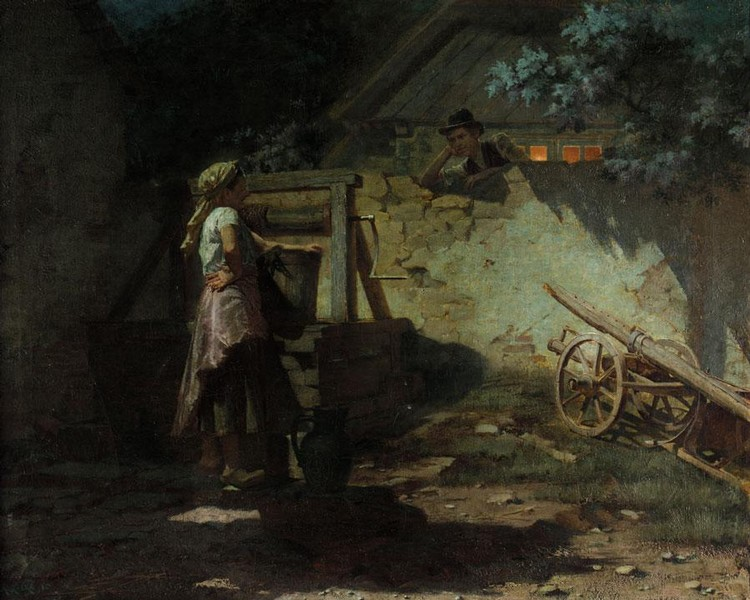
Village Courtship

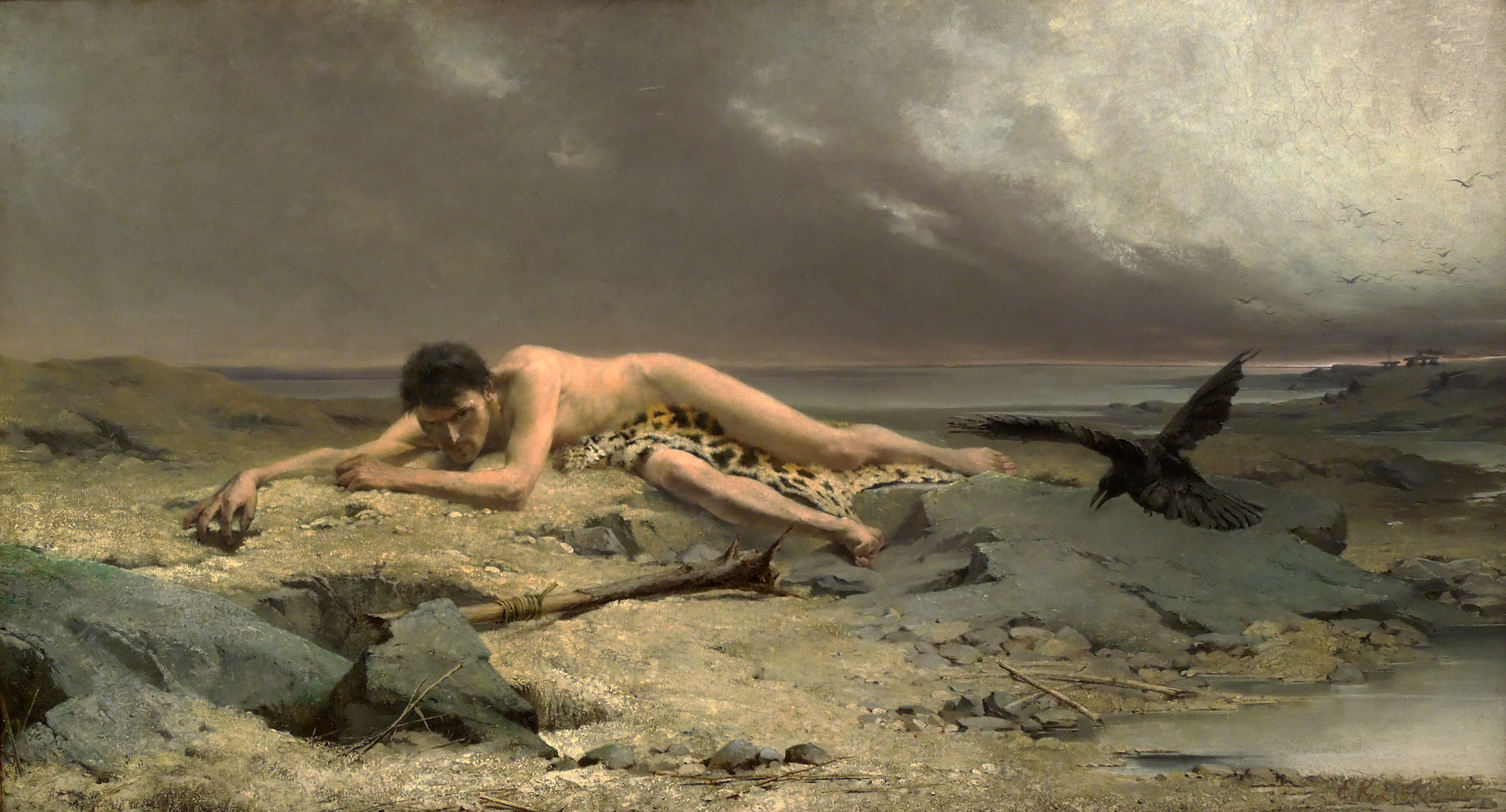
Cain

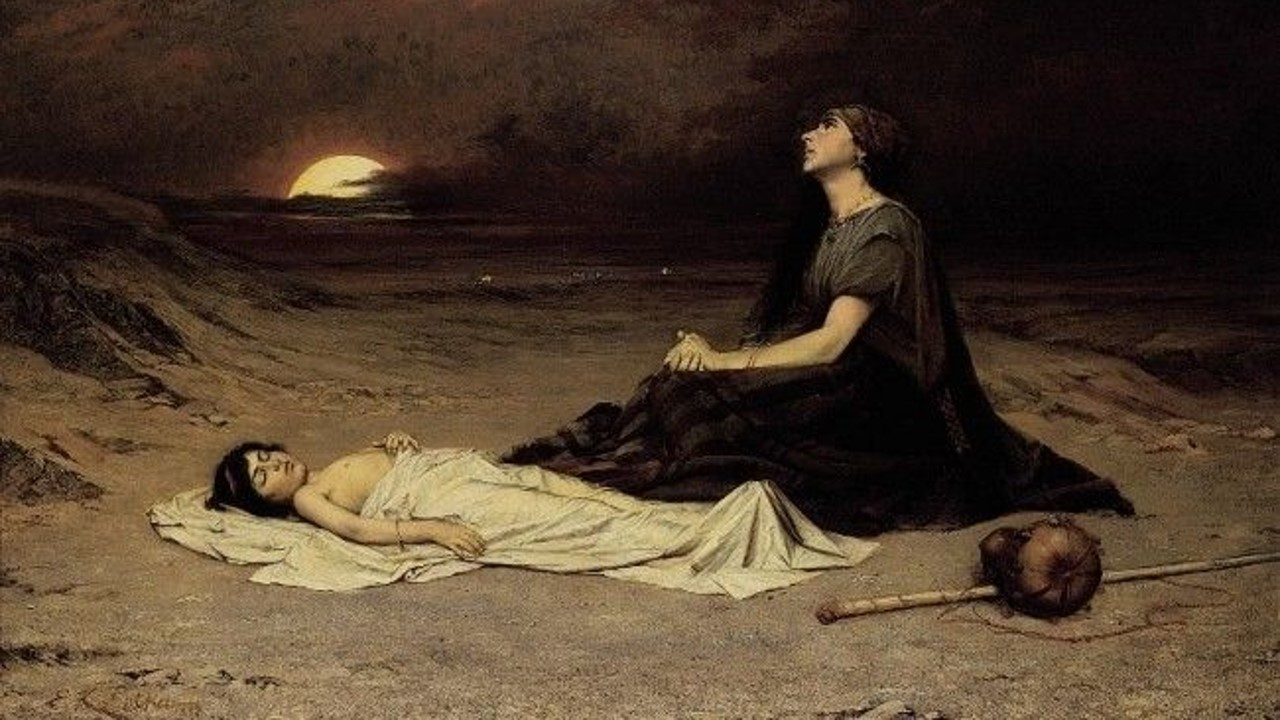
Hagar and Ishmael in the Desert
