= Jakub Schikaneder =

Czech painter (1855–1924)

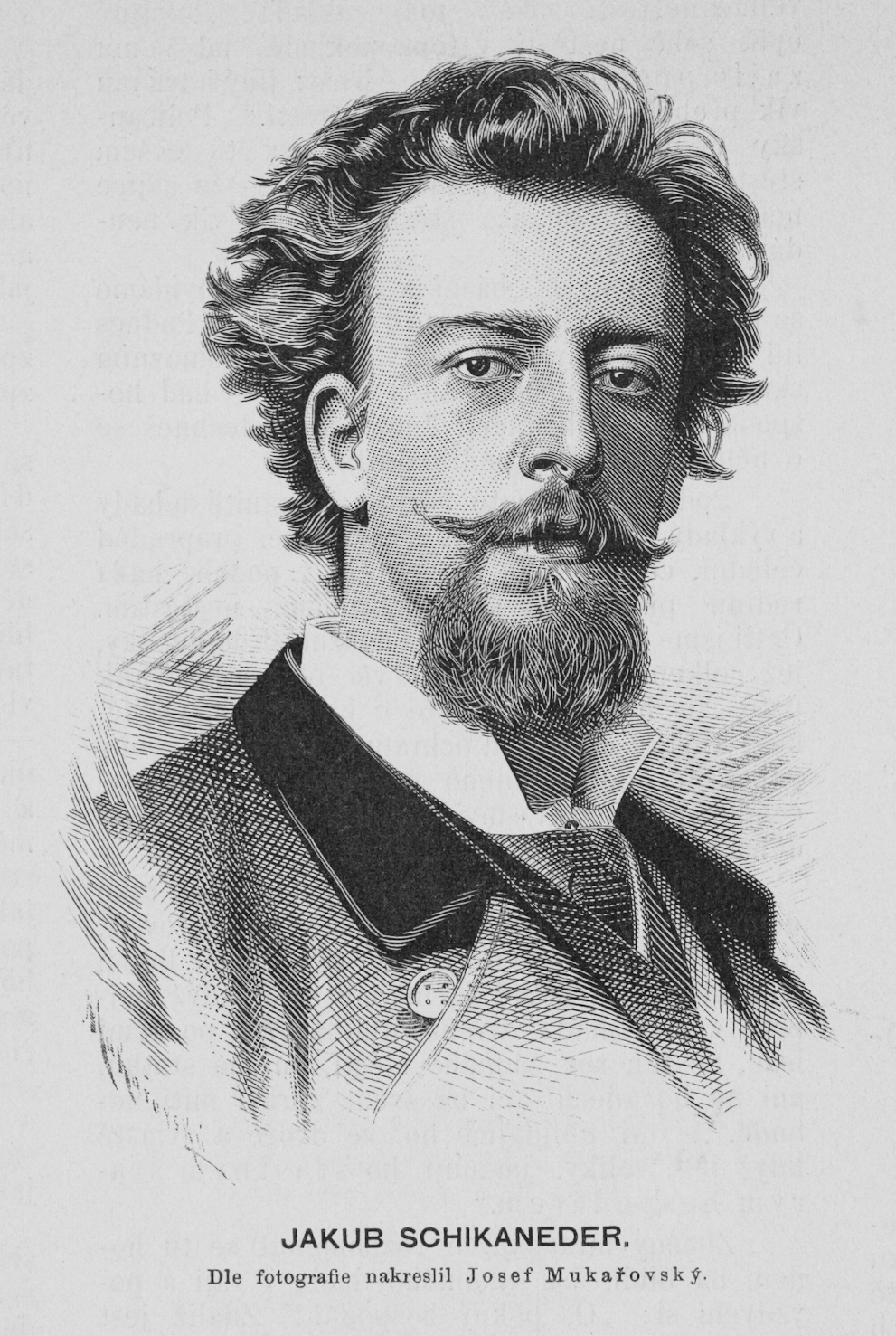
- Engraving of Schikaneder by Josef Mukařovský (1887)
- Born: 27 February 1855; Prague, Bohemia, Austrian Empire
- Died: 15 November 1924 (aged 69); Prague, Czechoslovakia
- Education: Prague Academy of Fine Arts, The Academy in Munich, Gabriel Von Max
- Known for: painting
- Notable work: Murder in the Block (1887–1890), Drowned (1893), Early Evening at Hradčany (1909)
- Style: Bohemian
- Movement: Romanticism, Realism, Symbolism

Jakub Schikaneder (27 February 1855 – 15 November 1924) was a Czech (Note: Schikaneder was a citizen of the Austrian Empire from 1855 to 1867, Austria-Hungary from 1867 to 1918 and then Czechoslovakia from 1918 to 1924. He was lifelong resident of the Kingdom of Bohemia and his mother was Czech.) painter and art professor. His work is known for its atmospheric, soft, and sorrowful genre scenes. The melancholy and moody themes of Schikaneder's pieces bear resemblance to the artistic trends of Romanticism, Realism, and Symbolism. Gabriel von Max, a Prague artist and professor of history painting, was a mentor and teacher for Schikaneder. Schikaneder notably participated in the decorating of the National Theatre in Prague in 1881. Much of Schikaneder's work has since been lost, and the artist passed largely unknown to Czech society until the rediscovery of his work in 1998.

== Biography ==
=== Early life ===
Jakub (or Jakob) Schikaneder was born on 27 February 1855 in Prague, Bohemia, in the Austrian Empire to an Austrian father and a Czech mother. His father, Karel Friedrich Schikaneder, was from Vienna and worked as a customs office clerk in Prague. His mother Leokadia (née Běhavá) was a native of Prague. He was a paternal descendant of Urban Schikaneder, the elder brother of librettist Emanuel Schikaneder.

=== Emerging artist ===
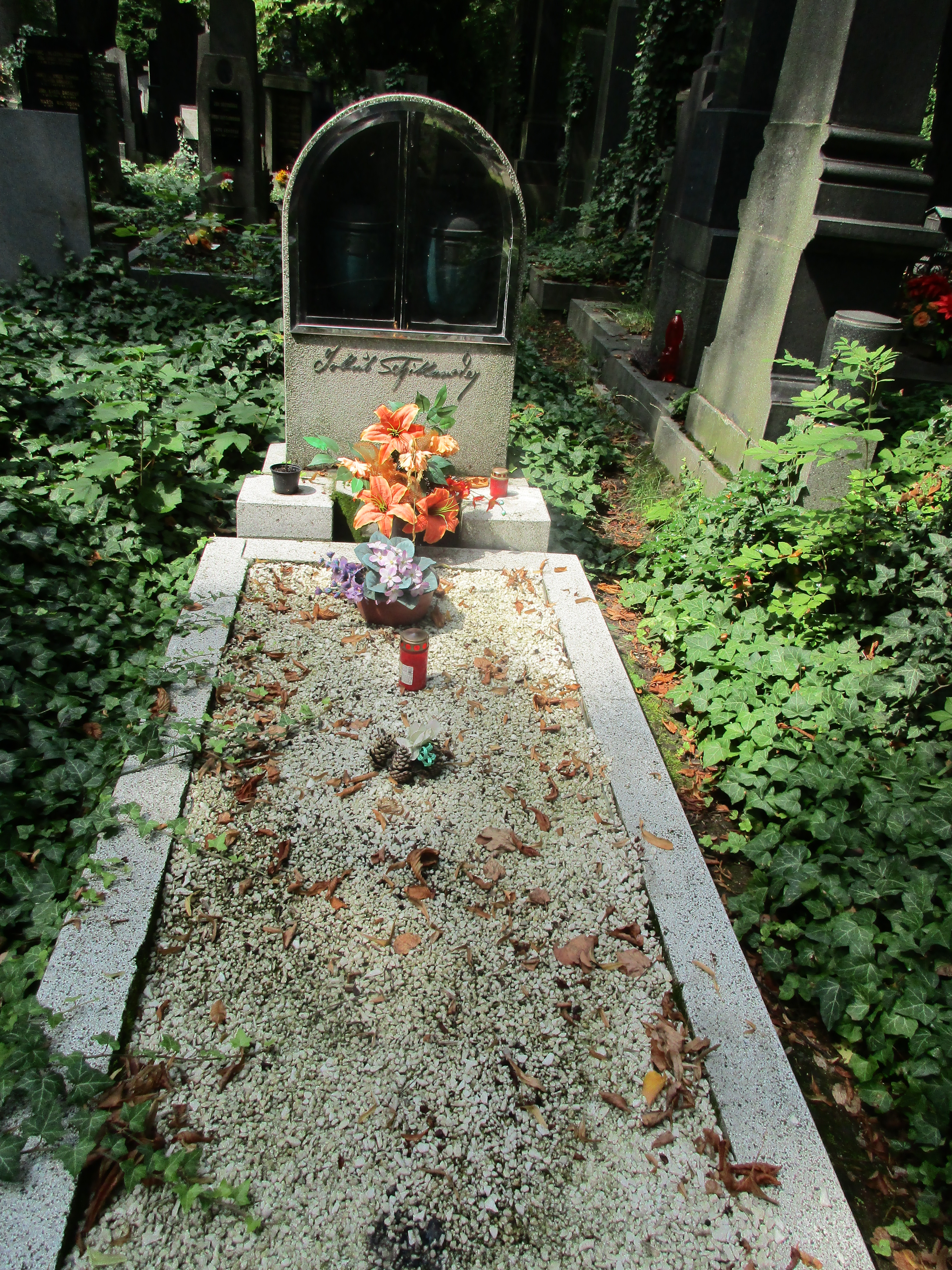
Grave of Schnikaneder at the Vinohrady Cemetery

The Schikaneder family's love of art and their middle-class status in Prague society enabled him to pursue his studies at the Academy of Fine Arts from the age of 15. From 1870 to 1878, Schikaneder was immersed in the academy's stereometric and classical art style. He was a student of Antonín Lhota at the academy and finished his studies in 1878, serving for a year in the Austro-Hungarian Army. He travelled to and stayed in Paris from 1878 to 1880, where he gleaned inspiration from the late-nineteenth-century Parisian art scene before continuing his studies at the academy in Munich under Czech painter Gabriel von Max. Max's teaching allowed Schikaneder to explore deeper spiritual themes and examine the social contradictions in Czech art and culture of the time. He counted amongst those who admired the Munich School of the end of the 19th century. Schikaneder first attempted to publicly exhibit his work in 1879 at the Žofín salon, where he applied concepts of genre painting rather than the classic form taught by the Academy of Fine Arts. Schikaneder returned to Prague and participated in the painting of the National Theatre in Prague. From 1868 to 1881, this decorating brought together many artists and represented a national revival of Czech culture. Co-working with Emanuel Krescenc Liška, the two artists' proposal for the decoration of the Royal Box was accepted, a design that illustrated three important periods of Czech history upon a frieze. Schikaneder's work, however, did not grant him much fame or success, and it was later replaced with another design after the Theatre was destroyed by a fire disaster in 1881. Following his work in the National Theatre, he traveled through Europe, visiting Germany, England, Scotland, the Netherlands, Switzerland, Italy and France.

On 5 July 1884, Schikaneder married Emília Nevolová, daughter of a railway official. They lived in Královské Vinohrady (today Vinohrady, a district of Prague) and had one child who died in infancy. Around this time, Schikaneder became an assistant in the studio of František Ženíšek at the Academy of Arts. The following year, Schikaneder began teaching at the School of Decorative Art in Prague, becoming a professor in the studio of decorative painting. In 1913, he was elected a full member of the Academy of Sciences and Arts. Following his retirement from teaching in 1922, Schikaneder repeatedly visited the island of Heligoland in Germany and the North Sea.

Schikaneder died on 15 November 1924 in Prague and was buried at Vinohrady Cemetery.

== Style ==
Schikaneder is known for his soft paintings of the outdoors, often lonely and melancholic. Paul Signac defines Schikaneder's intention behind his work as striving for a “unifying and moral harmony." Inspired by a Neo-Impressionist approach, Schikaneder's artistic technique consists of small brushstrokes that effectively infuse effects of gleam, mist, and blurriness. His paintings often feature poor and outcast figures and "combined neo-romantic and naturalist impulses." Schikaneder takes a particular interest in depicting shadow–both indoors and outdoors–that draws parallels to the nostalgic atmosphere of fin-de-siècle Symbolism. Other motifs favoured by Schikaneder were autumn and winter, corners and alleyways in the city of Prague and the banks of the Vltava – often in the early evening light, or cloaked in mist. Painting the Czech cultural atmosphere provided Schikaneder an opportunity to respond to the political and cultural dilemmas of the time, as well as the confrontation between the individual and society. Schikaneder also recurrently depicted the lifeless bodies of women, following the current times’ themes of ruin and despair. He draws inspiration from Parisian culture for depicting women, 19th-century European painting for themes of nostalgia and despair, and baroque Dutch painting–especially that of Rembrandt–for depicting light and aestheticism.

In the beginning of his career, Schikaneder's work consisted of social subjects–including things like a country woman gathering wood and various death ceremonies–painted in an academic technique suitable for the realist trend of the 19th century. During this time, his works consist of mediums of oil paint, linear drawing, and the rich use of paint that conveys realistic and direct expression. His work done in the 1880s combines pale and sombre colors in rural and urban settings, creating a melancholy atmosphere, as seen in pieces like Winter (1884) and On All Souls’ Day (1888). Schikaneder also depicted varying themes of power in his work, like women and children and the fight for property and power. His paintings, as seen in pieces like Murder in the Block (1887-1890), gradually starts to convey a mental reaction to social reality, combining both local and foreign influences into his work.

During the 1890s, Schikander dedicated his work to portraying everyday emotional relationships and intellectual reactions to the crisis of modern existence. His propensity to paint surface reality and isolated figures in the 1880s shifted to portraying hidden meaning and combinations of light and color. Schikander, in particular, explored themes of death, both directly and suggestingly, and began to change to pastels and charcoals to employ a more subtle and firm style. Schikaneder drew inspiration from figures like Arthur Schopenhauer and his philosophy at this time.

Nearing the end of his career, Schikaneder painted scenes of sentimental interiors, like his Woman at a Window (1900). His nocturnal and twilight urban scenes were also especially notable at this time. Following the end of WWI, experiencing a lightness and ease, Schikaneder paints and captures his cheerful character without anxious restrictions through different landscape and marine scene. His work done in his closing years captures a poetic longing, expressed lightly and clearly yet bracing in mood.

== Notable works ==
Schikaneder's first well-known work was the monumental painting Repentance of the Lollards (2.5m × 4m) which has since been lost. Inspired by teacher Garbiel von Max, Schikaneder's famous Murder in the Block (1887–90) represents an attempt to expand the political and emotional range of genre painting.Drowned (1893) depicts a similar recurrent theme of dead women, illustrating a drowned female body lying in the same fashion–though inverted–as the murdered woman. Schikaneder gave poet Jaroslav Vrchlicky a sketch of Drowned in 1893. Another of Schikaneder's notable works, painted in 1910, is Evening Mood. The painting's haziness represents an existential filter on one's perception of place; its hazy glow symbolically stops sunset's fading time into a lasting present. Another notable landscape of Schikaneder is Early Evening at Hradčany (1909), depicting a winter dusk and the back of a lone woman leaning over the wally of a bridge. Schikaneder's mysterious and melancholic mood were often infused by the paintings of a lone figure seen from behind.

== Legacy ==
Schikaneder is known for his moody, twilight urban scenes. His work has been mostly lost since he first started his artistic career. Due to the popularity of Cubist and Surrealist art within Czech culture during much of the 20th century, Schikaneder passed mainly unknown to the Czech public. His work was largely unappreciated by the art world and perceived to be disrupting the genre norms of the time. His work was rediscovered in 1998 in a retrospective exhibit at the National Gallery Prague.

== Art exhibitions ==
Following his death, Schikaneder's work was first exhibited in 1926 in a collection of The Union of Fine Artists. In 1977, a second exhibition created by Jiří Kotalík and Dagmar Šefčíková showcased Schikaneder's pieces. Schikaneder's work has also been displayed in the National Gallery of Prague, Trade Fair Palace. Several auctions have also exhibited Schikaneder's pieces, with a record price of US$580,110 for his Winter in Prague, sold at Sotheby's London in 2021.

== Selected works ==
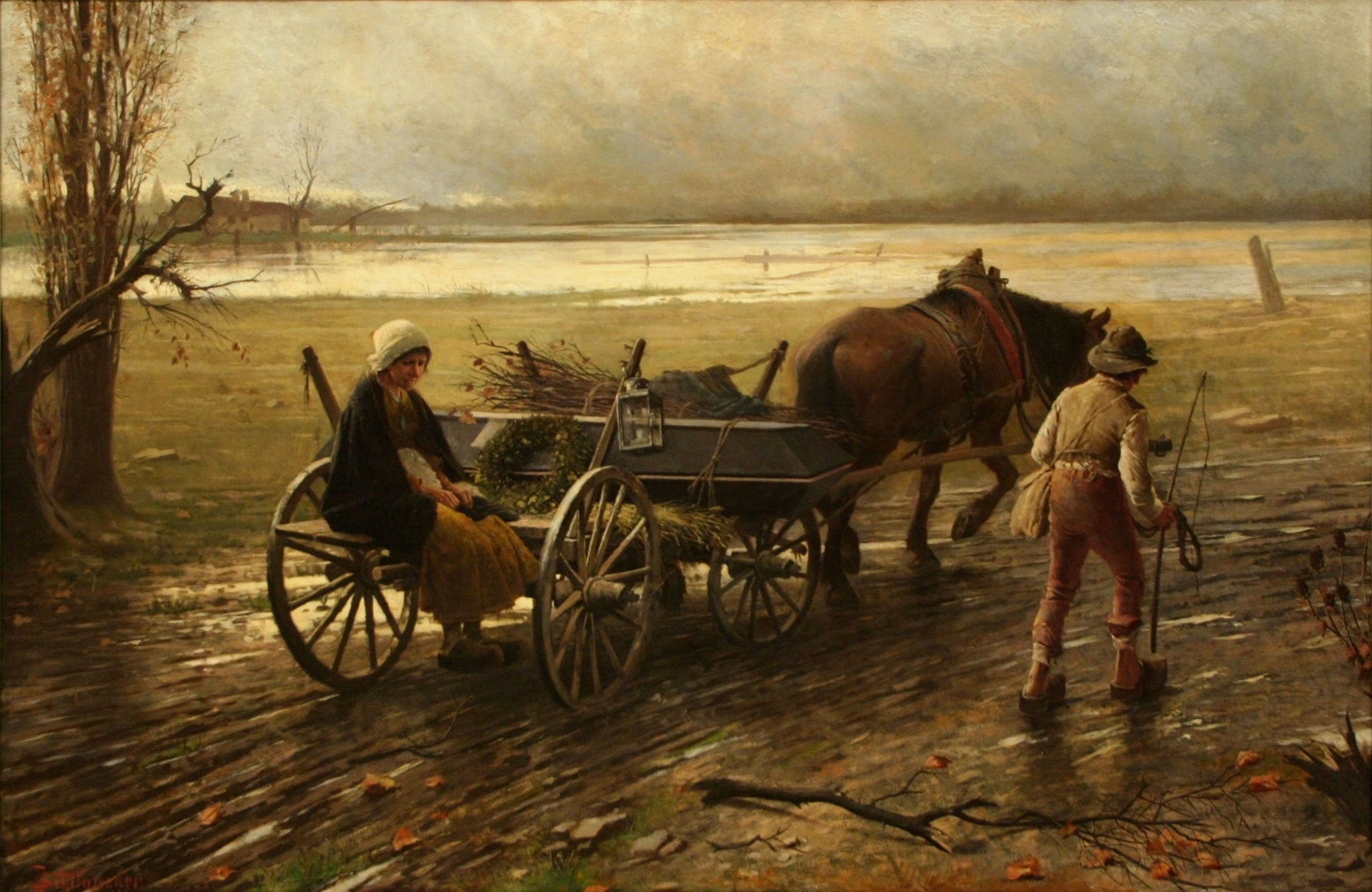
The Sad Way, 1886/87

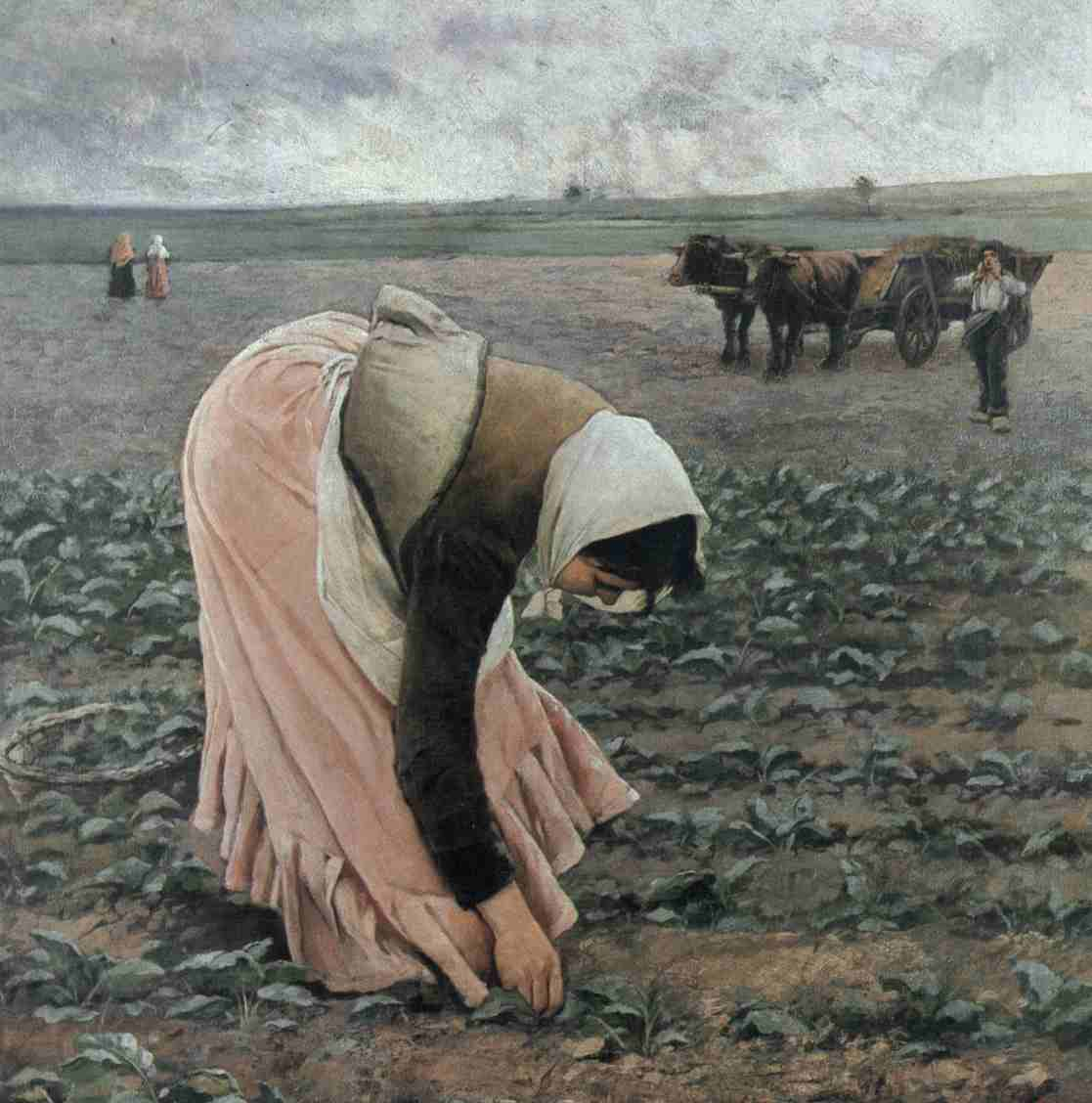
Weeder, 1887

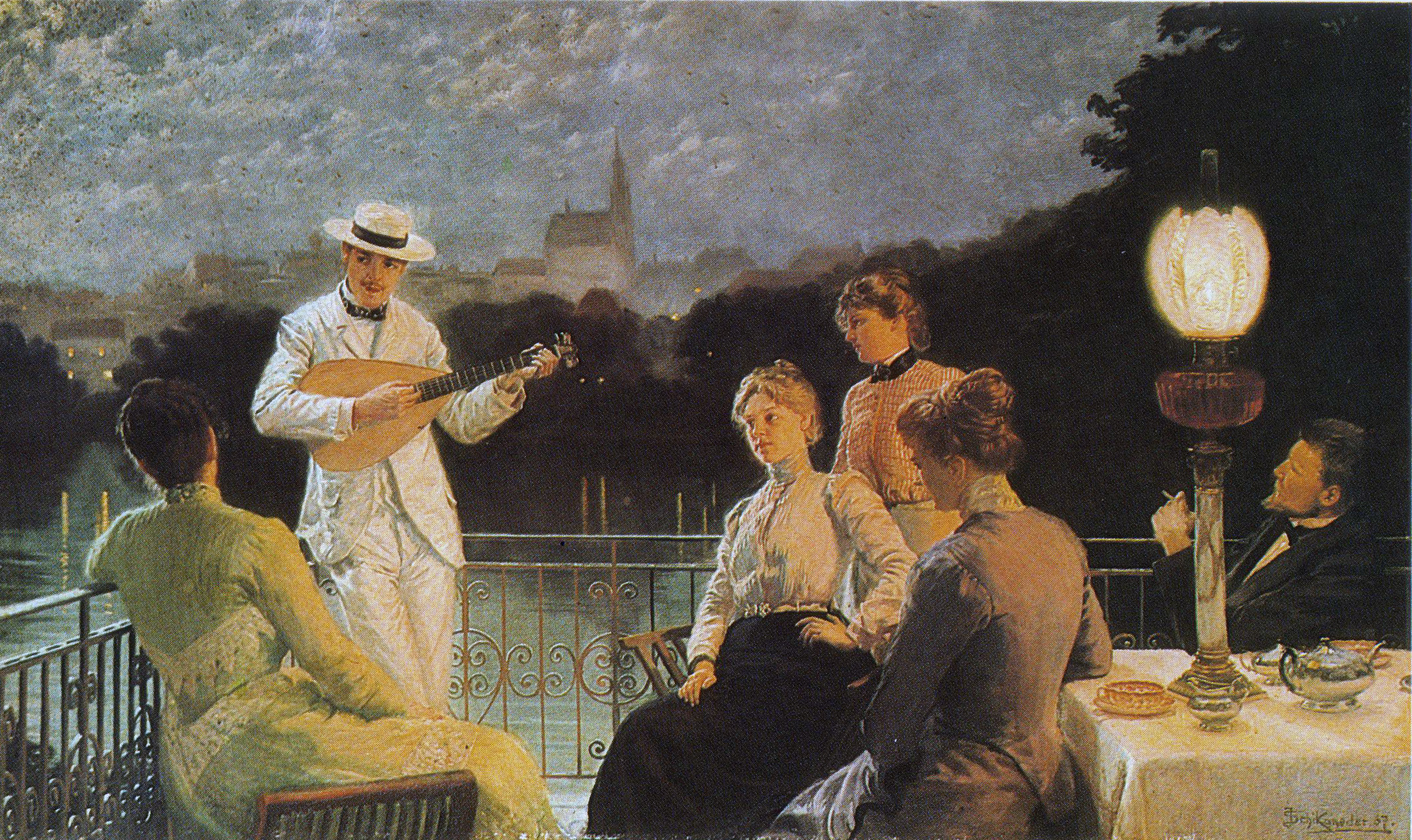
Company on the Terrace, 1887

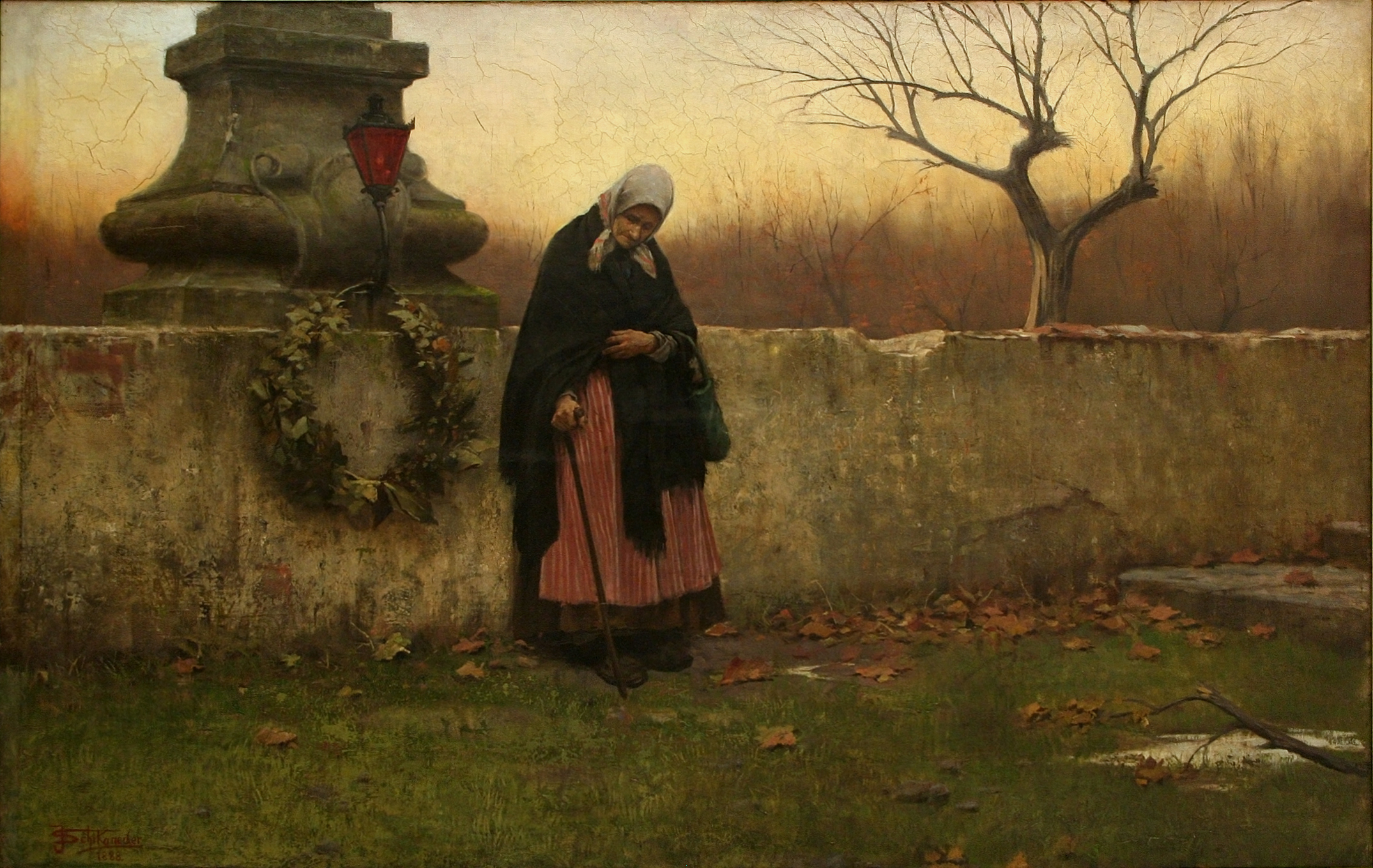
All Soul's Day, 1888

Murder in the House, 1890

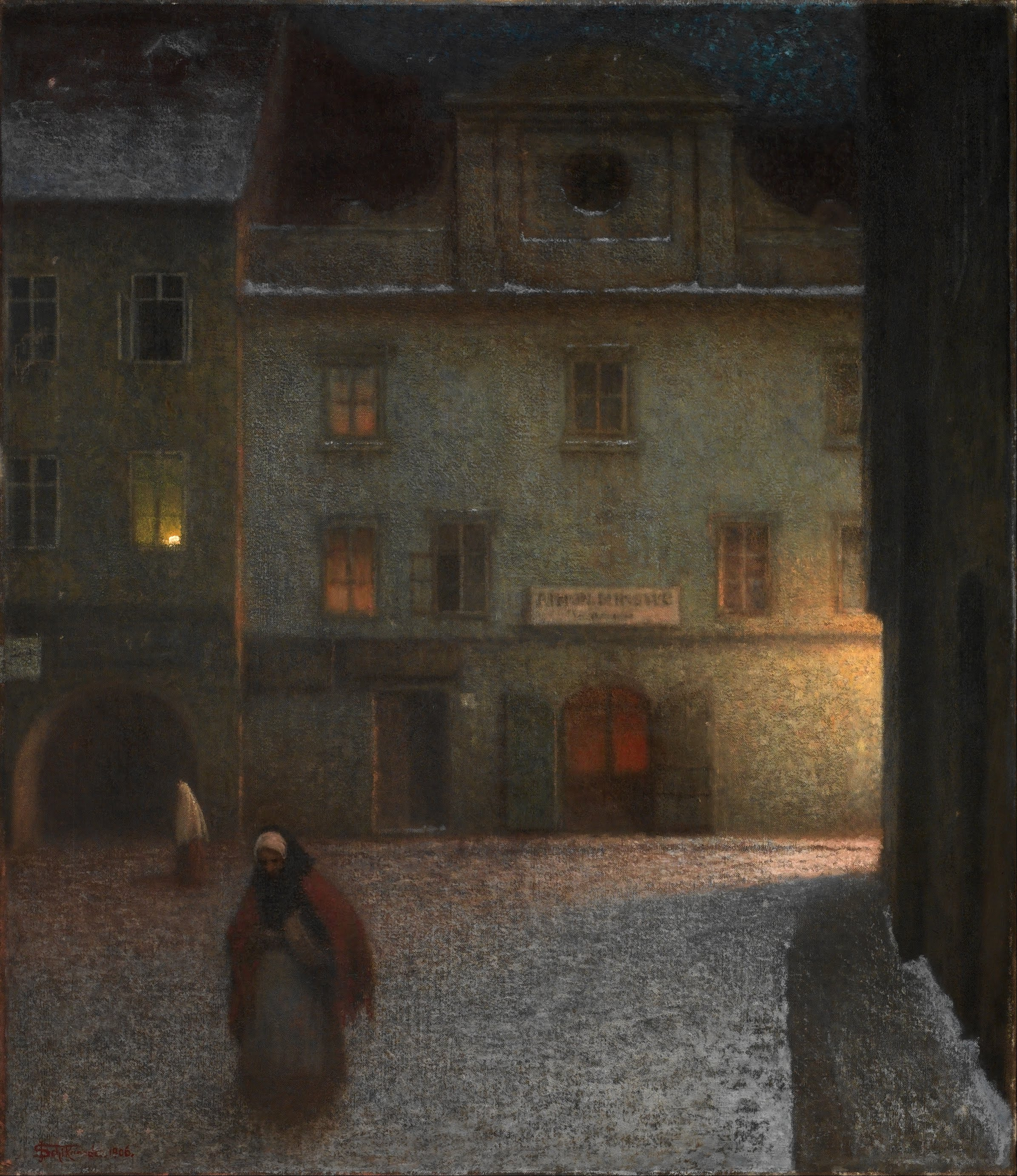
Evening Street, 1906

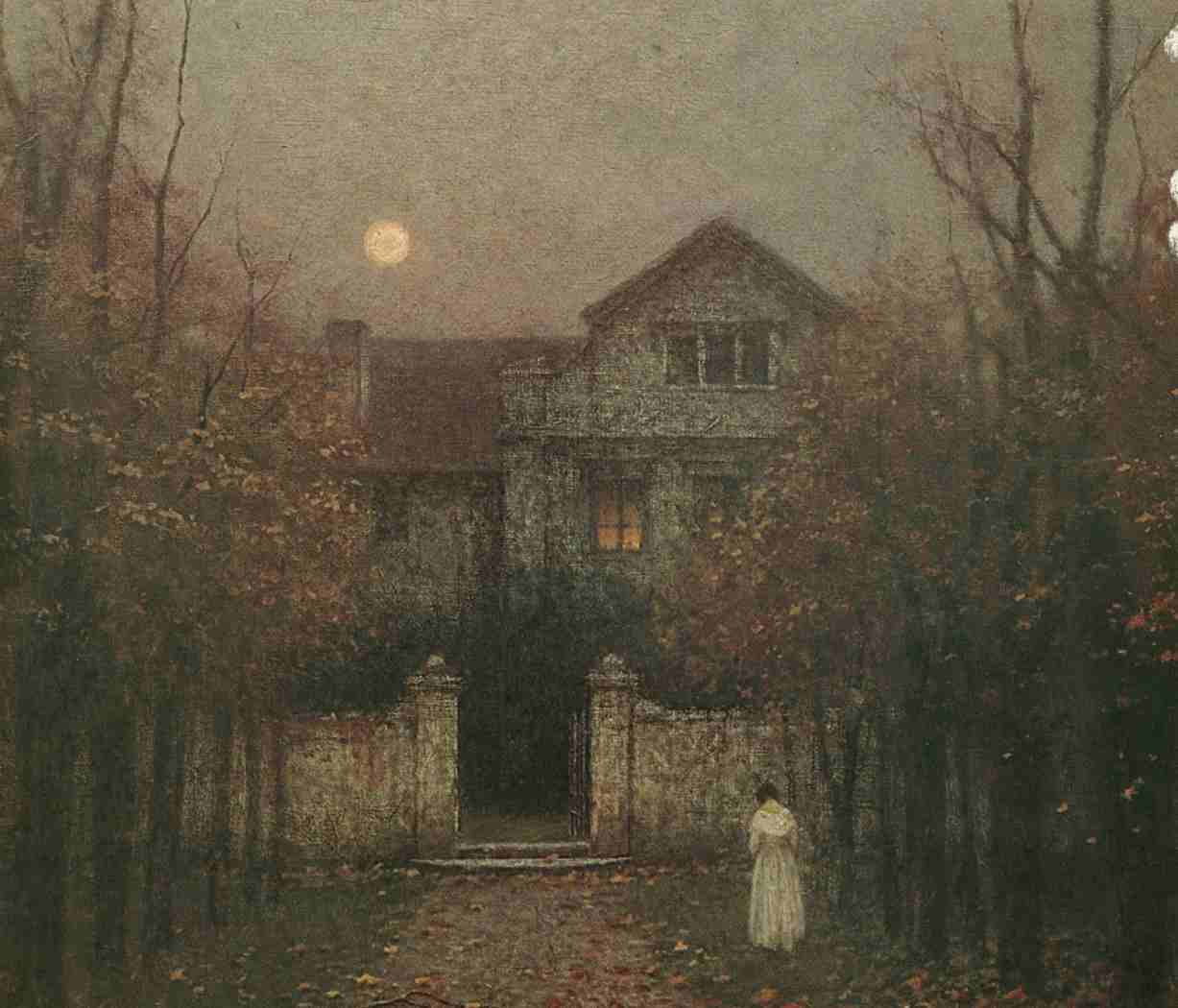
Evening in the Garden, 1907–1909

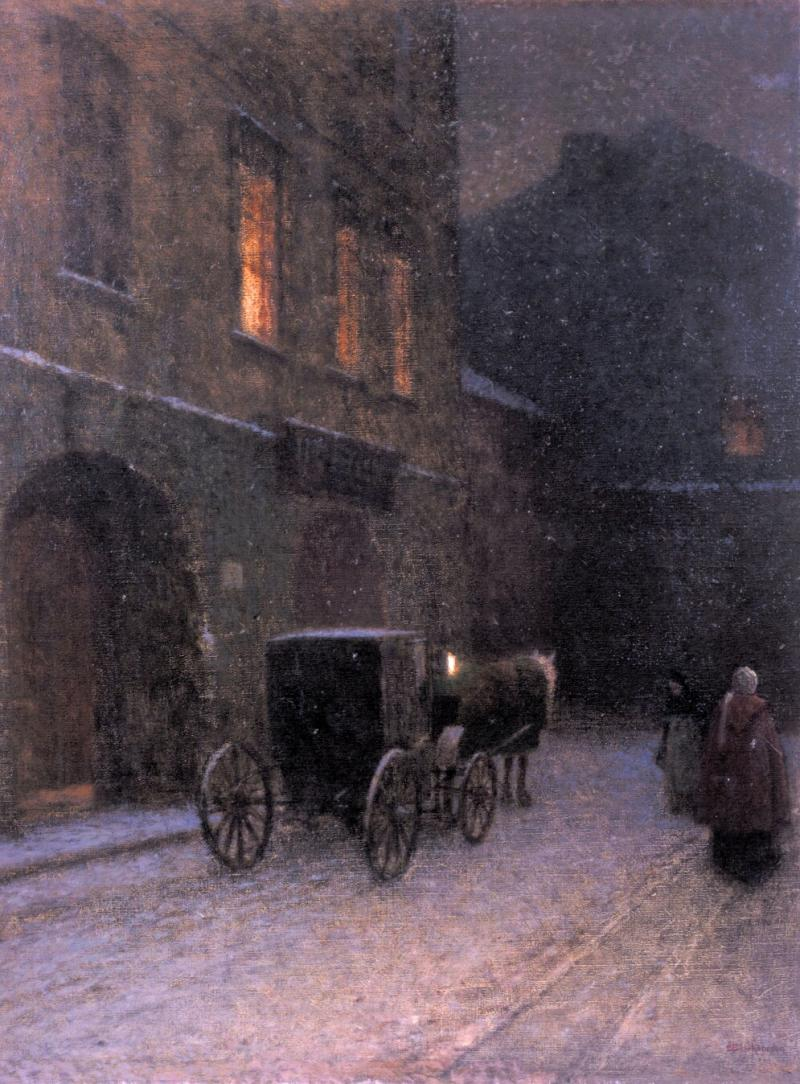
A Corner of Old Prague, 1900–1905

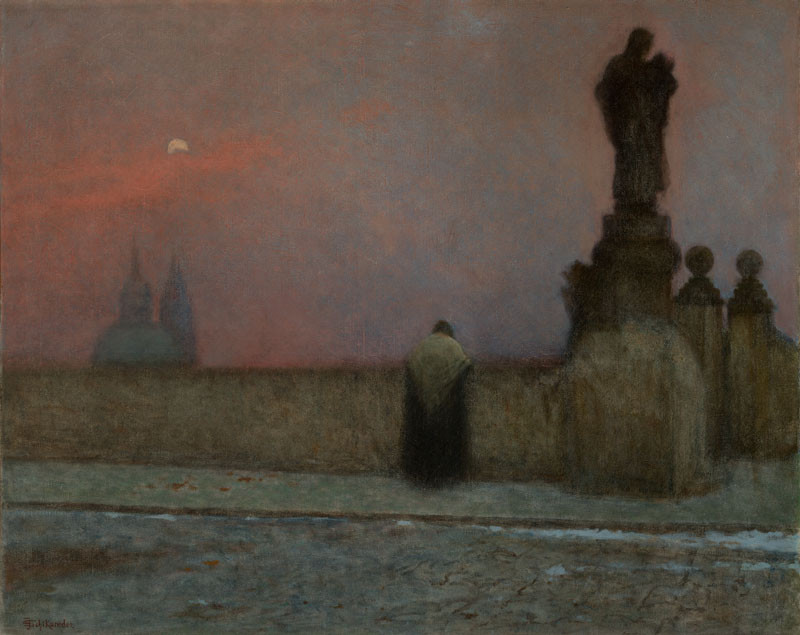
Early Evening at Hradčany, 1909–1913
