= Marie Pujmanová =

Marie Pujmanová

Marie Pujmanová (née Hennerová; 8 June 1893, Prague – 19 May 1958, Prague) was a Czech poet and novelist.

She was a founding figure in Czechoslovak Socialist realism and has been referred to as a "tough-minded Stalinist". That said, one of her own later works had to be rewritten to be more firmly in line with the Party.
